= Demographics of Kiribati =

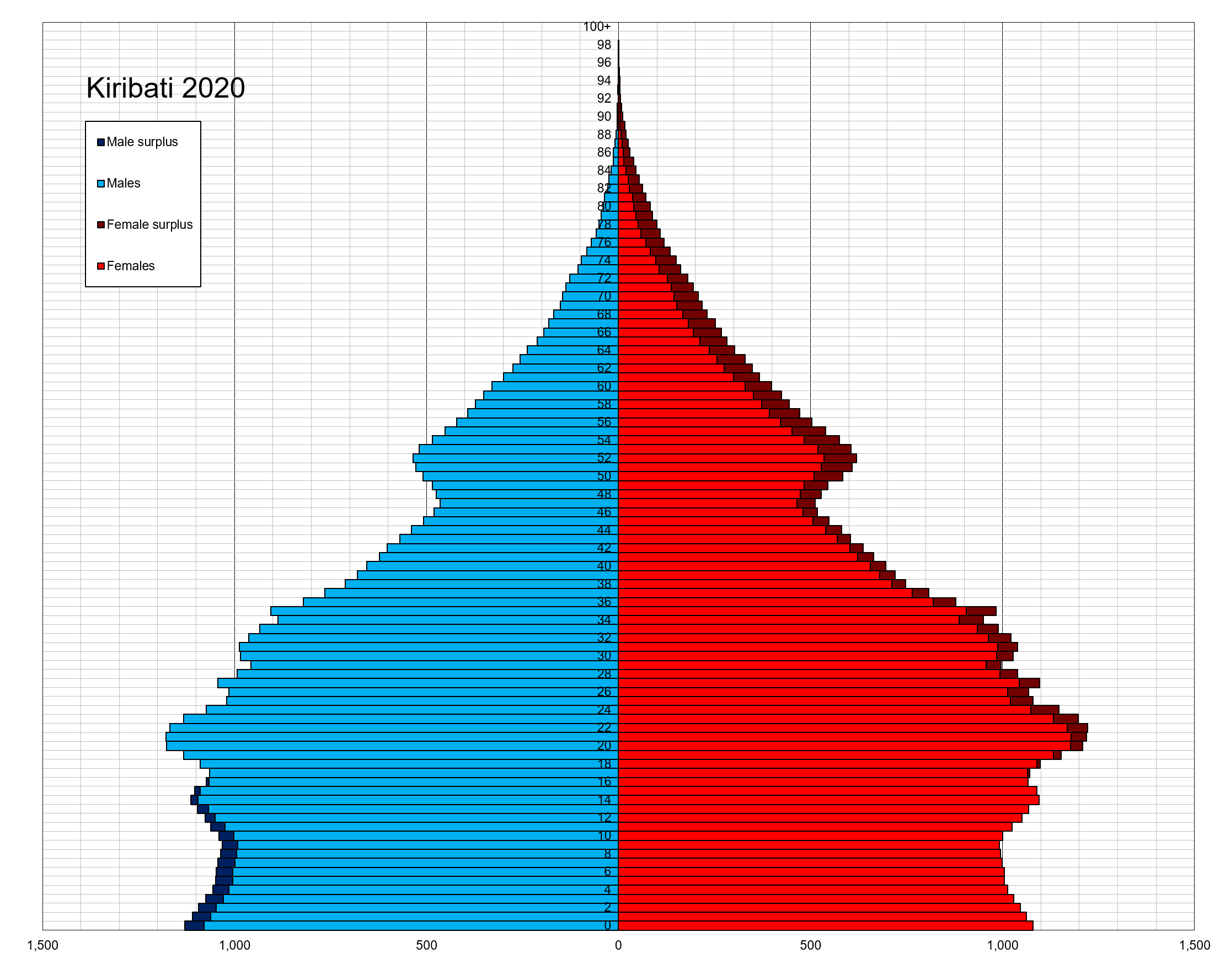
- Kiribati population pyramid in 2020
- Population: 128,874 (2021)

Demographic features of the population of Kiribati include population density, ethnicity, education level, health of the populace, economic status, religious affiliations, and other metrics.

== Population ==
- 110,136 (2015 census)
- 119,940 (2020 census)

Historical population

Year	Pop.	±%
1921	26,430	—
1931	29,751	+12.6%
1947	31,513	+5.9%
1963	43,336	+37.5%
1973	51,926	+19.8%
1978	56,213	+8.3%
1985	63,883	+13.6%

Year	Pop.	±%
1990	72,335	+13.2%
1995	77,658	+7.4%
2000	84,494	+8.8%
2005	92,533	+9.5%
2010	103,058	+11.4%
2015	110,136	+6.9%
2020	119,940	+8.9%

Largest villages in Kiribati 2020 Kiribati census
Rank	Name	Island	Pop.
1	Betio	South Tarawa	18,565
2	Bikenibeu	South Tarawa	7,547
3	Teaoraereke	South Tarawa	6,073
4	Bairiki	South Tarawa	3,500
5	Temwaiku	South Tarawa	5,504
6	Eita	South Tarawa	3,921
7	Tabwakea	Kiritimati	3,537
8	Bonriki	South Tarawa	3,075
9	Ambo	South Tarawa	3,373
10	London	Kiritimati	1,970

=== Population structure ===
Population by sex and age group (census 07.XI.2015):

Age group	Male	Female	Total	%
Total	54 096	56 040	110 136	100
0–4	7 546	6 847	14 393	13.07
5–9	6 903	6 697	13 600	12.35
10–14	5 309	5 136	10 445	9.48
15–19	5 851	5 825	11 676	10.60
20–24	5 199	5 120	10 319	9.37
25–29	4 682	4 990	9 672	8.78
30–34	3 838	4 174	8 012	7.27
35–39	3 161	3 423	6 584	5.98
40–44	2 433	2 658	5 091	4.62
45–49	2 676	3 031	5 707	5.18
50–54	2 372	2 533	4 905	4.45
55–59	1 548	1 773	3 321	3.02
60–64	1 051	1 355	2 406	2.18
65–69	731	1 017	1 748	1.59
70–74	460	778	1 238	1.12
75–79	217	391	608	0.55
80–84	80	187	267	0.24
85–89	30	79	109	0.10
90–94	7	17	24	0.02
95–99	2	9	11	0.01
100+	0	0	0	0
Age group	Male	Female	Total	Percent
0–14	19 758	18 680	38 438	34.90
15–64	32 811	34 882	67 693	61.46
65+	1 527	2 478	4 005	3.64

Population by sex and age group (census 07.XI.2020) (provisional):

Age group	Male	Female	Total	%
Total	59 154	60 786	119 940	100
0–4	7 965	7 422	15 387	12.83
5–9	7 517	6 895	14 412	12.02
10–14	6 701	6 598	13 299	11.09
15–19	5 368	5 022	10 390	8.66
20–24	5 629	5 520	11 149	9.30
25–29	4 993	5 113	10 106	8.43
30–34	4 511	4 776	9 287	7.74
35–39	3 791	4 086	7 877	6.57
40–44	2 997	3 145	6 142	5.12
45–49	2 311	2 555	4 866	4.06
50–54	2 413	2 802	5 215	4.35
55–59	1 861	2 289	4 150	3.46
60–64	1 386	1 679	3 065	2.56
65+	1 711	2 884	4 595	3.83
Age group	Male	Female	Total	Percent
0–14	22 183	20 915	43 098	35.93
15–64	35 260	36 987	72 247	60.24
65+	1 711	2 884	4 595	3.83

== Vital statistics ==
Vital statistic registration is incomplete.

=== Total fertility rate ===
- 2.25 children born/woman (2020 est.)
- 3.3 (2018–19) – Pacific community

== Ethnic groups ==
- I-Kiribati 96.2%, 105,983
- Mixed/I-Kiribati 1.8% 1,974
- Tuvaluans 0.2% 198
- Others 1.8% 1,981 (2015 census)

== Languages ==
- English (official)
- Gilbertese (official)

== Religion ==
- Roman Catholic: 57.3%
- Kiribati Uniting Church: 31.3%
- Latter-day Saints: 5.3%
- Baháʼí: 2.1%
- Seventh-day Adventist: 1.9%
- Other: 2.1% (2015 est.)
