= Education in Kiribati =

Secondary school students in Bikenibeu, Kiribati in 2007 photographed by Lorrie Graham.

Education in Kiribati is free and compulsory from age 6 to 14, which includes primary school through grade six, and Junior Secondary School for three additional grade levels. In 1998, the gross primary enrollment rate was 84.4 percent, and net primary enrollment rate was 70.7 percent. School quality and access to education are better in urban areas; schools in small communities on isolated islands are expensive to maintain. Mission schools are slowly being absorbed into the government primary school system.

The Human Rights Measurement Initiative (HRMI) finds that Kiribati is fulfilling only 90.6% of what it should be fulfilling for the right to education based on the country's level of income. HRMI breaks down the right to education by looking at the rights to both primary education and secondary education. While taking into consideration Kiribati's income level, the nation is achieving 94.4% of what should be possible based on its resources (income) for primary education but only 86.8% for secondary education.

== Primary and secondary education ==
There are primary schools on most of the inhabited islands. Secondary schools are located on some of the islands with students travelling to live at their school. For example, Abaiang, which is in the northern Gilbert Islands, has three secondary schools, in 2011 there were 212 students at the Ministry of Education school, Ueen Abaiang, which is located between the villages of Koinawa and Aonobuaka. A further 135 students are enrolled at St Joseph's College in Tabwiroa and 23 students at Steven Whitmee High School in Morikao, making 370 secondary school students in total. The two high schools at Morikao and Tabuiroa accommodate students from all over Kiribati who have passed the entrance examinations to get into the schools.

St. Joseph's College was founded in 1939 (87 years ago). Its alumni include former presidents Anote Tong and Teburoro Tito.

There are primary schools and secondary schools operated by the Christian denominations including the Roman Catholic Church (such as St. Joseph's College) and the Church of Jesus Christ of Latter-day Saints, (such as Moroni High School in South Tarawa, of which Waitea Abiuta has been the headmaster).

King George V and Elaine Bernacchi School, the Government High School, is in Bikenibeu in South Tarawa.

== Higher education ==
The Kiribati Teacher College is in Bikenibeu in South Tarawa.

Higher education is expanding; students may seek technical, teacher or marine training, or study in other countries. To date, most choosing to do the latter have gone to Fiji to attend University of the South Pacific, and those wishing to complete medical training have been sent to Cuba.

The University of the South Pacific has a campus in Kiribati for distant/flexible learning, but also to provide preparatory studies towards obtaining certificates, diplomas and degrees at other campus sites.

== Schools ==
Kiribati Ministry of Education is the education ministry. Kiribati has 94 elementary schools, 24 junior high schools, and 16 senior high schools. The government high schools are King George V and Elaine Bernacchi School, Tabiteuea North Senior Secondary School, and Melaengi Tabai Secondary School; Tabiteuea North, in Eita, is also known as Teabike College. Previously KGV/EBS was the sole government high school.

13 high schools are operated by Christian churches. They are:

- Abaiang
  - St Joseph's College
  - Stephen Whitmee High School
- Abemama
  - Chevalier School
  - Kauma High School - Also has junior high school
- Beru
  - Hiram Bingham High School
- Kiritimati
  - St. Francis High School
- Nonouti
  - George Eastman High School
- North Tarawa
  - Immaculate Heart College
- South Tarawa
  - Church of God High School
  - Moroni High School - Also has junior high school
  - Sacred Heart High School
  - St. Louis High School
  - William Goward Memorial School
