= Baháʼí Faith in Kiribati =

The Baháʼí Faith in Kiribati begins after 1916 with a mention by ʻAbdu'l-Bahá, then head of the religion, that Baháʼís should take the religion to the Gilbert Islands which form part of modern Kiribati. The first Baháʼís pioneered to the island of Abaiang (aka Charlotte Island, of the Gilbert Islands), on March 4, 1954. They encountered serious opposition from some Catholics on the islands and were eventually deported and the first convert banished to his home island. However, in one year there was a community of more than 200 Baháʼís and a Baháʼí Local Spiritual Assembly. Three years later the island where the first convert was sent to was found to now have 10 Baháʼís. By 1963 there were 14 assemblies. As the Ellice Islands gained independence as Tuvalu and the Gilbert Islands and others formed Kiribati, the communities of Baháʼís also reformed into separate institutions of National Spiritual Assemblies in 1981. The Baháʼís had established a number of schools by 1963 and there are still such today - indeed the Ootan Marawa Baháʼí Vocational Institute being the only teacher training institution for pre-school teachers in Kiribati. All together the Baháʼís now claim more than 10,000 local people have joined the religion over the last 50 years and there are 38 local spiritual assemblies.

== Early days ==
=== ʻAbdu'l-Bahá's Tablets of the Divine Plan ===
From 1892 to 1977 the islands of Kiribati were known as part of the British Empire and included the Gilbert Islands. ʻAbdu'l-Bahá, head of the religion from 1892 to 1921, mentioned the Gilbert Islands among the places Baháʼís should take the religion to. ʻAbdu'l-Bahá wrote a series of letters, or tablets, to the followers of the religion in the United States in 1916-1917; these letters were compiled together in the book titled Tablets of the Divine Plan. The seventh of the tablets mentioned taking the Baháʼí Faith to the Gilbert Islands and was written on April 11, 1916, but was delayed in being presented in the United States until 1919 — after the end of World War I and the Spanish flu. These tablets were translated and presented by Mirza Ahmad Sohrab on April 4, 1919, and published in Star of the West magazine on December 12, 1919.

(Tablet 7) "A party speaking their languages, severed, holy, sanctified and filled with the love of God, must turn their faces to and travel through the three great island groups of the Pacific Ocean—Polynesia, Micronesia and Melanesia, and the islands attached to these groups, such as New Guinea, Borneo, Java, Sumatra, Philippine Islands, Solomon Islands, Fiji Islands, New Hebrides, Loyalty Islands, New Caledonia, Bismarck Archipelago, Ceram, Celebes, Friendly Islands, Samoa Islands, Society Islands, Caroline Islands, Low Archipelago, Marquesas, Hawaiian Islands, Gilbert Islands, Moluccas, Marshall Islands, Timor and the other islands. With hearts overflowing with the love of God, with tongues commemorating the mention of God, with eyes turned to the Kingdom of God, they must deliver the glad tidings of the manifestation of the Lord of Hosts to all the people. Know ye of a certainty that whatever gathering ye enter, the waves of the Holy Spirit are surging over it, and the heavenly grace of the Blessed Beauty encompasseth that gathering."

=== Beginnings ===
The first Baháʼís to Kiribati were Elena Marsella and Roy Fernie, who left their home in Panama and positions on the National Spiritual Assembly of Panama to pioneer. They arrived on the island of Abaiang (aka Charlotte Island, of the Gilbert Islands), on March 4, 1954. For this service they were named Knights of Baha'u'llah by then head of the religion, Shoghi Effendi. About the first of June 1954, former Roman Catholic seminarian and mission teacher Peter Kanere Koru quickly became the first convert on the island. He attributed his conversion in part to his attraction to the racial equality practiced by the pioneers, and their desire to implement such equality in his society.

==== Incidents related to the first native Baháʼí ====
When Koru became the first Baháʼí Shoghi Effendi urged him in a letter of welcome to be "very discreet in spreading this Message", explaining that the Baháʼís did not wish to become a "source of discord, or arouse opposition". However several issues came to the fore to animate hostility from the local Catholics. First, Roy was an amateur magician. Roy was a confident figure who held a show along with a piano the first night they arrived. Records show that within weeks he attracted Sunday audiences perhaps dropping attendance at Sunday services. In the judgement of researcher Graham Hassall, Roy was most likely unaware of the fact that sorcery and magic were practiced widely in Gilbertese culture, and were being actively suppressed by the Catholics ministers and now here was a new presence in the community giving shows including magic tricks. Indeed, there are reports the Catholic minister's actions against the Baháʼís helped spread knowledge of them. Then there was the attempt of the Fernies to set up an English language school - and the fund-raising activities they organised in Tuarabu conflicted with the Tuarabu Catholics attempt to raise funds for their own purposes and embarrassingly unable to match donations with another nearby Catholic community. Indeed, a quarter ton of text books were sent from the Baháʼís of Panama to support the imminent school which was to be open to all natives irrespective of their religion. Lastly the conversion of a seminarian and missionary teacher away from Catholicism - these are all issues mostly likely to lead to antagonism from the Catholics. Indeed, the Catholic mission worked to have the Fernies deported, and on several occasions used its journal to "warn" its members against examining this new religion. Central to their initial complaint to authorities, however, was that missionary activity required 100 or 200 individuals to sanction a group of religionists to allow for missionary work. However over two hundred Abaiang residents registered their wish to become Baháʼís after showing up at the home of the Fernies at 3am, and some 90 people came the next day to see Koru whom Catholic opposition had forced into banishment to his home island of Tabiteuea later in June. His pregnant wife who went into labour had to be left behind in a hospital and she died a short time later. On 24 September 1955 the government gave legal recognition to the first Baháʼí institution in the islands, the village of Tuarabu's Baháʼí Local Spiritual Assembly on the island of Abaiang. Regardless, Roy Fernie was deported in November 1955 with the support of local land owners. Through correspondence Koru and Elena Marsella were working on translations of a collection of the Baháʼí prayers, Hidden Words, and excerpts from the writings of ʻAbdu'l-Bahá until later in 1956 when Marsella left. Before she left the Education Department had approved Elena and two native Baháʼís as teachers in the new school. The new Baháʼí community which had formed essentially in one year continued to function and for a time Shoghi Effendi requested no further pioneers go to the Gilbert Islands. Koru did not meet Baháʼís again until four years later, but he remained steadfast in his beliefs. By the time Baháʼís were eventually able to come to visit him, nine more people were active members of the religion on his island, (apparently nearly fifty had been drawn to the religion there.) One of them was a Protestant minister then under disciplinary sanction by his church.

==== Continued early growth of the religion ====
In 1956 four assemblies (including Tuarabu, Tebero, and Kuria) were elected and five smaller groups of Baháʼís. In addition to Koru, other early converts included Taukoriri Eritai, who became a Baháʼí at the time the Fernies were on Abainag, and Timeon Tamaroa who helped take the religion to the island of Beru. In earliest 1957 Shoghi Effendi allowed pioneers to consider the Gilbert Islands and Frances Heller from the United States was able to arrive on February 8, 1957. She was able to remain despite failing health until June 1958 - having helped elect the spiritual assembly of Betio. American Mabel Adelle Sneider was the next to arrive and she and Heller agreed the religion needed to be taken to the capital of the islands. So it was that Sneider established herself in the village of Bikenibeu on Tarawa in October 1958. Sneider lived there for 15 years helping to transfer the center of Baháʼí activities from the relatively remote island of Abaiang to the civic capital on Tarawa - eventually Snieder was elected to the National Spiritual Assembly often serving as secretary or treasurer at one time or another. She helped purchase the site for the National Haziratu'l-Quds, or the seat, of the National Assembly. Pioneers Joe Russell (arrived in May 1959, and became a Kiritbati citizen) and John Thurston soon followed. Meanwhile, the school started by the Fernies was noted as still in existence in 1958 despite their absence. By 1959 a new building, on donated land and built by Baháʼís alone, had managed to be built for the school while temporary housing for visitors and Baháʼí centers were being raised. By November 1959 two summer schools were held and a conference to discuss the progress of the religion on the islands. Russell was able to travel to Tabiteuea to join Koru in December 1959 and together they helped establish three assemblies by April 1960. By 1961 there were thirteen communities with Baháʼís.

== Growth across the country ==
With a few pioneers and many local converts the community in the South Pacific was organized into a regional national spiritual assembly for the South Pacific Islands which was elected from 1957 to 1967 including Cook Island, Fiji, New Caledonia, Samoa and other islands. The delegates from the Gilbert and Ellice Islands were unable to attend the 1959 election. By 1961 the religion had reached the Ocean Island (now called Banaba Island) and one of the delegates from the Gilbert Islands was able to attend the convention to elect the regional national spiritual assembly for the South Pacific Islands.

=== Status in 1963 ===
By the end of 1963 there were a wide range of communities across the Gilbert Islands with 14 assemblies, 19 groups, and 7 additional isolated Baháʼís.

Assemblies
1. Aobike 2. Betio, Tarawa 3. Bikenibeu, Tarawa 4. Bubuti 5. Buota, North Tabiteuea 6. Eita, North Tabiteuea 7. Kuria, Abaiang
8. Makin 9. Taku, South Tabiteuea 10. Tekaman 11. Terikiai, North Tabiteuea 12. Tewai, South Tabiteuea 13.Tuarabu, Abaiang 14. Utiroa, North Tabiteuea
Groups
1. Bairiki, Tarawa 2. Bangai, Tabiteuea 3. Beru Island 4. Borotiam, Abaiang 5. Buariki, Tabiteuea
6. Buariki, Tarawa 6. Eita, Tarawa 7. Ereti, Tarawa 8. Koinawa, Abaiang 9. Maiana Island 10. Nuatabu, Tarawa
11. Nuotaea, Abaiang 12. Ocean Island 13. Taburoa, Abaiang 14. Tanaeang, Tabiteuea 15. Tauma, Tabiteuea
16. Taungeaka, Tabiteuea 17. Tebero, Abaiang 18. Tekabwibwi, Tabiteuea 19. Tekaman, Tabiteuea
Isolated Baháʼís
1. Abemama Island 2. Butaritari Island 3. Marakei Island 4. Onotoa Island 5. Tanimaiaki, Abaiang 6.Tenatorua, Tabiteuea 7. Ubanteman Village, Abaiang

The Baháʼís established a number of schools by 1963 - Tuarabu Primary School, Abaiang Island, and several on Tabiteuea Island - Eita, Utiroa, Taku and Tababuea Primary Schools.

=== Forming a national community ===
Yale University professor Charles Forman analyzed religious trends across the Pacific Islands and attributes the surprising growth of the Baháʼí Faith across Micronesia was partly due to a certain amount of response from some youths of wider experience and education as well as from some village folk among whom Baháʼís settled In October 1966 Hand of the Cause Collis Featherstone attended the dedication of the main Baháʼí center of the islands inaugurated with a conference discussing the progress of the religion on the island.

With the assistance of the Hands of the Cause Collis Featherstone and Rahmatu'lláh Muhájir the Baháʼí communities in the area reorganized to form a regional National Spiritual Assembly of the Baháʼís of the Gilbert and Ellice Islands in 1967. In 1970 the national assembly held three classes on methods Baháʼís use for growth of the religion and began holding them in a building, the Baháʼí Institute, owned by the assembly. In May 1971 an international conference on the progress of the religion across the south pacific as held in Suva, Fiji to which Gilbert Island Baháʼís went. Following that conference a national conference for the Gilbert Islands was held at the Baháʼí Institute. As of 1972 the statistics of the national assembly counted 2700 members across Gilbert and Ellice Islands with 51 Assemblies. In February 1973 the national assembly produced two five-minute radio programs for an observance of Human Rights Day that was broadcast on radio in two languages, Gilbertese and Ellice. The program was on the equality of men and women, with passages from the Writings of ʻAbdu'l-Bahá and a report on the advancement of women in the islands. In April 1973 twenty-three delegates from nine islands gathered in the National Teaching Institute and the Baháʼí Maneba, a native meeting hall with no sides and a high thatched roof, for the national convention. Together the Institute and the Maneaba are part of the national headquarters Pao Penox. For United Nations Day the national assembly distributed background materials on the observance to national Director of Information, thee King George IV boarding school, the island Teachers College, and to the Department of Education. In 1976 Hand of the Cause Collis Featherstone made a return trip the islands of the region. While in Kiribati he addressed a reception held in his honor and attended by the governor, deputy governor, and government ministers and secretaries. A copy of The Baháʼí' World, vol. XIV, was presented to the governor for the House of Assembly library and a 20-minute radio interview with Mr. and Mrs. Featherstone was broadcast over Radio Tarawa. In 1978 the Baháʼís took various roles about societal issues. First in several events across the islands they participated in and helped organize the occasions commemorating Japanese soldiers who died in the islands in World War II. Second they helped during a cholera outbreak in September - the Baha'is relayed messages using the radio equipment on the Baháʼí-owned catamaran Erena-Roe which also ferried patients to the hospital and a Baháʼí served as secretary of the government's response committee created to manage the epidemic. The Erena-Roe was making a last run before the owner left the islands and came across a girl in the ocean who was returned to her native island alive though feared dead. By 1979 the national assembly reported there were 80 local assemblies - 16 of which were officially registered with the government and 13 of which had their own centers.

As the Ellice Islands gained independence as Tuvalu and the Gilbert Islands and others formed Kiribati, the communities of Baháʼís also reformed into separate institutions of National Spiritual Assemblies in 1981.

=== Multiplying interests and activities of the community ===
Following the growth of the institutions the sociological impact of the Baháʼís became more well known starting in the 1980s. It became known that the Baháʼís of Kiribati used traditional Maneba buildings to meet in. Thanks to Peter King, a New Zealand Baháʼí pioneer on Tarawa, a center was raised on Christmas Island in 1981. By 1982 there were 50 local assemblies across Kiribati. Henry Brechtefeld was born in Kiribati but moved to the Solomon Islands where he came in contact with the Garcias, converted, and then moved on the islands of Micronesia, including back to Kiribati, and was well known to have reformed his behavior among his family on Kiribati and friends. He died in 1982 back on the Solomon Islands. In 1984, Art New Zealand profiled Robin White as a Kiribati artist who had moved from metropolitan New Zealand of Dunedin to life on the tropical island. In 1985 the Baháʼís held their first national youth conference in Bikenibeu. By 1986 there is a Baháʼí on the Pacific Christmas Island which is closer to Honolulu than to the capital on Tarawa, 2000 miles to the west.

== Modern community ==
=== Focus to the society ===
Since its inception the religion has had involvement in socio-economic development beginning by giving greater freedom to women, promulgating the promotion of female education as a priority concern, and that involvement was given practical expression by creating schools, agricultural coops, and clinics. The religion entered a new phase of activity when a message of the Universal House of Justice dated 20 October 1983 was released. Baháʼís were urged to seek out ways, compatible with the Baháʼí teachings, in which they could become involved in the social and economic development of the communities in which they lived. Worldwide in 1979 there were 129 officially recognized Baháʼí socio-economic development projects. By 1987, the number of officially recognized development projects had increased to 1482. The Baháʼís of Kiribati have engaged a wide variety of social and economic development projects. The Ootan Marawa Baháʼí Vocational Institute, a high school, is the only teacher training institution for pre-school teachers in Kiribati. It is open to all, regardless of religion, and is assisted by the National Spiritual Assemblies of the Baháʼís of Australia and New Zealand. There are five pre-schools administered by Baháʼí local spiritual assemblies on Tarawa and the outer islands. They accept pupils of all religious affiliations. After coming to a reception at the national convention and noting the importance of religious unity and liberty in Kiribati, the contributions to Kiribati society were noted by then president, Ieremia Tabai, and ministers of government in speeches when they then attended a 1986 peace conference at which over 1000 Baháʼís attended. The successes of the schools in Kiribati were discussed at the 100th Anniversary of the Baháʼí Faith in Hawaii at breakout workshops in 2001 which included participants from many countries. The Kiribati government supported the United Nations General Assembly vote on the "Situation of Human Rights in the Islamic Republic of Iran" (A/56/583/Add.3 Draft Resolution) on 19 December 2001.

=== Internal developments ===
Internal the community among the developments are the following. In 1990 the national convention elected two indigenous women, Maureen Nakekea and Marao Teem, to the national assembly. At the 50th anniversary, 2004, celebrations of the Baháʼí Faith in Kiribati dignitaries attending included President Anote Tong and Madam Tong, Mr. Michael Fudakowski, representing the National Spiritual Assembly of the Baháʼís of New Zealand and who lived for some 17 years in Kiribati with his wife, Robin White, now a member of the Continental Board of Counsellors in Australasia, and their family. Mr. Dominic Tabuaka represented the National Spiritual Assembly of the Baháʼís of the Marshall Islands, and congratulatory messages arrived from Baháʼís in Australia, Canada, Hawaii, the Solomon Islands, Ukraine, the United States, and Western Caroline Islands.

=== Demographics ===
There has long been a discrepancy between census figures and assertions by the Baháʼí community on their population in Kiribati. The census figures are consistently between 2 and 3% while the Baháʼís claim numbers above 17% as far back as 1987. Baháʼís now claim more than 10,000 local people have joined the religion over the last 50 years and there are 38 local spiritual assemblies.

== See also ==
- History of Kiribati
- Religion in Kiribati
