= Nanikai =

Nanikai Nanikaai village
- Village
- Nanikai Village
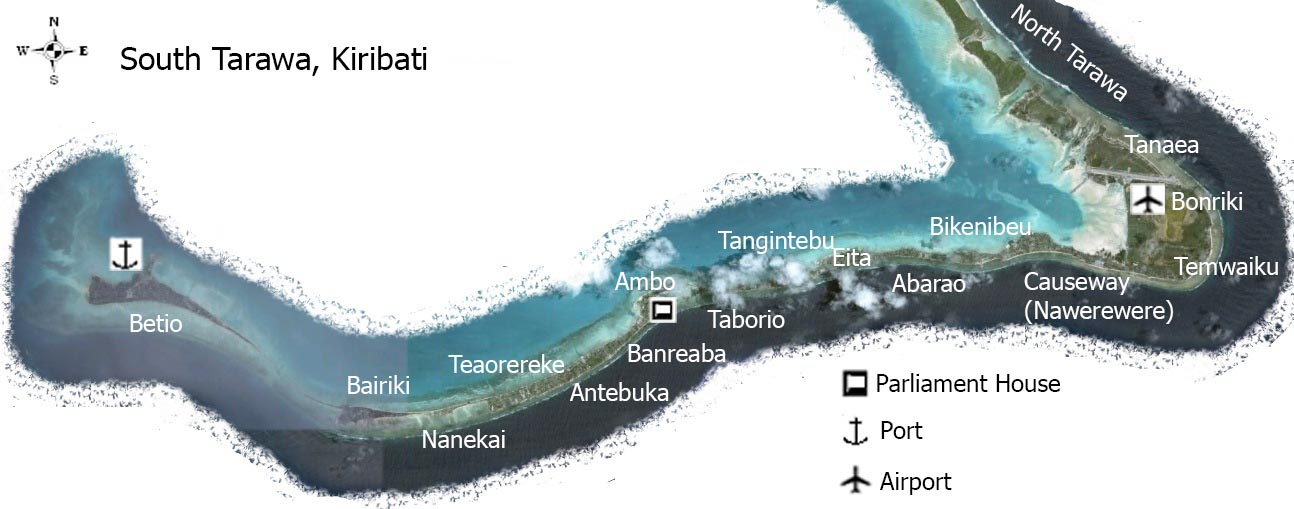
- Map of South Tarawa, Kiribati

- Map showing Nanikai in Kiribati
- Country: Kiribati
- Island group: Gilbert Islands
- Atoll: Tarawa

Population
  - Total: 1,256

Nanikai, also known as Nanikaai or Nanekai, is a village in South Tarawa, Kiribati. The small village connects the town of Bairiki to the settlement of Teaoraereke. There is one road that passes through the village. The population of Nanikai as of 2020 was 1256.
