= Tourism in Kiribati =

Tourism in Kiribati is still developing and is becoming increasingly important for the country. Due to its location, Kiribati is one of the least visited countries in the world, recording just 5,663 international visitors in 2017. Kiribati is an island country located in the central Pacific Ocean and consists of 33 islands, of which 21 are inhabited. Tourism is not the largest sector of Kiribati's economy which is largely reliant on exports of copra and coconuts.

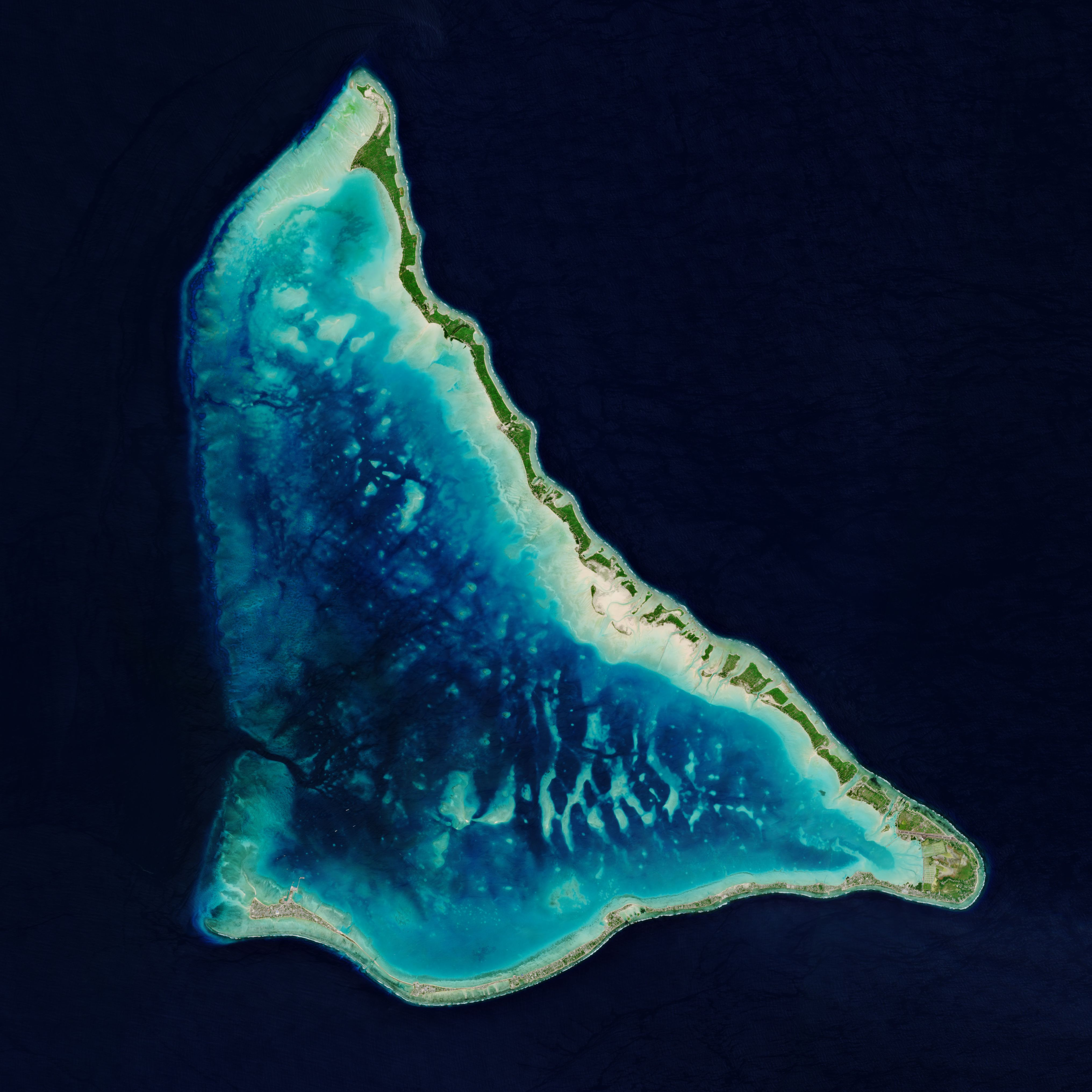
Tarawa Atoll

== Overview ==
Kiribati is a small archipelagic state in the Pacific Ocean, with a population of 121,300. According to the United Nations, Kiribati is a least developed country. As a result, tourism infrastructure is still relatively undeveloped.

Kiribati has made attempts to attract cruise ship passengers, though most international visitors arrive by air. Bonriki International Airport, located in the capital, South Tarawa, serves as the main international airport for visitors. The flag carrier Air Kiribati also operates flights from Bonriki International Airport to other atolls. In addition, Kiritimati is served by Cassidy International Airport. There are only two airlines operating international flights to Kiribati: Fiji Airways and Nauru Airlines. In 2019, Kiribati received 7,917 international visitors by air, of which 70% arrived in Tarawa and 30% in Kiritimati. Most visitors arriving in Tarawa, however, were for business purposes. The main source of visitors in Kiribati are other Pacific Island nations and the United States.

Due to its small size, tourism attractions are rather limited. Kiritimati primarily attracts tourists interested in fishing, as it is known for being a bonefish fishery. The Phoenix Islands Protected Area is an UNESCO World Heritage Site and is known for its coral reefs. Much of the tourist activities in Kiribati revolve around the water and its beaches, such as snorkelling, birdwatching, and diving. There are also World War II remnants located in Betio that tourists can explore.

== Saltwater fly fishing in Christmas Island (Kiritimati) ==
Christmas Island (Kiritimati), part of the Republic of Kiribati, is widely recognized as a world-class destination for saltwater fly fishing. Its extensive, shallow hard-sand flats, clear lagoon waters, and consistent year-round conditions provide ideal habitat for species such as bonefish and giant trevally.

The remoteness and low fishing pressure allow anglers to enjoy immersive flats-fishing experiences and pursue both moderate-sized and trophy saltwater species.

Improved accessibility through renewed tourism infrastructure has strengthened Kiritimati's reputation as one of the premier destinations for saltwater fly-fishing in the Pacific.

== Tourist attractions ==
- Phoenix Islands Protected Area an UNESCO World Heritage Site
- Parliament House in South Tarawa
- Phosphate mining in Banaba
- Kiribati Cultural Museum
- Bairiki National Stadium
- Sites remain from Battle of Tarawa in World War 2
- Christmas Island

== Visa Policy ==
Visa policy of Kiribati Kiribati Visa not required (1 month) Visa required

All persons travelling to Kiribati are required to hold a valid visa unless they come from one of the designated visa exempt countries and territories.
