= King George V School (Gilbert and Ellice Islands) =

Coordinates: 1°20′N 173°00′E

King George V School (KGV) was a government high school for boys in the Gilbert Islands (present-day Kiribati) within the Gilbert and Ellice Islands, a British colony. Throughout its history, it was in multiple locations such as South Tarawa and Abemama. It served as a boarding school, and trained people to be government workers and teachers.

John Garrett, author of Where Nets Were Cast: Christianity in Oceania Since World War II, wrote that many of its alumni "shaped a nucleus which assisted" the independence of what became Kiribati.

== History ==
It was originally located in Bairiki, South Tarawa, where it opened in 1922. For much of its history its headmaster was a New Zealander, F. G. L. Holland. At some point it moved to Abemama.

It moved to Bikenibeu, South Tarawa in 1953. From 1953 until 1975 students from the Ellice Islands (present-day Tuvalu) could sit the selection tests for admission to the King George V School and the Elaine Bernacchi Secondary School. In 1974, the Ellice Islanders voted for separate British dependency status as Tuvalu, which ended the colony of the Gilbert and Ellice Islands. The following year the Tuvaluan students were transferred to Motufoua Secondary School on Vaitupu.

In 1965, KGV merged with the girls' school Elaine Bernacchi School (EBS) to form the coeducational King George V and Elaine Bernacchi School.

== Enrollment ==
It had 150 students in 1955.

== Notable staff ==
- Taomati Iuta - teacher, later a Speaker of the House of Assembly and Vice-President of Kiribati.
- Filoimea Telito - student, later the Governor-General of Tuvalu and president of the Church of Tuvalu.
