= Temwaiku =

Coordinates: 1°21′50″N 173°09′42″E

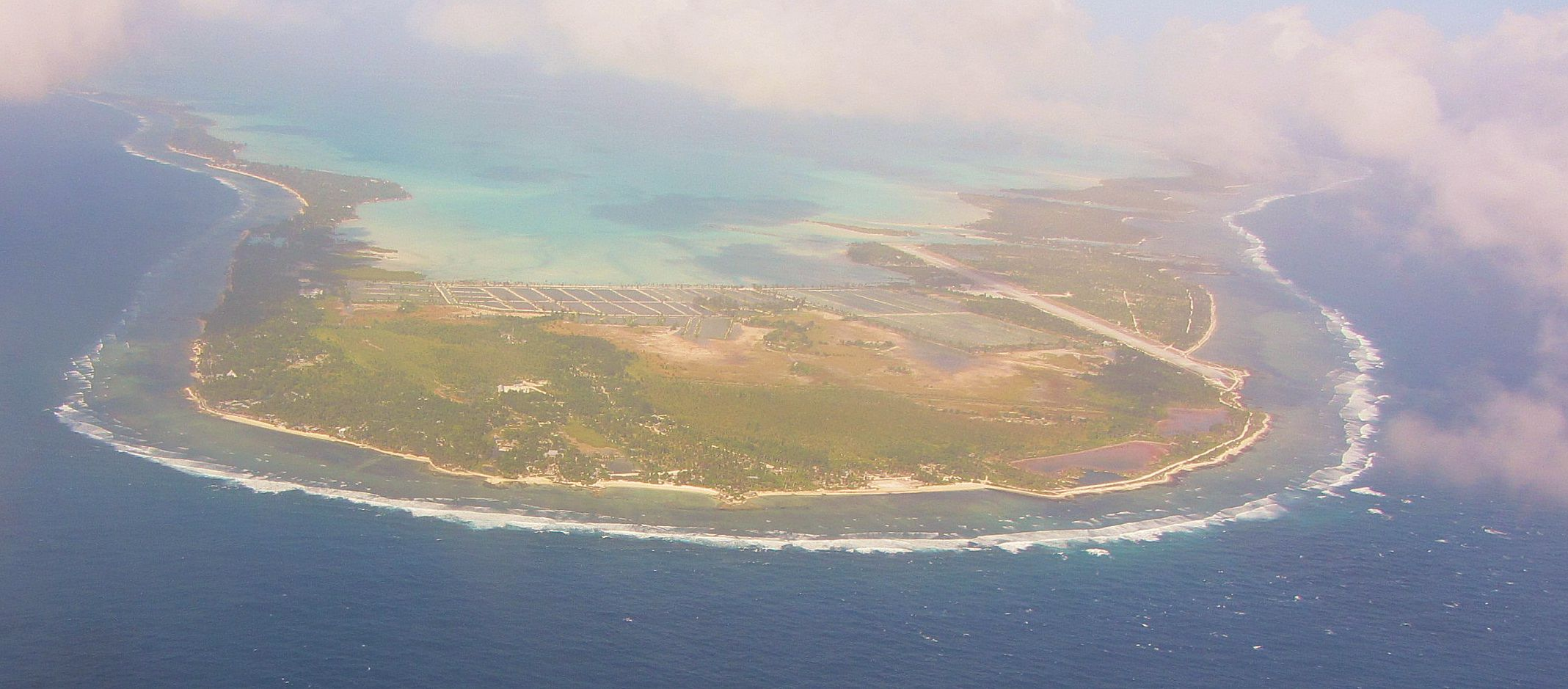
Temwaiku and Bonriki Airport, view from east side

Temwaiku is a town and settlement in South Tarawa in Kiribati. It is part of a nearly continuous chain of settlements along the islands of South Tarawa, which are linked by causeways, in the same islet of Bonriki.

Temwaiku had 4,072 inhabitants at the 2015 census, making it the fourth most populated area in Kiribati]and the third in South Tarawa Teinanano Urban Council (TUC), after Bikenibeu and Teaoraereke.
