= HBHS =

HBHS may refer to one of several high schools:

== Australia ==
- Homebush Boys High School, in Homebush, Sydney

== Kiribati ==
- Hiram Bingham High School, in Rongorongo, Beru Island

== New Zealand ==
- Hamilton Boys' High School, in Hamilton
- Hastings Boys' High School, in Hastings

== United Kingdom ==
- Haydon Bridge High School, in Haydon Bridge, Northumberland, England

== United States ==
- Helen Bernstein High School, in Los Angeles, California
- High Bridge High School, in High Bridge, New Jersey (see High Bridge School District)
- Hollis/Brookline High School, in Hollis, New Hampshire
- Hudson's Bay High School, in Vancouver, Washington
- Huntington Beach High School, in Huntington Beach, California
