= King George V and Elaine Bernacchi School =

Coordinates: 1°20′N 173°00′E

King George V and Elaine Bernacchi School (KGV/EBS) is a government senior high school of Kiribati, located in Bikenibeu, South Tarawa. As of 1993 it had almost 600 students. In 1993 it had a competitive admissions process as there was not enough space for every high school student in Kiribati; the remainder had to enroll in Christian high schools. Since then the Kiribati government has established two additional government high schools.

The school is next to the Ministry of Education head office.

== History ==
It was formed by the 1965 merger of two schools: King George V School, a boys' secondary school that was founded in 1922 in Bairiki and later moved to Abemama, and then Bikenibeu in 1953, and the Elaine Bernacchi School, a girls' secondary school founded in 1959 in Bikenibeu. From 1953 until 1975 students from the Ellice Islands could sit the selection tests for admission to the King George V School and the Elaine Bernacchi Secondary School. In 1974, the Ellice Islanders voted for separate British dependency status as Tuvalu, which ended the Gilbert and Ellice Islands colony. The following year the Tuvaluan students were transferred to Motufoua Secondary School.

Previously teachers at KGV/EBS did curriculum development for all government schools in Kiribati, but in 1988 they began asking for compensation for their curriculum development. The Curriculum Development and Resources Centre (CDRC), formed in 1992, eventually assumed responsibility for that task.
