= Waitea Abiuta =

Kiribati religious leader

Waitea Abiuta was one of the first converts to the Church of Jesus Christ of Latter-day Saints (LDS Church) in Kiribati and was the first i-Kiribati leader in the LDS Church.

In 1972, Abiuta was the headmaster of a primary school in Tarawa. He wrote letters to secondary schools around the world asking if his students could attend for further education. The LDS Church's Liahona High School in Tonga received one of the letters and admitted 12 of Abiuta's students in 1973. While in Tonga, all 12 of these students joined the LDS Church and six became Mormon missionaries in 1975. While assigned to the Fiji Suva Mission of the church, the missionaries returned to Kiribati to preach Mormonism.

Abiuta was one of the first converts of the i-Kiribati missionaries. On 24 January 1976, Kenneth Palmer, the president of the Fiji Suva Mission, appointed Abiuta as the first branch president of the LDS Church in Kiribati. The LDS Church later purchased Abiuta's school and named it Moroni Community School; when it changed from a primary to a secondary school it was renamed Moroni High School.
