= Filoimea Telito =

Governor-General of Tuvalu from 2005 to 2010

His Excellency The Reverend Sir Filoimea Telito GCMG MBE
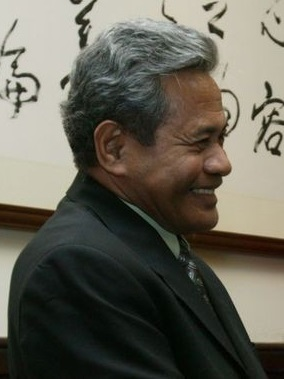
- Telito in 2006

8th Governor-General of Tuvalu
- In office 15 April 2005 – 19 March 2010
- Monarch: Elizabeth II
- Prime Minister: Maatia Toafa; Apisai Ielemia
- Preceded by: Faimalaga Luka
- Succeeded by: Kamuta Latasi (acting)

Personal details
- Born: 19 March 1945 Vaitupu, Gilbert and Ellice Islands (present-day Tuvalu)
- Died: 11 July 2011 (aged 66) Tuvalu
- Cause of death: Heart attack
- Resting place: Funafuti, Tuvalu
- Spouse: Pepapeti Telito

Sir Filoimea Telito GCMG MBE (19 March 1945 – 11 July 2011) was a Tuvaluan politician and religious figure who served as the governor-general of Tuvalu from 2005 to 2010, and also served as the president of the Church of Tuvalu until his death.

== Background ==
Born on the Vaitupu atoll on 19 March 1945, he attended Elisefou (New Ellice) primary school, and later attended King George V Secondary School in Tarawa, Kiribati.

He served as principal of the Motufoua Secondary School on Vaitupu, and was a pastor in the Church of Tuvalu (Ekalesia Klisiano Tuvalu), of which he eventually became the president, a position which he held until his death. In the 1997 New Year Honours, Telito was appointed a Member of the Order of the British Empire (MBE) for "community and public services, especially to education."

== Governor-General of Tuvalu ==
On 15 April 2005 he took office as Governor-General of Tuvalu as the representative of Elizabeth II, Queen of Tuvalu. He stepped down in 2010. In January 2007, Telito was made a Knight Grand Cross of Order of Saint Michael and Saint George (GCMG) by Queen Elizabeth II. Herewith he resumed the practice by Governors-General of Tuvalu of accepting a knighthood, a practice discontinued on a personal basis by his predecessor to that office, Faimalaga Luka.

== Death ==
He died on 11 July 2011 of a heart attack, and was buried in Funafuti three days later. All government activity ceased on the day of the funeral, in a sign of respect.

Government offices
Preceded by Faimalaga Luka	Governor General of Tuvalu; 2005–2010	Succeeded by Sir Kamuta Latasi; Acting
