= Ta'uma =

Town in northwestern Syria

Touma طعوما
- Village
- Tawma
- Location in Syria
- Coordinates: 35°42′33″N 36°10′55″E
- Country: Syria
- Governorate: Latakia
- District: al-Haffah
- Subdistrict: Kinsabba

Population (2004)
  - Total: 498
- Time zone: UTC+2 (EET)
  - Summer (DST): UTC+3 (EEST)

Ta'uma (طعوما) is a village in northwestern Syria administratively belonging to the al-Haffah District of the Latakia Governorate, located northeast of Latakia. According to the Syria Central Bureau of Statistics (CBS), Kinsabba had a population was 498 in 2004.

== See also ==
- Jabal al-Akrad
