= Teaoraereke =

Town in Kiribati

Coordinates: 1°20′03″N 173°00′50″E

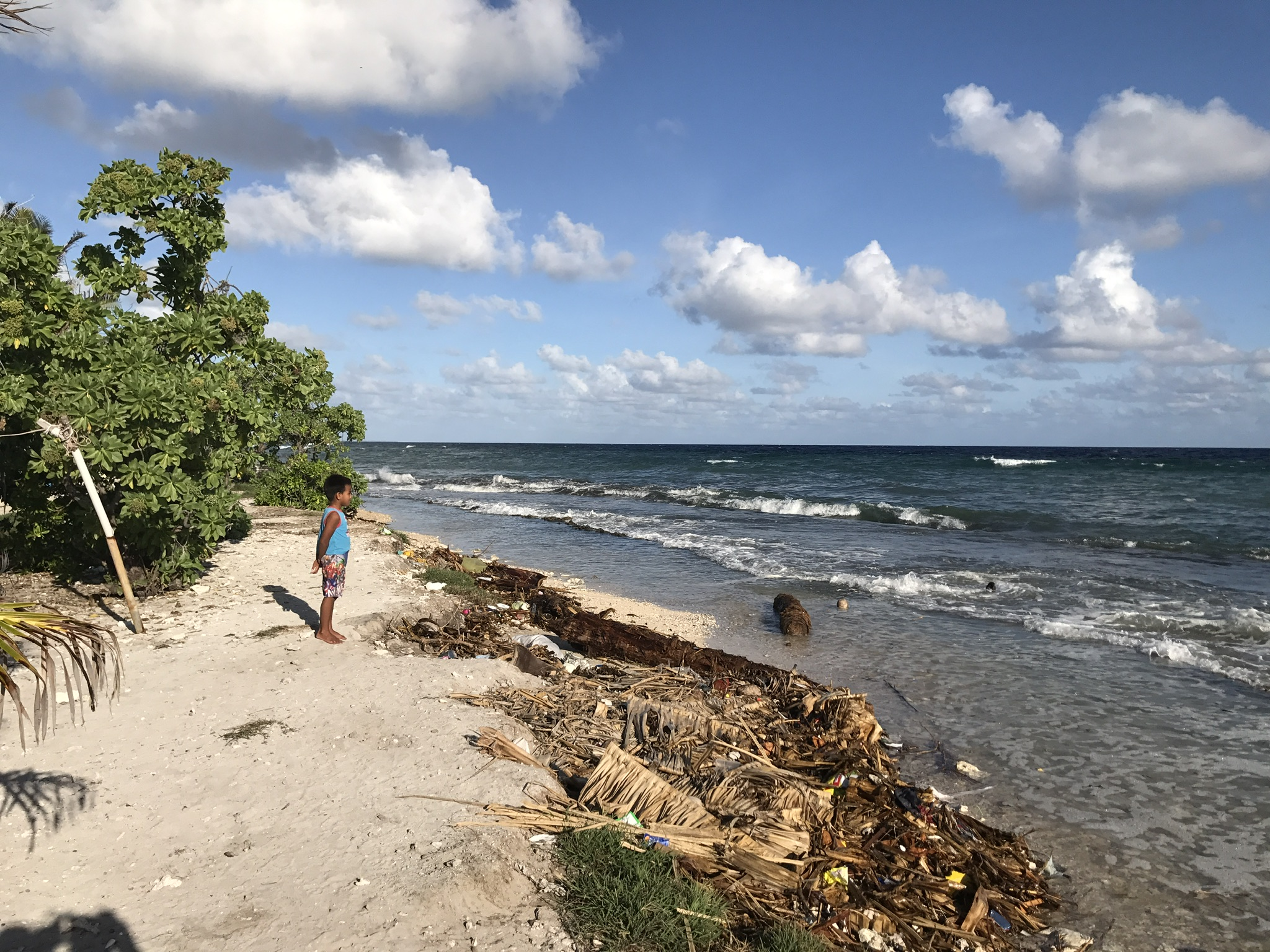
Seaside at Teaoraereke, South Tarawa, Kiribati

Teaoraereke (in Gilbertese, the narrow surface) is a town and settlement in South Tarawa of Kiribati.

It is part of a nearly continuous chain of settlements along the islands of South Tarawa, which are now linked by causeways, between Bairiki and Buota (North Tarawa). Teaoraereke lies between Nanikai and Antebuka.

6,073 inhabitants live in Teaoraereke at the last census (2020), that means the third populated area in all Kiribati and the second of South Tarawa’s Teinainano Urban Council (TUC), but Bikenibeu. There are the Kiribati campus of University of South Pacific and the TUC main office. The Episcopal see of the Catholic Church in Kiribati and the Diocese of Tarawa and Nauru, the Sacred Heart Cathedral are also in Teaoraereke.
