= Hiram Bingham High School =

Secondary school in Rongorongo, Beru Island, Kiribati

Coordinates: 1°19′S 175°58′E

Hiram Bingham High School (HBHS) is a secondary school in Rongorongo, Beru Island, Kiribati, serving forms 1-7. It is affiliated with the Kiribati Uniting Church (formerly the Kiribati Protestant Church or KPC). It has boarding facilities.

== History ==
Reverend William Goward created the school in 1900. It was previously operated by the London Missionary Society (LMS), and its original purpose was to train clergy for the KPS.

John Garrett, author of Where Nets Were Cast: Christianity in Oceania Since World War II, stated in its history that the school "struggled to align at least some of its standards with" that of King George V School, a government high school.

In 1993 it was the only full secondary school operated by the KPC. Between 2008 and 2011 the number of students declined.
