= Bonriki =

Coordinates: 1°22′20″N 173°09′09″E

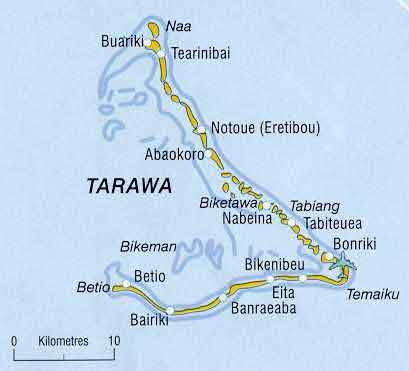
Map of the Tarawa atoll

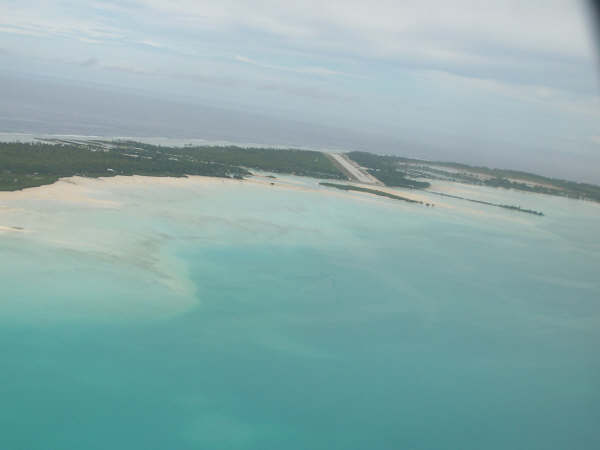
The Bonriki International Airport from air, one of two international airports in Kiribati

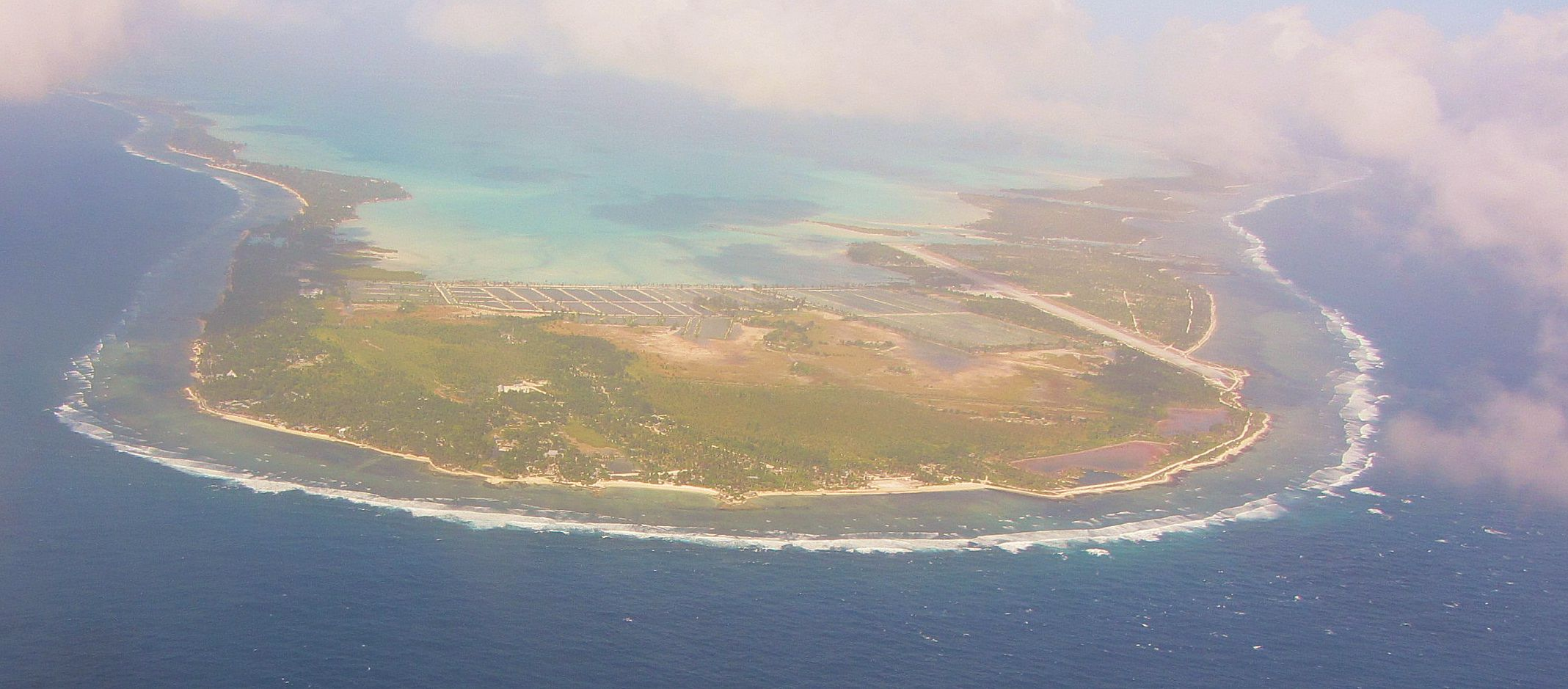
Tarawa and Airport Bonriki, view from east side

Bonriki is a settlement on Tarawa atoll, Kiribati, near Temwaiku and is part of the municipality of South Tarawa. It is in the south-east of South Tarawa. Bonriki International Airport, one of two international airports in Kiribati, is located here. One of the first roads linking islands together in Tarawa connects Bonriki to Bikenibeu.

== See also ==
- Air Kiribati
- Naval Base Tarawa
- List of towns and villages in Kiribati
