= Buota =

Islet and settlement on Tarawa, Kiribati

Coordinates: 1°36′00″N 173°00′00″W

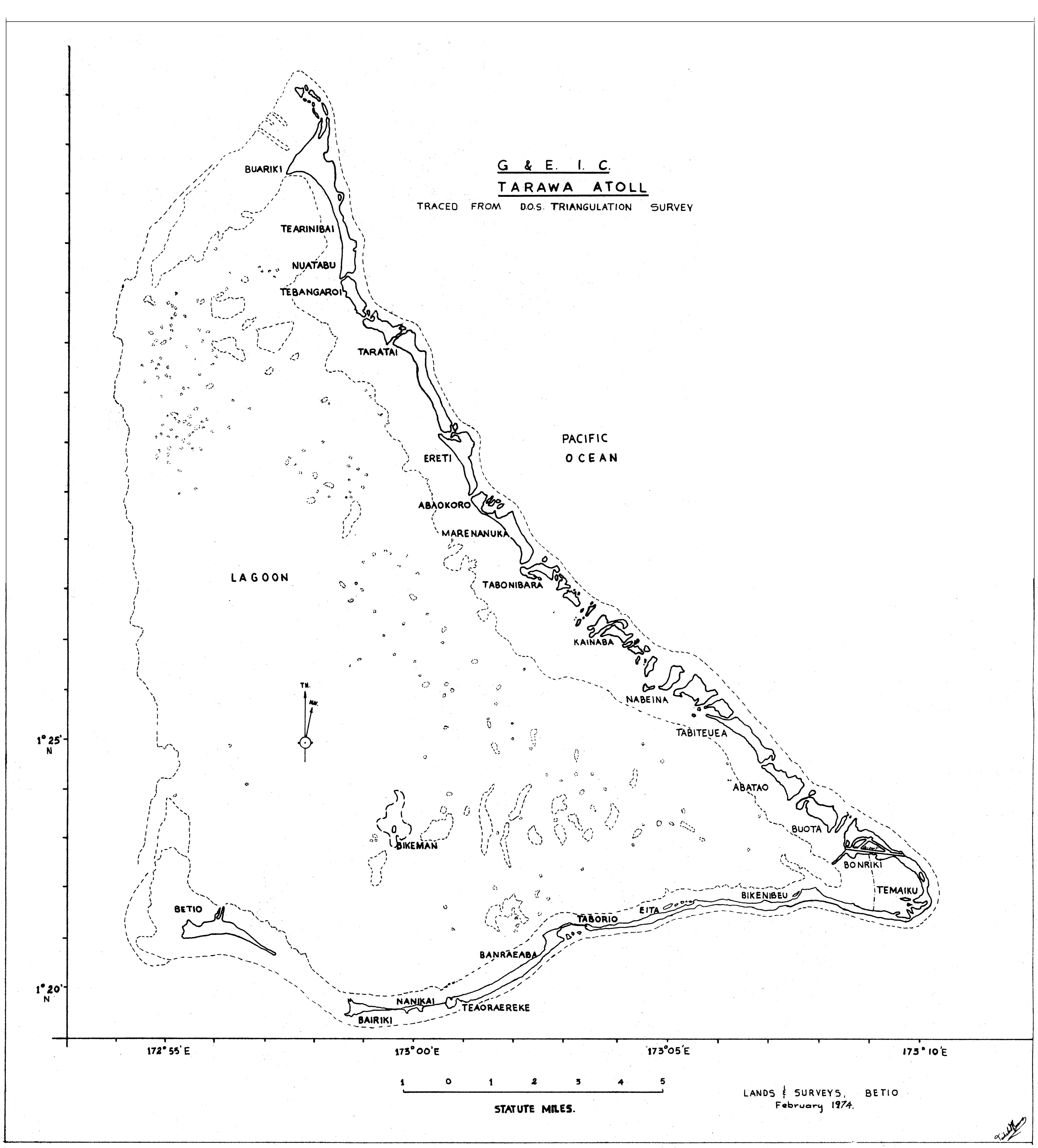
Map of the Tarawa atoll

Buota is an islet and a settlement on the island of Tarawa, Kiribati. There are 1,756 inhabitants (2015). The islet is the southernmost part of North Tarawa even if there is a bridge connecting it to Bonriki and South Tarawa.
