= Te Umanibong =

Museum in Kiribati

Coordinates: 1°21′59″N 173°07′17″E

- Te Umanibong
- Formation: 1973
- Founder: Tungavalu Society
- Type: Governmental
- Purpose: Cultural
- Key people: Pelea Tehumu
- Staff: 5 (2014)
- Website: https://internalaffairs.gov.ki/cmd/

Te Umanibong (also Te Umwanibong) or the Kiribati Cultural Museum, or Kiribati Museum and Cultural Centre, is a museum in Bikenibeu on the atoll of Tarawa in Kiribati. It displays artefacts and other items of cultural and historic significance.

== History ==
The beginnings of the foundation of Te Umanibong date to 1971, when the intention was set after a UNESCO meeting in Suva. This led to the foundation in 1973 of the Tungavalu Society, which was set up by islanders and people in the diaspora from the Gilbert and Ellice islands. The society ran a newsletter called Banan Tungavalu, which was distributed from September 1974. In 1975, the society held their first exhibition and a craft competition.

In 1977 a Cultural Unit was formed as part of the Ministry of Education, and it became responsible for the nascent growth of cultural heritage in Kiribati. The unit focussed and documented much of the country's intangible cultural heritage. In 1987, the Cultural Unit began to consider "the museum" as a separate section of its work, and, with the aid of two development workers from New Zealand, plans for a physical museum proceeded.

== Buildings and administration ==
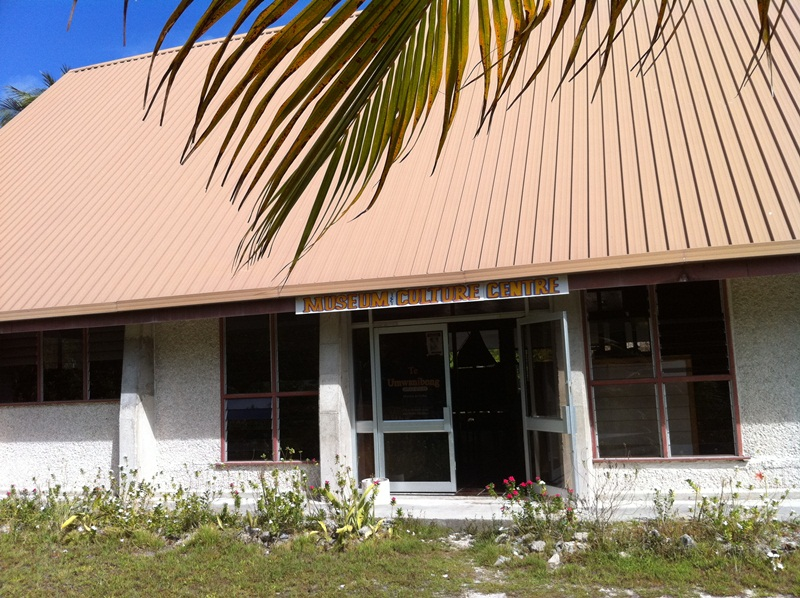
Kiribati Cultural Museum in Bikenibeu, Tarawa

In 1990 the government of New Zealand funded the construction of a museum building in Bikenibeu. In order for the museum to be built, a sea wall had to be constructed to drain and reclaim the land. The building opened in 1991 and raised the profile of the organisation both within the country and overseas. At the same time as the museum was being built, a mwaneaba was constructed in the grounds. There is also a botanic garden in the grounds, with a focus on medicinal plants.

As of 2014 the museum has five employees: Senior Cultural Officer, Cultural Officer, Assistant Cultural Officer, Web Advisor, and a Registry Clerk. From 2006 to 2014 the Senior Culture Officer was Tekautu Ioane. From 2014 the position has been held by Pelea Tehumu.

== Collections ==
During the 1970s the Tungavalu Society began to establish a museum collection, this was initially based on donations from I-Kiribati and foreign workers. It was also anticipated that requests for repatriation of objects held in museum collections elsewhere would be granted and would contribute to the collection. In 1979 an exhibition of Kiribati artefacts was organised as part of the celebrations of independence. A public appeal was made for objects relating to Kiribati's history, either for loan for the duration of the display or to form part of the national collection. In addition the governments of Fiji, Samoa and Tokelau sent objects relating to their cultures as gifts to mark Kiribati's independence, resulting in Kiribati having a Pacific cultures collection. In 1997 the museum purchased eel traps from Nonouti and by 1998 there were approximately 80 objects in the collection.

The museum displays focus on the material culture of Kiribati under themes which include: mwaneabas, pandanus basketry, dance costumes, fishing. There is also a small display of objects relating to Kiribati in the Second World War.

=== Overseas collections ===
In part due to legacies of colonial exploitation, many objects relating to Kiribati's cultural heritage are held in overseas collections, which include: the British Museum; National Museums Scotland; Glasgow Museums; Te Papa; Metropolitan Museum of Art; Peabody Museum; Pitt Rivers Museum; Otago Museum; Museum of Archaeology and Anthropology; Bowers Museum; amongst others.

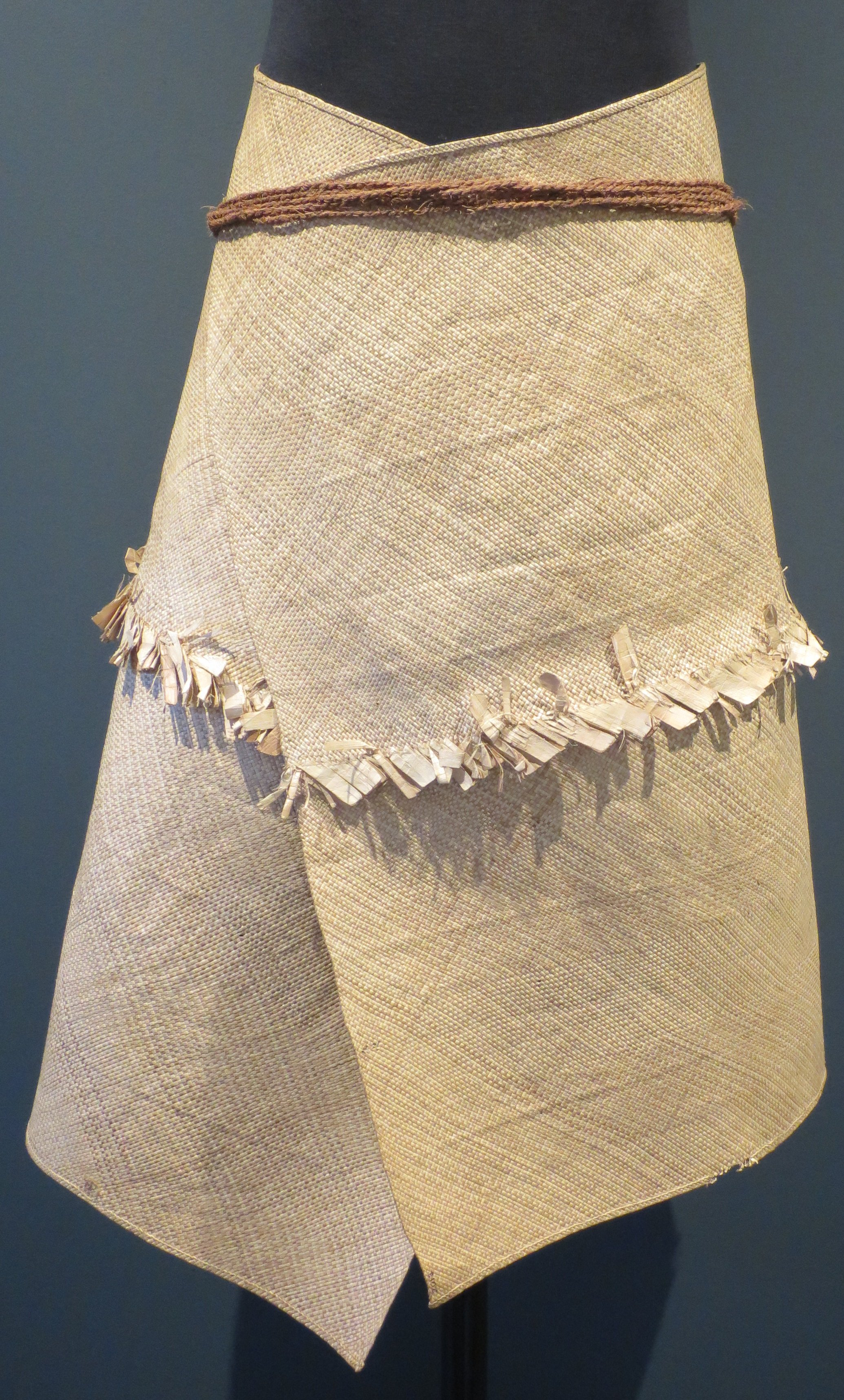
Kabae (man's dance mat) from Fanning Island, Kiribati, early 20th century, pandanus (Pandanus tectorius) plaiting, Honolulu Museum of Art (2013)

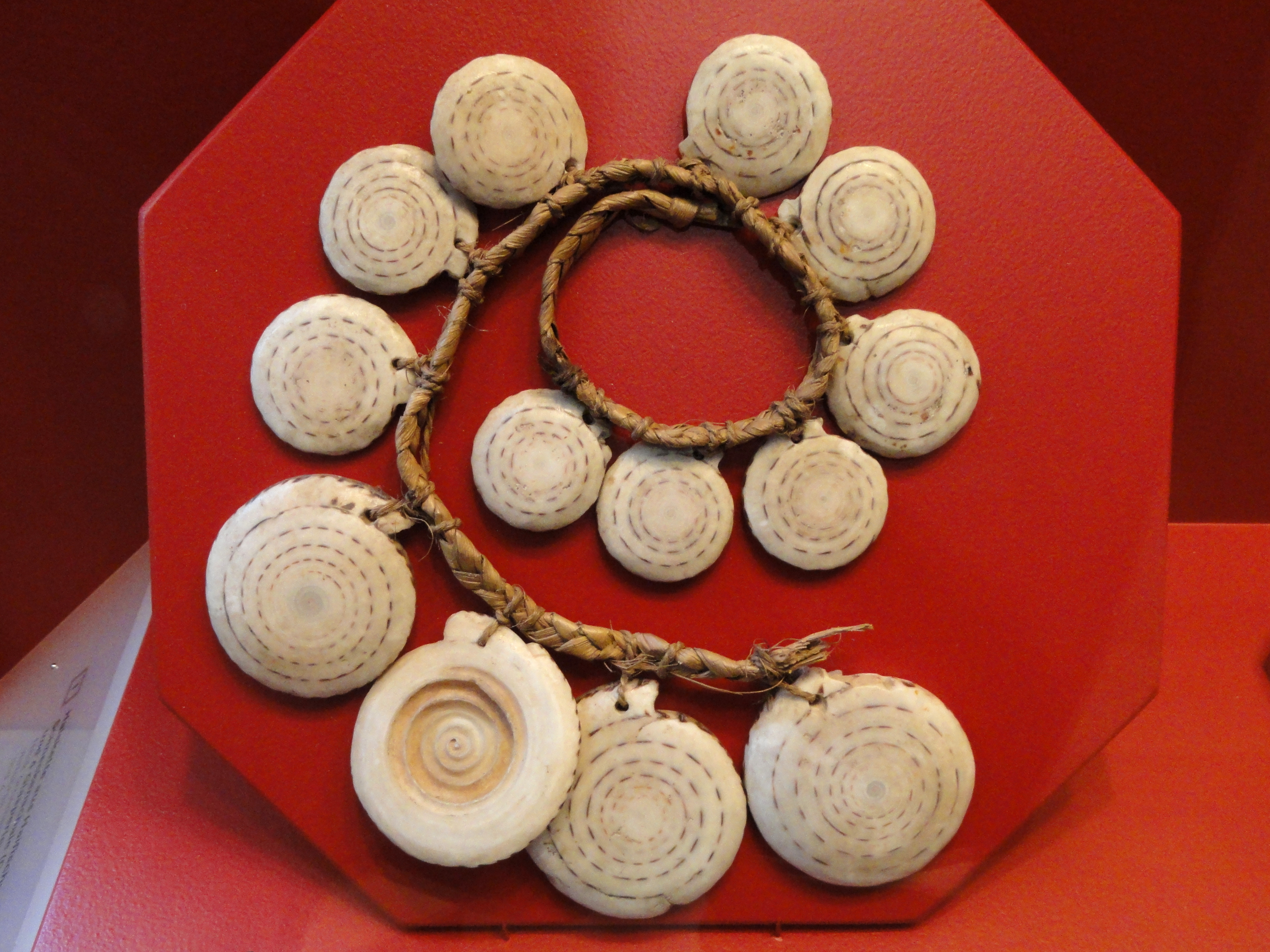
Dance ornament of conus shell and pandanus leaf string, Kiribati, 1891 - Staatlichen Museums für Völkerkunde München

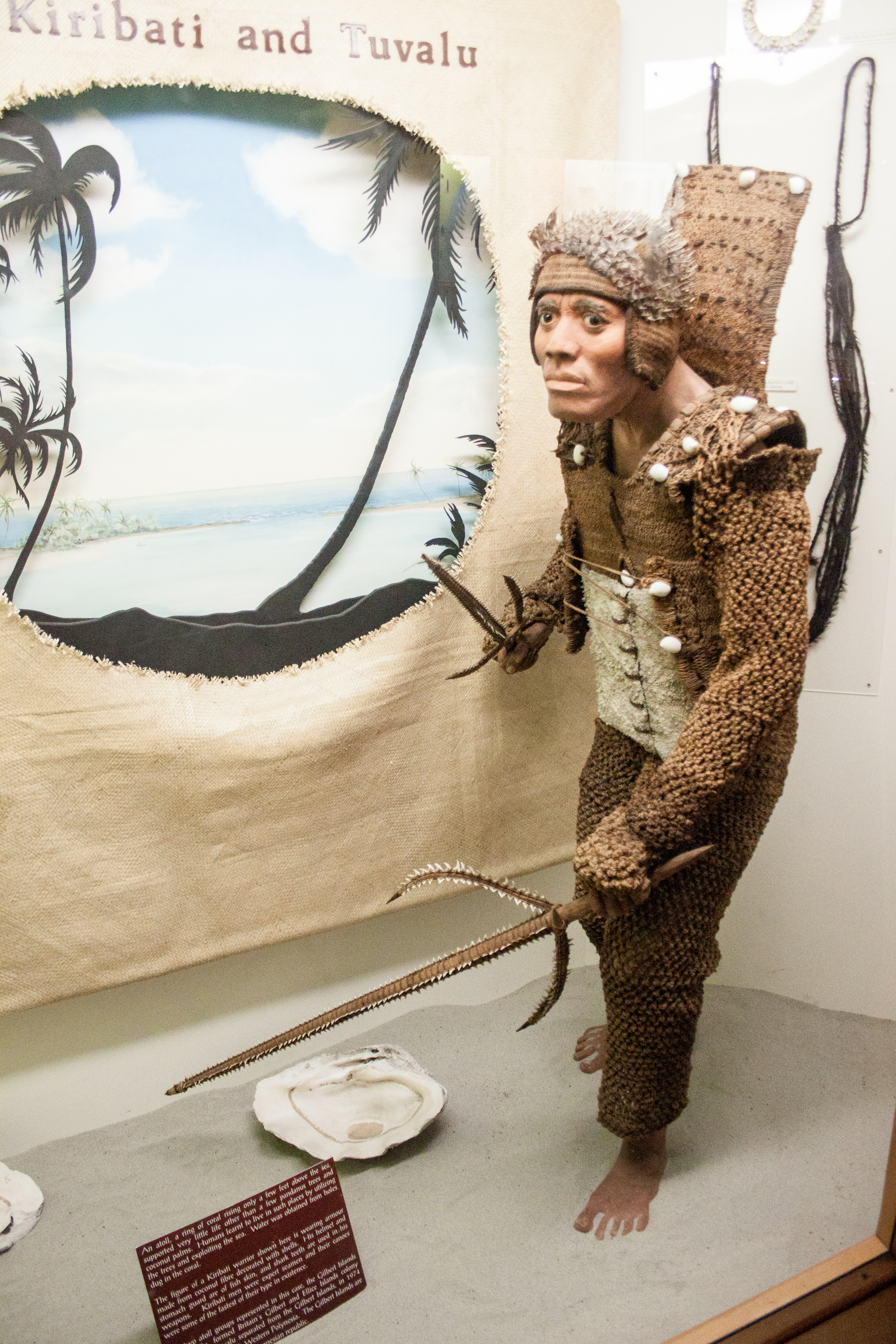
Display of objects from Kiribati and Tuvalu, Otago Museum, 2016

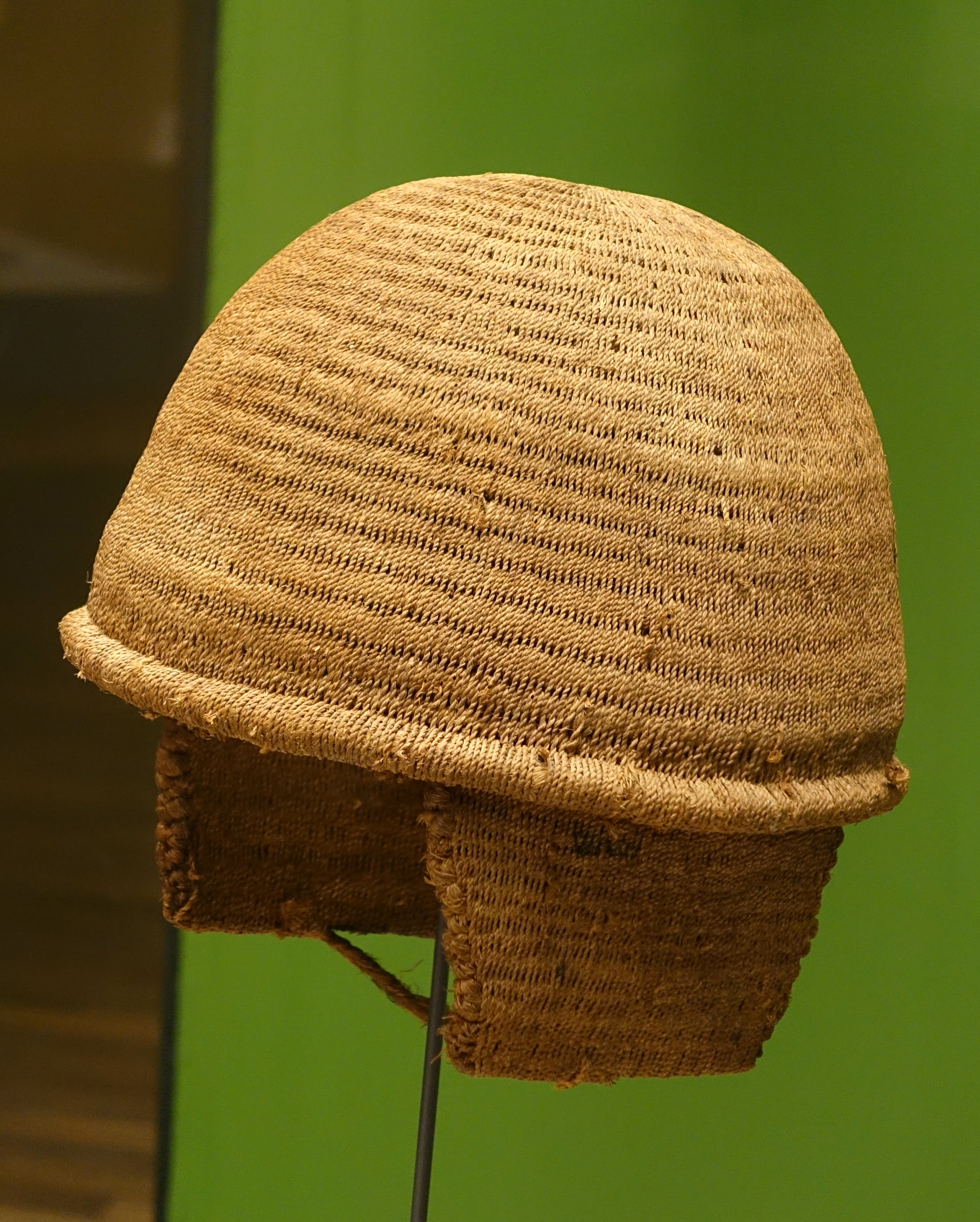
Helmet, Kiribati, 1895 - Ethnological Museum, Berlin
