= Eita, Kiribati =

Eita
- Settlement
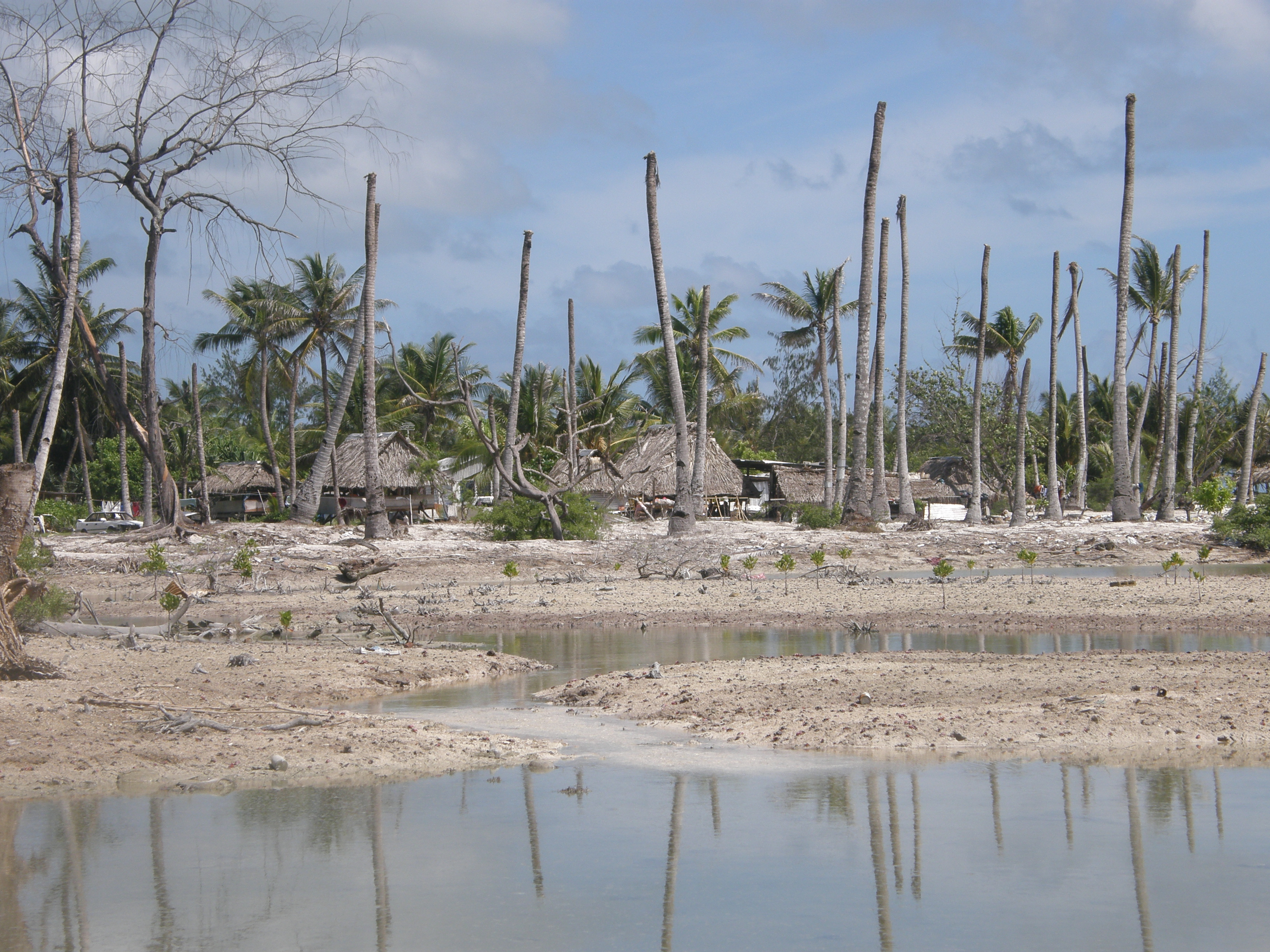
- Impacts of coastal erosion and drought on coconut palms in Eita, Tarawa, Kiribati

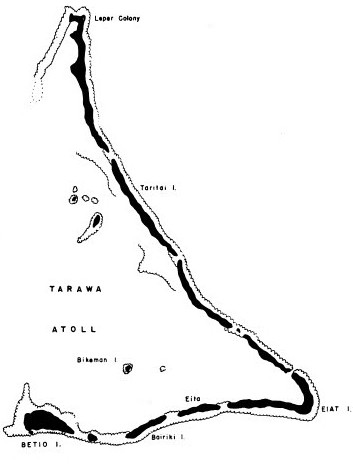
- Coordinates: 1°35′N 173°6′E
- Country: Kiribati

Eita is a settlement in Kiribati. It is located on an atoll in South Tarawa.
