= Bairiki =

- Town
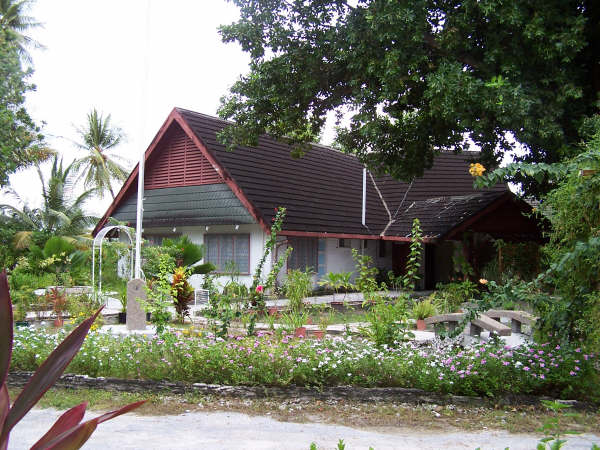
- State House in Bairiki

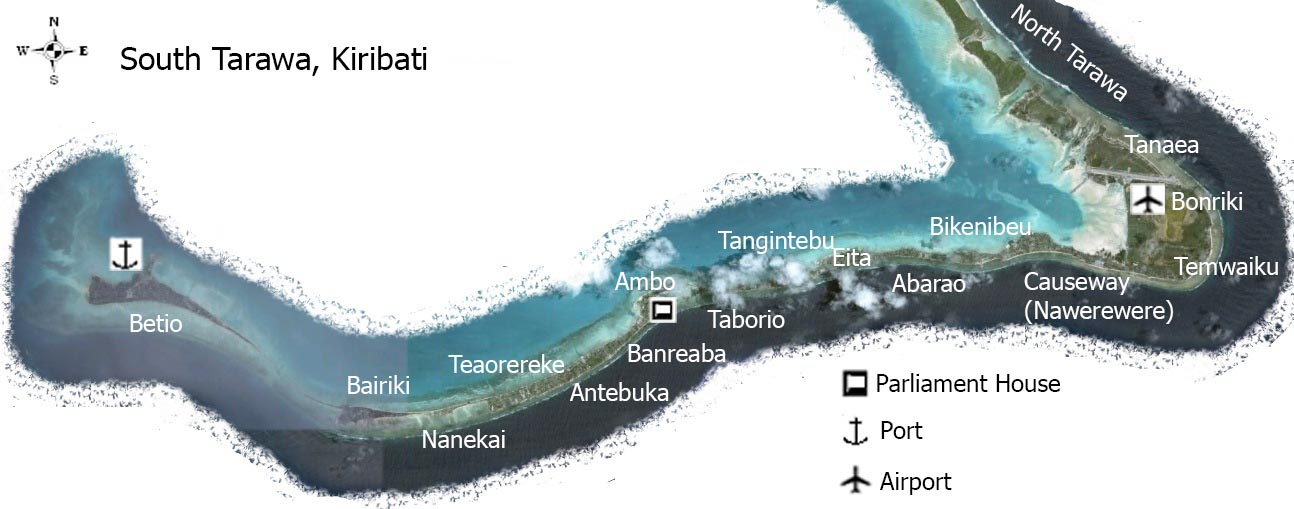
- Location in South Tarawa

- Location in Kiribati
- Coordinates: 01°19′32″N 172°59′00″E
- Country: Kiribati
- Island group: Gilbert Islands
- Atoll: Tarawa

Area
  - Total: 0.460128 km^{2} (0.177656 sq mi)
- Elevation: 3 m (9.8 ft)

Population (2010)
  - Total: 3,524
  - Density: 7,659/km^{2} (19,840/sq mi)

Bairiki is a town located in South Tarawa, Kiribati. It is crucial to the country's political and administrative structure as several governmental organizations and diplomatic missions are situated there.

== Landmarks ==
The State House, a building that serves as the official residence of Kiribati's head of state, is located in the center of Bairiki. It serves as both a historical and diplomatic landmark and a representation of the country's governance. The National Stadium, a location significant for holding numerous sporting events and national meetings.

== Overview ==
The High Commissions of Australia and New Zealand, as well as the embassy of China, are located in Bairiki. The majority of Government Ministries have their headquarters in this community.

The Teinainano Urban Council (TUC), which is in charge of managing many facets of local government and community development, has administrative control over Bairiki. The TUC is essential in preserving Bairiki's infrastructure and public services, assuring the welfare and prosperity of its residents.

The 2010 Census estimated Bairiki's population to be 3,524.

== Geography ==
Bairiki is an islet near the Western end of South Tarawa. It is joined to Betio by the Nippon Causeway, which opened in 1989, and is also joined to Naanekai by a causeway, forming part of a continuous road which links South Tarawa from Betio in the West to Bonriki International Airport in the East.

Bairiki is a small islet, with a land area of less than half a square km. Much of the land is occupied by the Government itself, including the Bairiki National Stadium and the main offices of many of the Government ministries, and by foreign High Commissions with their associated residences. The village community of Bairiki lives in very crowded conditions, and rapid population growth is causing significant problems.

== Education ==
King George V School, a secondary school for boys, opened in Bairiki in 1922. It later moved to Abemama. Currently, there is also the Taaken Bairiki primary school, which in 2024, led a beach clean-up in Kiribati to mark World Oceans Day.

== Transport ==
The city has road connections to Betio and Nanikai

Census	1978	2005	2010
Bairiki	1,956	2,766	3,524

== See also ==
- Bairiki National Stadium
