= Bikenibeu =

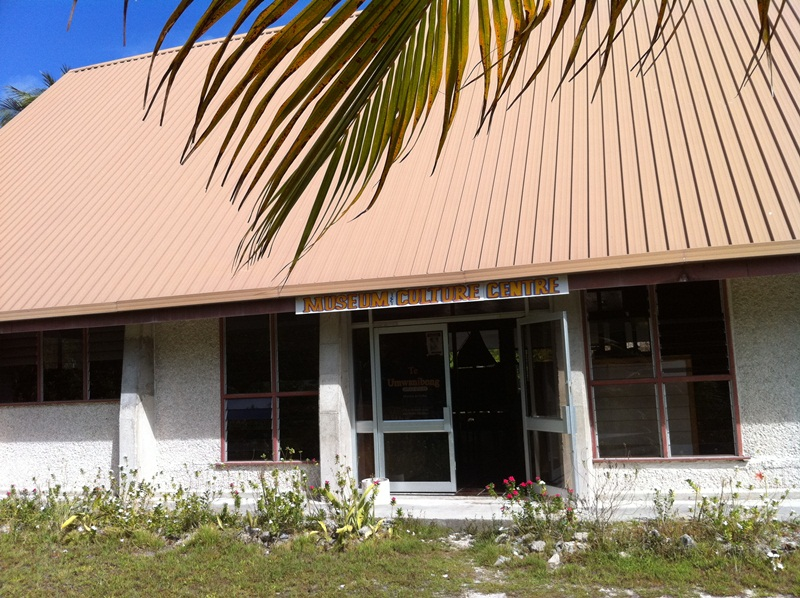
- Cultural Museum in Bikenibeu

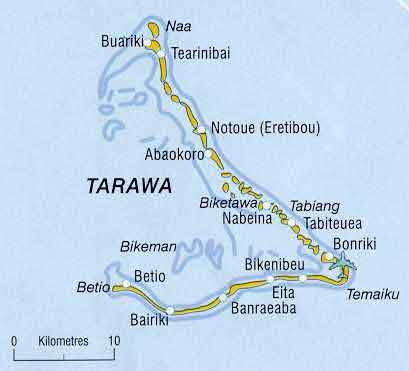

- Location within Kiribati Location within Pacific Ocean
- Coordinates: 1.367°N 173.126°E
- Country: Kiribati
- Island group: Gilbert Islands
- Atoll: Tarawa
- Locality: South Tarawa

Area
  - Total: 1.81 km^{2} (0.70 sq mi)

Population (2010)
  - Total: 6,568
  - Density: 3,630/km^{2} (9,400/sq mi)

Bikenibeu is a settlement in Kiribati. It is located close to the southeastern corner of the Tarawa atoll, part of the island country of Kiribati. It is part of a nearly continuous chain of settlements along the islands of South Tarawa, which are now linked by causeways. The low-lying atoll is vulnerable to sea level rise. Rapid population growth has caused some environmental problems. Kiribati's main government high school, King George V and Elaine Bernachi School, is located in Bikenibeu, as well as the Ministries of Environment and Education.

== Location ==
Bikenibeu is one of the three main urban centres in South Tarawa, the others being Betio and Teaoraereke. Starting in 1963, causeways began to be built between the islands of the atoll to make communications easier. The causeways connected Bairiki to Bikenibeu by 1963, and extended from Bikenibeu to Bonriki by 1964, when flights began from the new airport to Fiji.

Bikenibeu island lies between the Tarawa Lagoon to the north, with a maximum depth of 25 metres (82 ft), and the Pacific Ocean to the south, with a depth of up to 4,000 metres (13,000 ft).

The island has been built from sediments from the lagoon.

The process of soil accumulation is driven by the dominant easterly trade winds, and can be reversed during extended periods of westerly winds during El Niño–Southern Oscillations.

Bikenibeu is an average of 3.25 metres (10.7 ft) above sea level on the ocean side, and 2.38 metres (7 ft 10 in) at the lagoon side. Tidal flats on the ocean side extend for 160 metres (520 ft).

ACLR (Accelerated Sea-Level Rise) is a serious concern. In a scenario where a sea level rise of .5 metres (1 ft 8 in) occurs, 71% of Bikenibeu would be flooded by a spring high tide. With a rise of .95 metres (3 ft 1 in) the tide would flood the entire island.

As of 2000, the lagoon away from the shore was still relatively free of human contaminants. However, the causeways linking the islands of South Tarawa have contributed to increasing pollution in the lagoon.

The coral reefs provide natural protection to the coastline, important if sea levels rise. A 2000 report noted large numbers of dead corals on the reef flats on the ocean side, apparently due to past discharges of sewerage. The causeways and land reclamation have also affected the reef environment.

Other environmental problems caused by the growing population include over-fishing and reduction of useful plants and trees such as coconuts.

== Population ==
As of 1996, South Tarawa was almost continuously settled from the Bonriki International Airport through Bikenibeu to Bairiki in the west.

In 1996, there were 4,885 people living on Bikenibeu island, with an area of 1.81 square kilometres (0.70 sq mi).

As of 2005, the population was 6,170, living in 831 households.

By 2010, the population had grown to 6,568.

Migration and population pressure has caused a number of families to build homes on vacant land, becoming squatters.

== Facilities ==
In 1953, the decision was made to build facilities for the medical and education departments at Bikenibeu.

A permanent hospital was built at Bikenibeu in 1956.

Several ministries are based in the settlement. These include the Ministry of Education, and the Ministry of Environment, Lands and Agricultural Development. The Ministry of Health and the nursing school are now housed in a new hospital in the neighbouring village of Nawerewere that was built in 1991 with aid from Japan. This is the country's main hospital for medicine, surgery and anaesthetics, paediatrics, obstetrics and gynaecology, and psychiatry, and includes a laboratory, pharmacy and x-ray facility. The general hospital has 160 beds. There is also a dental clinic.

A power plant in Bikenibeu provides a mains electrical service; the hospital at Nawerewere is supplied by the grid, and also had back-up power for essential services.

After a cholera epidemic in 1977 a reticulated sewerage system was installed, using sea water as the conveyance medium. (Note: Use of seawater to transport sewage can be a viable and cost-effective option in island communities such as Tarawa where potable water is in short supply – and even in larger cities such as Hong Kong.)

The King George V school was moved from temporary buildings at Abemama and established in a new building in Bikenibeu in June 1953.

The Elaine Bernacchi Secondary School for girls opened 1959, named after the wife of the Resident Commissioner at the time, Michael Bernacchi.

Also in the late 1950s, the Tarawa Teachers' College began to operate in Bikenibeu.

The two Bikenibeu secondary schools began to be integrated from 1965. They are now a single co-educational school run by the government – KGV/EBS.

Education in Kiribati is compulsory and free from age six to fourteen (year 9).

Church missions provide secondary education for year 10–13 pupils who fail to be admitted to KGV/EBS.

Preachers of the Baháʼí Faith came to Kiribati in 1954, setting up their first centre in Abaiang. The Baháʼí Faith was recognised as a legal religion in 1955. The Baháʼís moved to Bikenibeu in 1957, where they established a centre and housing for resident or travelling teachers. In 1967, the Kiribati Baháʼís set up an independent National Spiritual Assembly with headquarters in Bikenibeu. The Baháʼí Faith in Kiribati claimed 4,000 members in 1985.

There is also a Catholic church dedicated to Saint Peter, and a number of smaller Catholic and Protestant churches and maneaba.

Te Umanibong, a cultural centre that features local artefacts, is open weekdays.

Bikenibeu Post Office opened on 1 July 1958.

== Notable people ==
- Bikenibeu Paeniu – Prime Minister of Tuvalu for two terms

== See also ==
- List of towns and villages in Kiribati
