= List of towns and villages in Kiribati =

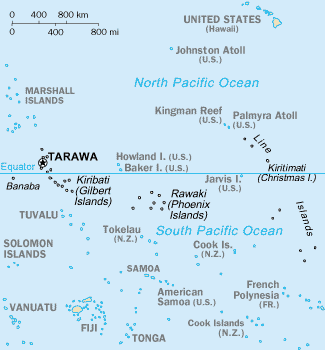
Map of Kiribati.

This is a list of towns and villages in Kiribati. There are no cities in the country.

== List of villages ==
=== Banaba Island ===
==== Banaba ====
- Antereen
- Umwa
- Tabewa
- Buakonikai (uninhabited village)

=== Northern Gilbert Islands ===
==== Makin ====
- Kiebu
- Little Makin
- Bikin Eitei (uninhabited village)
- Aonibike (uninhabited village)
- Tebua Tarawa (uninhabited village)
- Onne (uninhabited village)

==== Butaritari ====
- Kuuma
- Keuea
- Tanimainiku
- Tanimaiaki
- Tabonuea
- Antekana
- Taubukinmeang
- Temanokunuea
- Onomaru
- Ukiangang
- Bikaati
- Tikurere

==== Marakei ====
- Rawannawi
- Temotu
- Buota
- Tekarakan
- Bwainuna
- Norauea
- Tekuanga
- Antai

==== Abaiang ====
- Nuotaea
- Ribono
- Takarano
- Ubwanteman
- Tebunginako
- Borotiam
- Aonobuaka
- Koinawa
- Morikao
- Ewena
- Taburao
- Tebero
- Tabwiroa
- Tuarabu
- Tanimaiaki
- Tebwanga
- Aoneaba
- Tabontebike

=== Tarawa ===
==== North Tarawa ====
- Buariki
- Tearinibai
- Nuatabu
- Tebwangaroi
- Taratai
- Nooto
- Abaokoro
- Marenanuka
- Tabonibara
- Kainaba
- Nabeina
- Tabiteuea
- Abatao
- Buota

==== South Tarawa ====
- Tanaea
- Bonriki
- Temwaiku
- Causeway
- Bikenibeu
- Abarao
- Eita
- Tangintebu
- Taborio
- Ambo
- Banraeaba
- Antebuka
- Teaoraereke
- Nanikai
- Bairiki
- Betio (Note: Betio is the populated place that represents the Betio Town Council; while the rest of the villages within South Tarawa represent the Teinainano Urban Council.)

=== Central Gilbert Islands ===
==== Maiana ====
- Tebikerai
- Tekaranga
- Tematantongo
- Aobike
- Tebanga
- Temwangaua
- Toora
- Tebwangetua
- Teitai
- Tebiauea
- Raweai
- Bubutei

==== Abemama ====
- Abatiku
- Tabiang
- Tekatirirake
- Tanimainiku
- Kauma
- Baretoa
- Tabontebike
- Kariatebike
- Bangotantekabaia
- Tebanga
- Manoku
- Kabangaki
- Biike

==== Kuria ====
- Oneeke
- Manenaua
- Tabontebike
- Buariki
- Norauea
- Bouatoa

==== Aranuka ====
- Takaeang
- Buariki
- Baurua

=== Southern Gilbert Islands ===
==== Nonouti ====
- Abamakoro
- Benuaroa
- Teuabu
- Temanoku
- Rotuma
- Autukia
- Matang
- Taboiaki
- Temotu

==== Tabiteuea North ====
- Tekabwibwi
- Tekaman
- Tanaeang
- Buota
- Terikiai
- Eita
- Utiroa
- Tauma
- Kabuna
- Tenatorua
- Bangai
- Aiwa

==== Tabiteuea South ====
- Tewai
- Taungaeaka
- Buariki
- Nikutoru
- Katabanga
- Taku

==== Beru ====
- Autukia
- Tabiang
- Aoniman
- Rongorongo
- Nuka
- Teteirio
- Taubukinberu
- Eriko
- Taboiaki

==== Nikunau ====
- Muribenua
- Tabutoa
- Rungata
- Manriki
- Nikumanu
- Tabomatang

==== Onotoa ====
- Tekawa
- Tanaenag
- Buariki
- Temao
- Otowae
- Aiaki
- Tabuarorae

==== Tamana ====
- Barebuka
- Bakaka
- Bakarawa

==== Arorae ====
- Tamaroa
- Roreti

=== Line Islands ===
==== Teraina ====
- Abaiang
- Kauamwemwe
- Uteute
- Tangkore
- Matanibike
- Arabata
- Mwakeitari
- Onauea
- Kaaitara (uninhabited village)

==== Tabuaeran ====
- Tereitaki
- Betania
- Paelau
- Aontenaa
- Tereitannano
- Aramari
- Terine
- Eten

==== Kiritimati ====
- London
- Tabwakea
- Banana
- Poland
- Paris

=== Phoenix Islands ===
==== Canton ====
- Tebaronga
