= Buariki =

Buariki may refer to several places in Kiribati:

- Buariki (Tarawa), an island in northern Tarawa Atoll and site of the World War II Battle of Buariki
  - Buariki, a village on Tarawa
- Buariki (Tabiteuea), a settlement on Tabiteuea Atoll
- Buariki (Aranuka), the largest island in Aranuka Atoll
  - Buariki, a village on the Aranuka
- Buariki (Kuria), the larger of the two Kuria islands
- Buariki (Onotoa), the northernmost island in the Onotoa Atoll
