= Emmanuel Rougier =

French Catholic missionary (1864–1932)

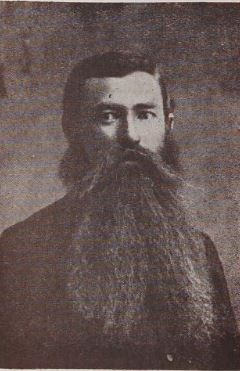
- Born: 26 August 1864; La Chomette, France
- Died: 16 December 1932 (aged 68); Tahiti
- Burial place: Papeete, Tahiti
- Other names: Santa Claus, King of Christmas Island
- Occupations: Missionary, businessman
- Known for: buying Fanning, Washington and Christmas Islands
- Parent(s): Benoit and Marie-Louise Rougier
- Relatives: Félix de Jesús Rougier, Stanislas Rougier
- Religion: Catholic
- Ordained: 1888

Pierre Joseph Emmanuel Rougier (1864–1932), known as Emmanuel, was a French Catholic missionary priest, landowner and businessman in Fiji and Tahiti. He served as a priest in Fiji before embarking on business activities and amassing a fortune through his association with Gustave Cecille, a former French convict. Rougier bought Christmas Island (Kiritimati), the main atoll in Kiribati, and developed a coconut plantation there before later settling in Tahiti.

== Early life ==
Rougier was born on 26 August 1864 at La Chomette, a commune in the arrondissement of Brioude in the Auvergne region of France, to Benoît Rougier and Louise or Marie-Louise (née Olanier). In 1872 the Rougiers bought the Château des Isles at Lavaudieu, where Rougier enjoyed a pleasant childhood. Rougier was taught at home by his mother, then sent for six years to La Chartreuse, Le Puy before higher education at Riom and St. Chamond. He spent two years on divinity studies under the Sulpicians at Le Puy, and studied for two years in England and Spain. Rougier was ordained as a priest by Bishop Vidal on 24 June 1888. This required special permission from Rome because Rougier was under 24 years old.

== Missionary work in Fiji ==
Three days after being ordained, Rougier left France for Fiji with Bishop Vidal, who would become the Vicar Apostolic of Fiji. They left Marseilles on 27 June on the French ship MMS Caledonien, arriving at Sydney on 5 August, then travelled on the SS Tenterden to Suva, where Vidal's party was met with a warm welcome by other Catholics on 29 August 1888. The arrival of the Catholics was seen as competition by the Methodist missionaries already in Fiji. Fijians at this time were regarded as fierce people, cannibals and polygamists. Rougier commented: "plus ils sont dégoûtants, sales au physique ou au moral, plus je veux les aimer, je suis venu pour eux…" ["the more disgusting, dirty they are physically or morally, the more I want to love them, I came for them…"]. Rougier became a very active missionary but also often came into conflict with the hierarchy of the church. Rougier learned to speak Fijian and was known by the Fijians as 'Manuélé'.

=== Naililili, Fiji ===
Posted to the Rewa Catholic mission station at Naililili on the Rewa River delta, Rougier oversaw the construction of solid concrete buildings in 1895. A presbytery was built in 1896 and a convent in 1897. Rougier opened a school at Naililili in 1899, staffed by Marist brothers, where Fijian boys could learn English: at that time, Methodist mission schools only taught reading and writing in Fijian. The school proved popular, even with Methodist families.

In 1902, the Tui Namosi (high chief) Matanitobua of Namosi and hundreds of his people converted from Methodism to Catholicism. Sources differ as to whether Rougier persuaded the chief to convert, or whether the chief sought him out after his wife had a disagreement with the Fijian Methodist preacher at Namosi. The chief himself is reported to have decided that the Catholics did more to minister to the people than the Methodists. In connection with the conversions, Rougier was also accused of publicly burning hundreds of Methodist bibles at Naililili, but he stated that Catholic sisters at the mission had privately cremated Catholic linens and a kerosene tin full of old Methodist bibles, as it was Catholic practice to burn sacred items that were "worn out and useless". He said that Methodist bibles in good condition had not been burned. The mass conversion and rumours about the bible-burning earned Rougier the nickname "Poacher Rougier" and caused hostility between the Methodist and Catholic churches in Fiji.

In the early 1900s, Rougier designed and supervised the building of a large church at Naililili, which was opened and consecrated by Bishop Vidal at Easter in 1905. The church had two towers at the front. It was 156 feet (48 m) long and 100 feet (30 m) wide and could seat over 800 people. It was made of concrete and contained 25 stained glass windows made in France with Fijian inscriptions, a big clock, and bronze bells. As of 2025, the church still stands but is in disrepair. Its formal name was the Church of St Joseph the Husband of Mary, but it is commonly known as Naililili Cathedral.

=== Pentecost, Vanuatu ===
In 1898, Rougier was part of a group of Catholic missionaries who visited Pentecost Island in Vanuatu. About 150 labourers from Vanuatu had been working in Fiji, and the idea was that they would spread Catholicism to Vanuatu when they returned to their homes there. Rougier visited Sydney and Noumea to collect funds and supplies for the Pentecost mission and was able to establish a Catholic presence at four mission stations on Pentecost Island.

=== Bau, Fiji ===
The district of Bau, led by Ratu Seru Cakobau, was considered the seat of Methodism in Fiji. Rougier befriended another chief of Bau, Ratu Joni Colata, who gave him some land to construct a small wooden Catholic chapel. Although Methodist missionaries protested to Ratu Kadavulevu, grandson of King Cakobau, the project went ahead and the chapel was opened on Sunday 11 February 1906 by Bishop Vidal, attended by priests including Rougier. The Fiji Times reported the opening weekend as a great success, with a band playing, singing, a conjurer, and a bazaar selling "numerous dainties and viands". However The Methodist published a rebuttal of the Fiji Times article by the Superintendent of the Methodist Mission at Bau, who said that the opening festivities were a failure: Catholics from other areas participated, but the local Bauan people were not interested at all. He went on: "Evidently, the success of the opening ceremonies did not warrant a continuance of the services. The bell rang feebly once again for evening prayer; and once again on the Monday .morning, and has since maintained a judicious silence". A local teacher named Pierre was left in charge at Bau but failed to convert local people to Catholicism. Rougier was unavailable to help much because he was too often absent on other business, having by this time obtained access to the fortune of Gustave Cecille.

== Gustave Cecille and conflict with the church ==
Around 1906, an escaped French convict named Gustave Athanase Cecille arrived at Rougier's mission station. Cecille said that he been serving a sentence at the French penal colony at New Caledonia, but had escaped in a small boat. Rougier was sympathetic and Cecille began working for him. Cecille remained in Fiji and married a local woman, Katarina Biaukula (also known as Katherine), in November 1906, with Rougier performing the ceremony. When Bishop Vidal learned that Rougier had performed Cecille's marriage ceremony he criticised Rougier, saying that mixed marriage was against the rules of the church, and threatened to send Rougier to a new mission in the New Hebrides. At some stage Cecille had disclosed that he came from a wealthy family and that there was a fortune waiting for him in trust in France. He did not want to return to France, and told Rougier that if he could effect a pardon for Cecille, he could have Cecille's fortune and Cecille would keep just an annuity. Rougier investigated Cecille's story and found that it was true. Shortly after Cecille's marriage, Rougier and Gustave Cecille travelled to France, presumably to sort out Cecille's inheritance. Rougier got Cecille pardoned and obtained the money from France. As agreed, he gave Cecille an annuity and kept the rest of the money, intending to use it for the church's work. Gustave left Katarina in 1907, returned to France and died there in 1913.

Further conflict with his superiors arose when Rougier began spending his new fortune. He began travelling and engaging in business activities in Fiji under his own name, with the assistance of his brother Stanislas who had come to visit him at Naililili. He was involved in a bakery and selling firewood and groceries in local stores, and he invested in real estate at Koronivia. In 1907, after obtaining Cecille's fortune, Rougier bough Fanning Island and Washington Island.

Bishop Vidal and Father Nicolas, the bishop's administrator, reminded Rougier of his vow of poverty and said he could only accept and use funds with the permission of the church. As a result, in 1909 Rougier was removed from the Society of Mary for leaving his position without without permission. He sold all his assets in Fiji and moved to Fanning Island in August 1909.

Before leaving Fiji, Rougier acquired rights to 12,000 hectares of silver-bearing land. He granted mining concessions to the land which gained him another income stream for many years.

== Fanning Island and Washington Island ==
Fanning Island (now known as Tabuaeran) is an atoll in Kiribati. William Greig, H F King and later George Bicknell lived on Fanning Island for many years from 1857, growing coconuts on both Fanning and Washington Islands and selling fish, pearl shell and other products to the ships that visited occasionally. Rougier bought Fanning Island and Washington Island (now known as Teraina) from Greig's son George Greig for £25,000 (equivalent to £2,600,221 in 2025) in a complicated deal in November 1907. The Australian Prime Minister was asked about the sale. He said he had never heard of Father Rougier, and thought that a Catholic priest would be unlikely to buy an island. He was also concerned about British interests on the island, including plans to use it as a repeating station for a wireless telegraph system, and doubted that the island would be sold to a foreign buyer.

Rougier minted his own aluminium one-dollar coins for use on Fanning and Washington Islands.

In October 1911, Rougier sold both islands to a Canadian syndicate for £70,000 (equivalent to £7,128,940 in 2025). He then charted a schooner, Luka, to take himself and an inspector representing the purchaser from Honolulu to Fanning Island. Captain Frederick C Miller was master of the Luka. He took Rougier to court in May 1913, stating that he was owed commission on the sale of Fanning Island. Rougier had also made overtures to the Japanese government, suggesting that Fanning Island would be a good base for Japanese navy vessels. The islands later became British protectorates and the High Commissioner of the Western Pacific made an order stating that they could only be sold to British interests.

== Christmas Island ==
After Rougier sold Fanning and Washington Islands, he leased Christmas Island (now known as Kiritimati, the main atoll of Kiribati) in 1913. He lived on the island until 1916, then settled in Tahiti. Rougier explored Christmas Island in 1912 (and later) and recorded archaeological sites that he found, including six stone-lined graves that he thought were European, tombs with bones and ashes, and the remains of villages. He published his findings in 1914 and 1917.

Rougier planted coconut trees on Christmas Island and leased the island from Levers Pacific Plantation Limited for 99 years. Tahitian laborers were brought to the island to work on the plantation. Rougier bought a schooner, the Ysabel May, which traveled from Tahiti to Christmas Island a few times a year with supplies, leaving Christmas Island for San Francisco with a cargo of copra.

In 1916, Rougier traveled to San Francisco with his niece and her companion. Traveling to Victoria, British Columbia, he bought a schooner, the Ysabel May. The schooner had been built in Lunenburg, Nova Scotia, in 1910, to hunt fur seals. Relocating to Victoria, the sealing industry declined, and the Ysabel May had had been laid up indefinitely. Once sold and re-outfitted, the schooner was loaded with supplies in Victoria and Oakland, California, with stores and supplies for life on Christmas Island, including two Model-T Fords. Another source reported that Rougier would use the schooner in missionary work in Tahiti.

In 1916 Rougier designed his own Christmas Island postage stamp. Printed in San Francisco, it portrays the Ysabel May approaching Christmas Island. The stamp was not recognized by the Universal Postal Union and was never valid for postage, but it was and is sought after by philatelists.

In October 1919, shocking events on Christmas Island came to light. In 1916, Rougier had hired Joe English as an accountant in San Francisco and sent him out on the Ysabel May to Christmas Island. After a trip back to San Francisco, English returned to Christmas Island in October 1917 to replace the manager there. The manager left on the Ysabel May, and English was left in charge on the island. The labourers on the island took a dislike to English, and on 30 December 1917 they mutinied and attempted to murder him. English survived alone for a month until he could regain control and lock up the ringleaders of the mutiny. The Ysabel May returned to the island at the end of July 1918 but got stuck on a reef. Rougier finally turned up on a steamer, the Saint Francoise, on 23 August. Copra supplies and all the rebellious labourers were loaded on to the steamer, and it left for Fanning Island with the patched-up Ysabel May in tow. English was left on the island with a young Frenchman named Lucien and Tiaran, a Tahitian. They had some provisions and were told that they would be relieved within 40 days. However they were stranded on the island for over a year until the battlecruiser New Zealand (with Admiral Jellicoe on board) picked them up in October 1919. The three men were starving and half-mad due to their privations. The men did not know that the war was over, and met the men of the New Zealand with a revolver, thinking they were German. A possible reason for the men being left alone on the island for so long is the 1918 influenza pandemic. The pandemic reached Tahiti on 16 November 1918 on the ship Navua, and within weeks up to 25% of the population of Tahiti had died.

Rougier was known for his full beard, described by Joe English: "I have never seen any one in the world with a beard like Rougier's, a vast, billowy mass of black hair, streaked with gray. It resembled a mass of seaweed flowing down to his waist, and the white in it was like drifting sea foam". As he aged, Rougier's beard turned white and earned him the nickname 'Santa Claus'. He was also known as 'The King of Christmas Island'.

In 1925, when Rougier was in bad health, he entrusted the administration of Christmas Island to his nephew Paul-Emmanuel Rougier.

== Business activities in Tahiti ==
After leaving Christmas Island in 1916, Rougier settled permanently in Tahiti and continued his business activities, although he still considered himself a priest. He lived on a large estate called Taaone at Pīra'e, and also owned land at Bora Bora, the Papenoo Valley and other locations. Rougier became successively "President of the Chamber of Agriculture, Member of the Council of Administration, President of the Society of Oceanic Studies, of the Syndicate Agricole, and of the Syndicate d'Initiative (Tourist Association), of which latter body he was the founder and continuous President since its inception, and had again been unanimously re-elected to that important position the day before his untimely end".

In 1929, Rougier bought the schooner Fisherman from American author Zane Grey, renaming it the Marechal Foch. While Rougier owned it, Marechal Foch was used as a rum-runner, taking alcohol from Tahiti to mother ships on Rum Row at Cape Colnett in California during the Prohibition Era in the United States. It could carry about 15,000 cases of alcohol.

== Personal life ==
Rougier was interested in ethnography and was one of the founding members and fourth president of the Société des Études Océaniennes (Society of Oceanian Studies) which was established in Tahiti in 1917.

From 1916, the heirs of Gustave Cecille attempted unsuccessfully to sue Rougier for Cecille's fortune.

There were rumours about the relationship between Rougier and Katarina, the wife of Gustave Cecille, who stayed with Rougier after Gustave Cecille left her in 1907 to return to France. Katarina also accompanied Rougier on a trip to France. When Rougier died, he left Katarina Cecille £650 (Australian). She had already inherited 50,000 francs when her mother-in-law died. Rougier also left a letter for Katarina, but its contents are unknown. When a journalist stated in 1947 that Rougier had married a Tahitian and had a daughter, his outraged relatives swiftly denied the allegation. They stated that though Rougier had ceased to be a missionary, he remained a priest till the end of his life. The woman that the journalist had met and assumed was Rougier's daughter was actually his niece.

Rougier died of a heart attack on 16 December 1932 at Tahiti, and is buried at Uranie Cemetery in Papeete. He left Christmas Island and most of his estate including the Marechal Foch to his nephew Paul-Emmanuel Rougier, and made bequests to other family members, Katarina and his housekeeper Marie Pugeault.
