= Tabomatang =

Coordinates: 1°24′S 176°29′E

Tabomatang is a village settlement on Nikunau Island in Kiribati. It is located near the southern end of the island; the nearest locations, a mile or two to the north, are Manriki and Nikumanu. The village has a population of less than 100 nowadays, a shadow of its former self, with so many people having migrated to Tarawa Atoll. The village has several mwenga, a Protestant church and a church mwaneaba. The Te Atu ni Uea mwaneaba is now in ruins. It had 18 boti – for a floor plan, see Latouche, 1983, p. 74. Tabomatang may have been the village that HMS Dolphin, under the command of John Byron, stood off in 1765, according to Byron and Clerke (1767, pp. 135–138).
