= Nonouti =

Atoll and district of Kiribati

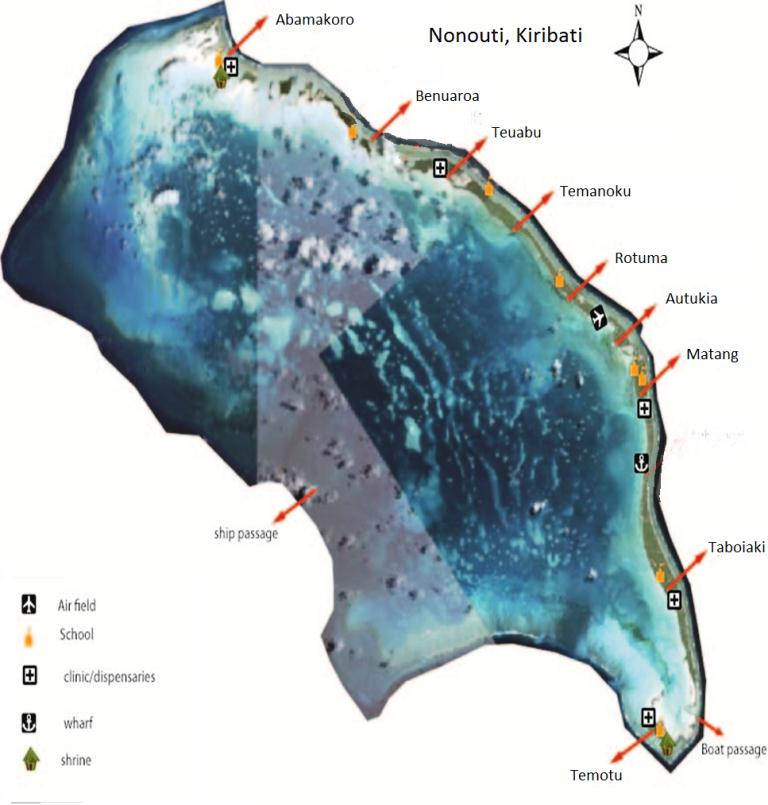
- Map of Nonouti

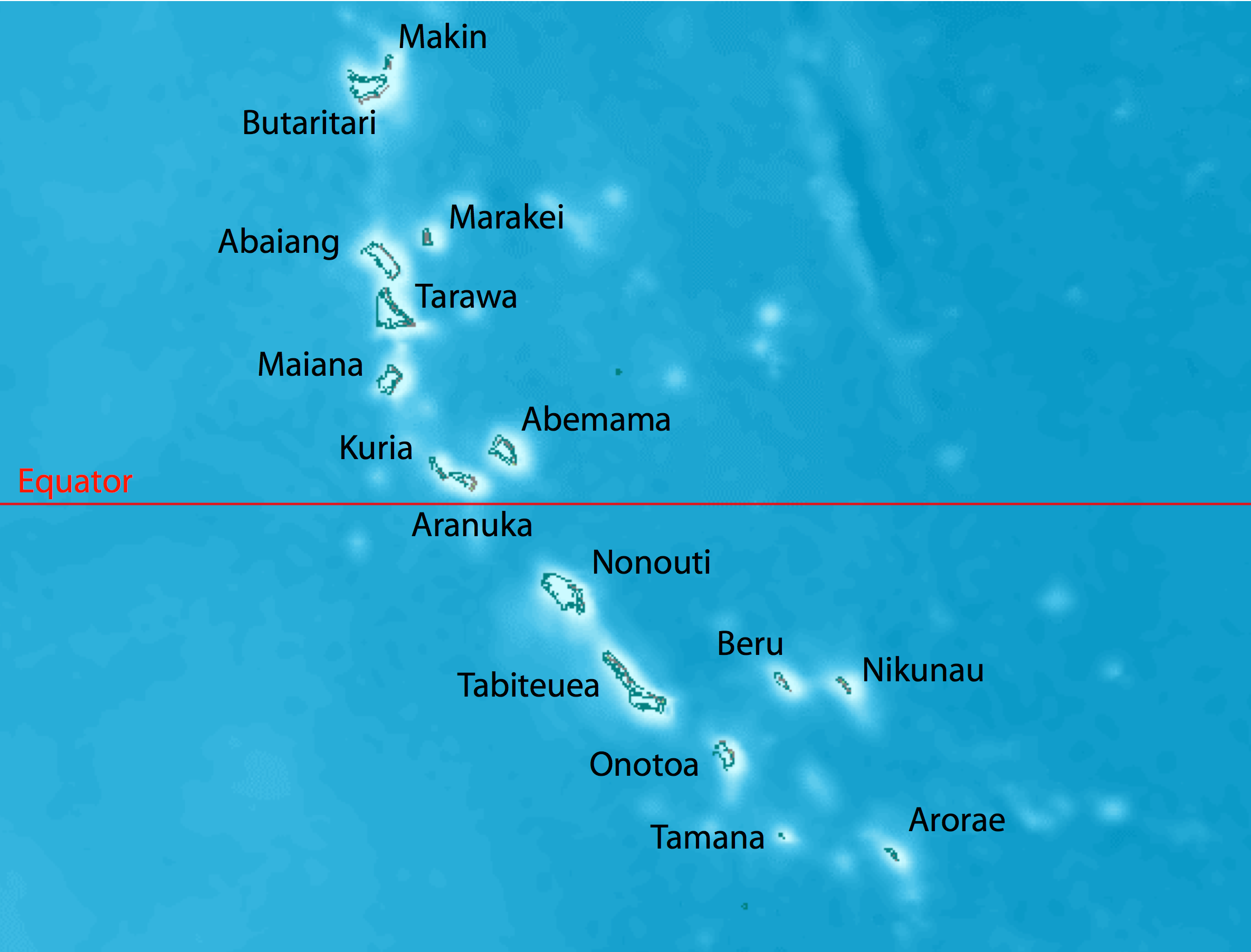

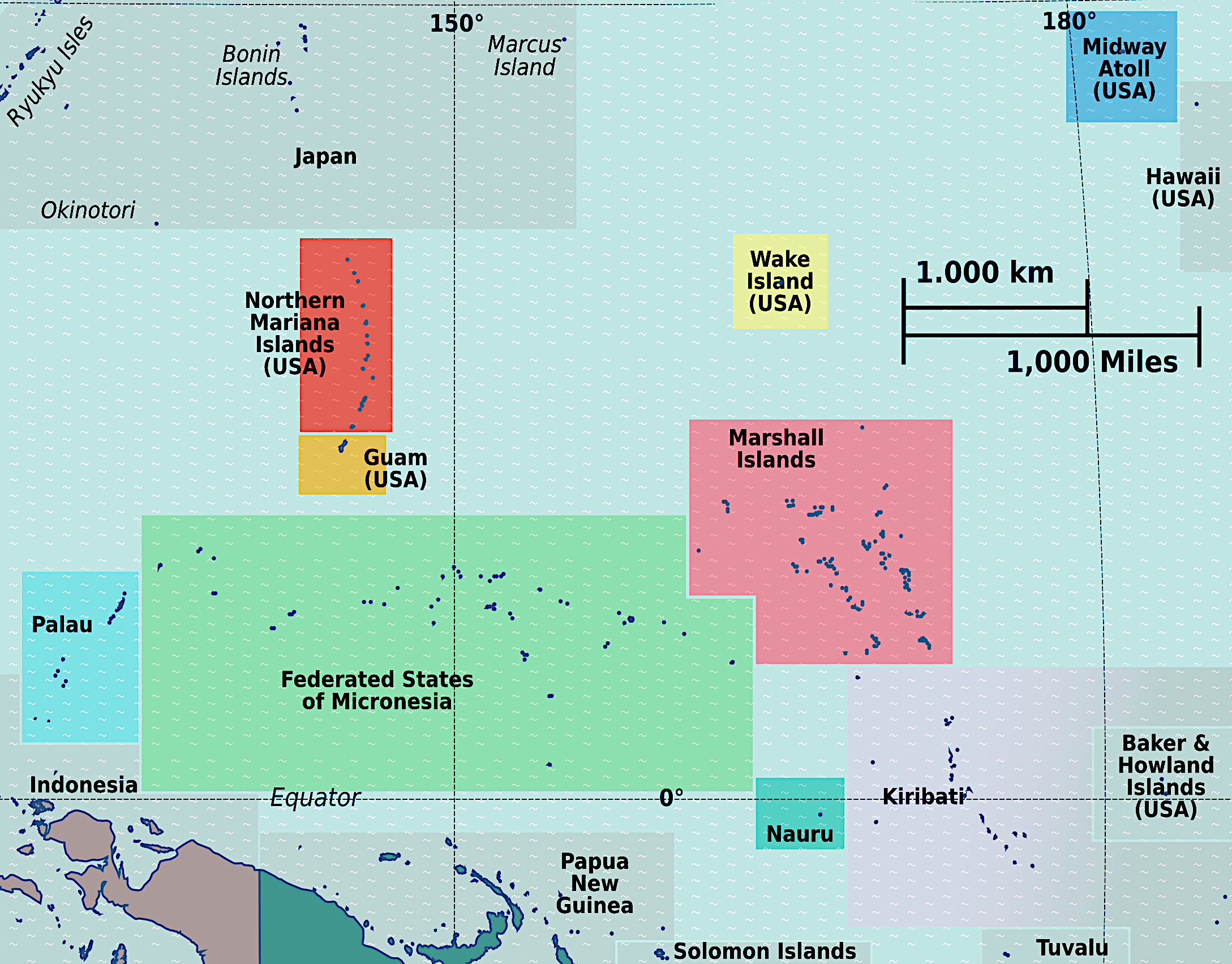
- Location within Kiribati Location within Micronesia Location within Oceania Location within Pacific Ocean

Geography
- Location: Pacific Ocean
- Coordinates: 0°37′S 174°22′E
- Archipelago: Gilbert Islands
- Area: 21.02 km^{2} (8.12 sq mi)
- Highest elevation: 3 m (10 ft)

Administration
- Kiribati
- Capital city: Matang

Demographics
- Population: 2,792 (2020 Census)
- Pop. density: 135/km^{2} (350/sq mi)
- Ethnic groups: I-Kiribati 99.7%

Nonouti is an atoll and district of Kiribati. The atoll is located in the Southern Gilbert Islands, 38 km north of Tabiteuea, and 250 km south of Tarawa. The atoll is the third largest in the Gilbert Islands and is the island where Catholicism was first introduced to Kiribati, in 1888.

== Geography ==
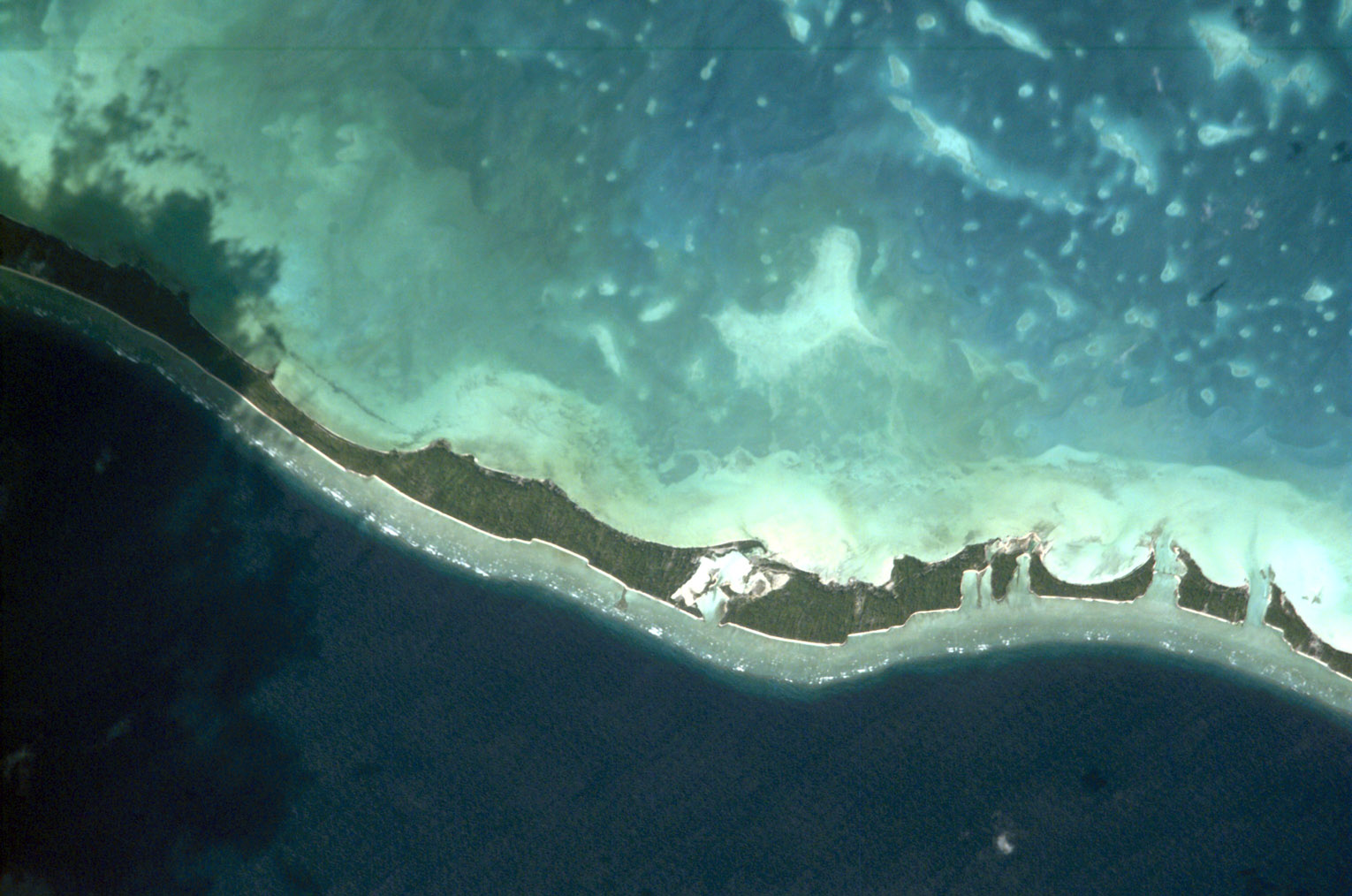
Nonouti Atoll

The eastern side of the atoll is the primary permanent landmass. There is an islet on the northwest side of the atoll called Noumatong, which is uninhabited and is reserved as a bird sanctuary. The eastern area of the atoll consists of tiny islets and islands which form a continuous line.

=== Villages ===
Taboiaki is the largest village of Nonouti with a population of 675 people (2020 Census). Matang village is the administrative centre and as such has better infrastructure and facilities; it is also the second largest village on Nonouti with 537 people, about a fifth of the total population. Benuaroa (a combined name for the islets of Mataboou and Tebuange) village held the least number of residents, with only 84 people or three percent of the total.

The government station on the island is located in the village of Matang. The island clerk is the highest ranking government official on the island. The former president, Ieremia Tabai, is from Nonouti.

Nonuti hosts seven primary schools and one Junior Secondary School, and is home to George Eastman High School, run privately by the Kiribati Protestant Church.

The land areas of Nonouti islets and the village populations are as follows:

Nonouti: Population and Land Area
Census Area	Population 2010	Land area by islet	Density (people per hectare)
Abamakoro	104	185 hectares (457 acres)	0.6
Benuaroa	84	108 hectares (267 acres)	0.8
Teuabu	269	150 hectares (371 acres)	1.9
Temanoku	286	562 hectares (1,389 acres)	0.9
Rotuma	405	562 hectares (1,389 acres)	0.9
Autukia	112	562 hectares (1,389 acres)	0.9
Matang	537	811 hectares (2,004 acres)	1.5
Taboiaki	692	811 hectares (2,004 acres)	1.5
Temotu	194	138 hectares (341 acres)	1.4
Nonouti total	2683	1,988 hectares (4,912 acres)	1.3

== History ==
The island was surveyed by the US Exploring Expedition in 1841.

In the late 19th century, Nonouti was briefly conquered by the king of Abemama, Tembinok'. The latter was driven out of Nonouti by a British warship.

The first Catholic missionaries were Tahiti-based Frenchmen, who arrived on the island of Nonouti, Gilbert Islands in the early 1880s and began translating texts and compiling dictionaries. The first priests in the Gilbert Islands, members of the Missionaries of the Sacred Heart, left France in 1888 and arrived on Nonouti on 10 May 1888. They arrived to find quite a large number of Gilbertese who were already exposed to the Gospel. Many of the Gilbertese natives had been taken by blackbirders in the 1870s to work on plantations on other islands in the Pacific, where they were met by Protestant missionaries. Two of these laborers, Betero and Tiroi, returned to Nonouti and instructed the local people about Christianity. They built churches, where people assembled each Sunday to sing hymns and recite prayers. At the time of the arrival of the Missionaries of the Sacred Heart, Betero and Tiroi had already baptized 560 people and were instructing an additional 600.

Close to where the first Catholic missionaries arrived in 1888, just behind the apse of the Catholic Church in Taboiaki village, are the six graves of important foreign missionaries and people to the Catholic Church. Opposite this Catholic Church is the biggest maneaba in Kiribati known as the Aake Maneaba.

Nonouti Post Office opened around 1923.

== Education ==
Currently there is one Christian senior high, George Eastman High School.
