= Autukia =

Settlement in Kiribati

Coordinates: 0°37′00″N 174°22′00″W

Autukia is a settlement in Kiribati, which had a population of 112 in the 2010 census. It is located on Nonouti atoll; to its north are Abamakoro, Benuaroa, Teuabu, Temanoku and Rotuma, while Matang (the administrative centre), Taboiaki (the largest village) and Temotu are to the south.
