= North Tarawa =

String of islets in Kiribati

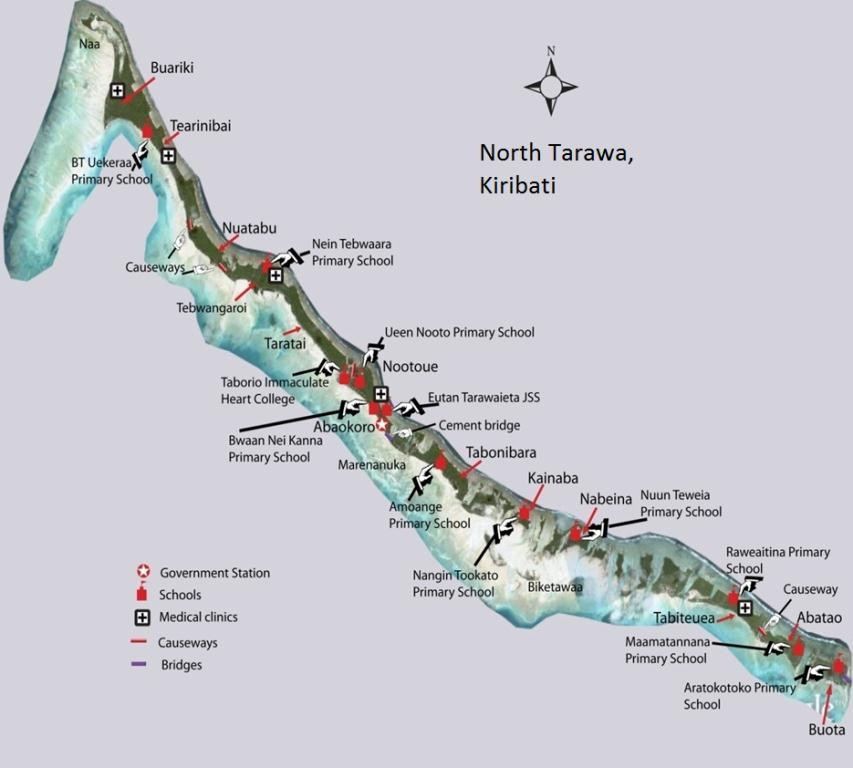
- Map of North Tarawa

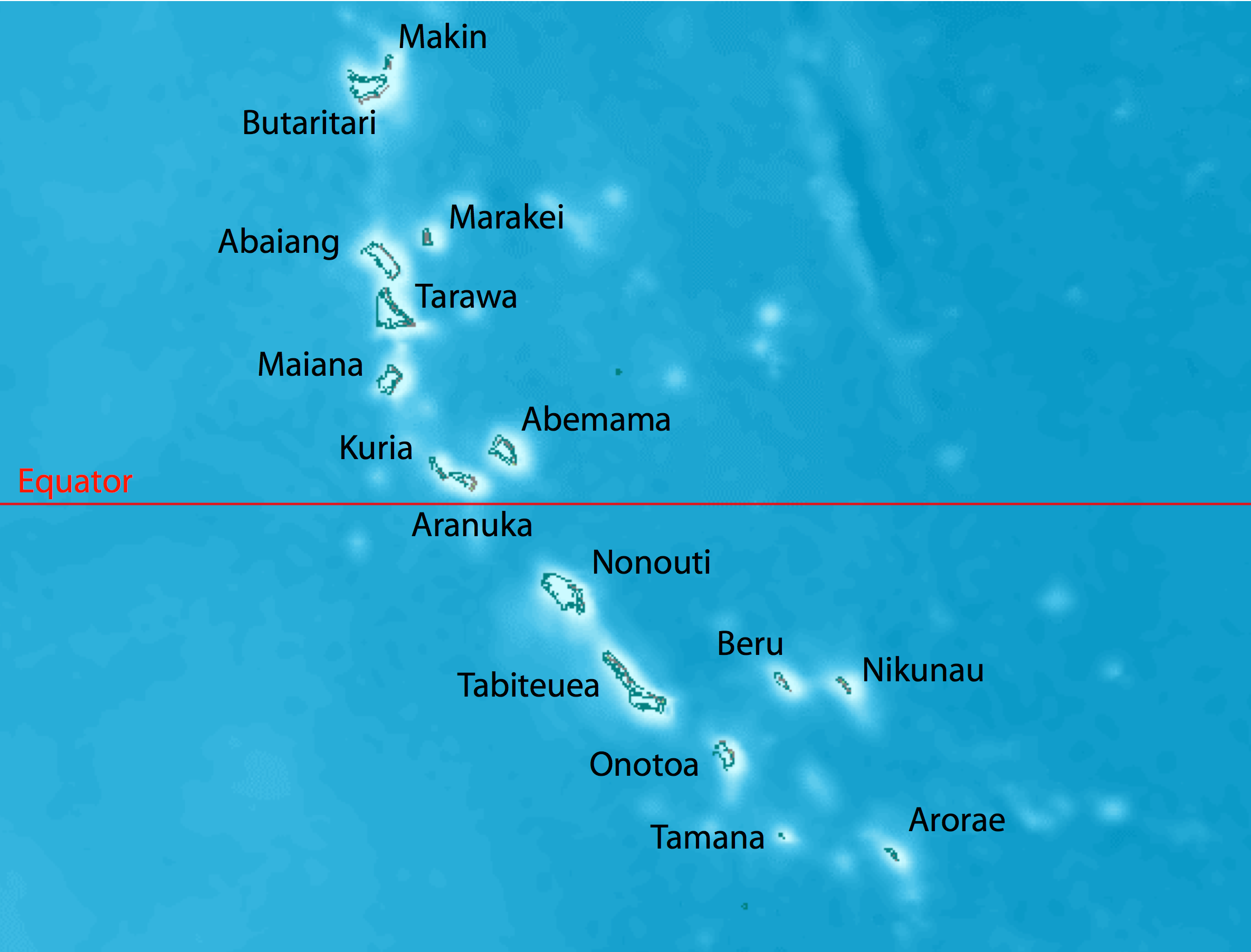

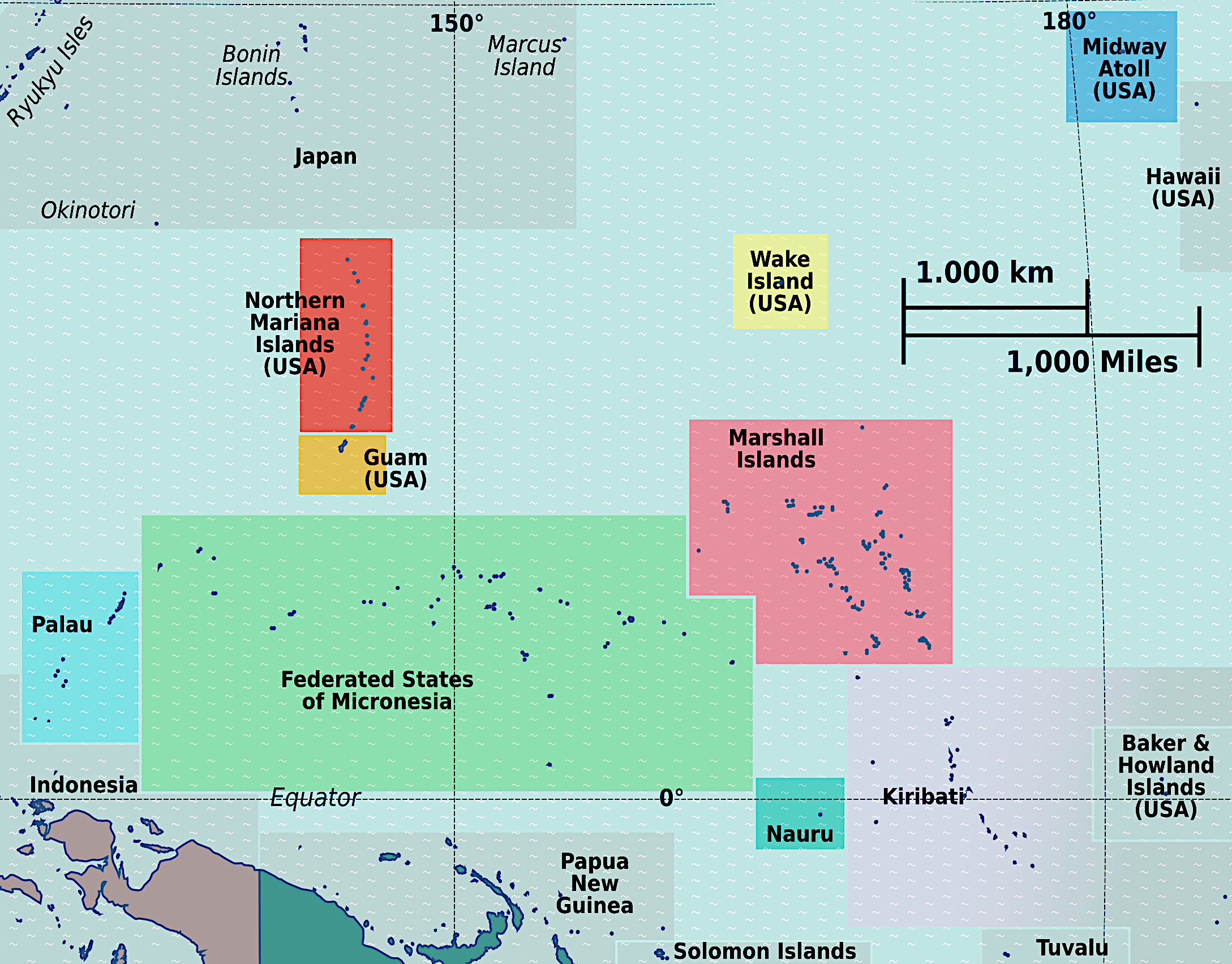
- Location within Kiribati Location within Micronesia Location within Oceania Location within Pacific Ocean

Geography
- Location: Pacific Ocean
- Coordinates: 1°26′N 173°00′E
- Archipelago: Gilbert Islands
- Area: 15.26 km^{2} (5.89 sq mi)
- Highest elevation: 3 m (10 ft)

Administration
- Kiribati

Demographics
- Population: 7,041 (2020 Census)
- Pop. density: 400/km^{2} (1000/sq mi)
- Ethnic groups: I-Kiribati 99.7%

Ramsar Wetland
- Official name: Nooto-North Tarawa
- Designated: 4 March 2013
- Reference no.: 2143

North Tarawa (Gilbertese: Tarawa Ieta) is the string of islets in the Republic of Kiribati, from Buariki at the northern tip of Tarawa atoll to Buota in the South, with a combined population of 6,629 as of 2015. It is administratively separate from neighbouring South Tarawa, and is governed by the Eutan Tarawa Council (ETC), based at Abaokoro.

== Geography ==
Map of South Tarawa (orange) and North Tarawa (green) within Tarawa Atoll

North Tarawa has a land area of 15.26 km^{2}. It is made up of several islets; the widest part of North Tarawa can be found in the village of Buariki and the narrowest width in the village of Tearinibai, next to Buariki.

Buota was joined by a bridge to South Tarawa in 1995 and has since increased in population and is becoming more like part of urban South Tarawa. Abatao is not accessible by road, but the channel can be easily walked at low tide and there is a boat service at high tide. For people in Abatao and Buota, it is much easier to access schools, clinics and other services on South Tarawa than to travel to the Government Station in Abaokoro. Apart from the bridge from Buota to Tanaea, small causeways connect the villages of Tebwangoroi and Taratai, Tebwangoroi and Nuatabu. The erosion and accretion that are occurring along the shoreline is identified as being linked to aggregate mining, land reclamation and the construction of causeways that has been thought to change the currents along the shoreline.

The atoll has a protected area that is designated as the Nooto-North Tarawa Conservation Area.

In the 1990s the uninhabited islands of Tebua Tarawa and Abanuea disappeared due to rising sea levels.

=== Villages ===
Abaokoro accommodates the main service infrastructures such as the offices of Eutan Tarawa Council, the junior secondary school and the main medical centre. With the rapid growth of population in South Tarawa, people are choosing to settle in North Tarawa in greater numbers, especially in Abatao and Buota, the two villages closest to South Tarawa.

There are 14 villages in North Tarawa. From North to South, the villages and their populations are:

North Tarawa: Places and population
Village	2000	2005	2010
Buariki	533	597	703
Tearinibai	221	317	297
Nuatabu	183	199	197
Tebwangaroi	34	34	40
Taratai	179	203	151
Nooto	699	845	814
Abaokoro	248	294	262
Marenanuka	70	71	101
Tabonibara	227	300	363
Kainaba	149	219	266
Nabeina	297	414	435
Tabiteuea	342	391	505
Abatao	379	421	499
Buota	916	1,373	1,469
North Tarawa total	4,477	5,678	6,102

== History ==
Tarawa was governed as one island, under a king, until Colonial times. The colonial administrative centre of Kiribati was originally located at Taratai in North Tarawa (where the last king used to live). The administrative centre was later moved to South Tarawa, which remains the capital of Kiribati to this day. The decision to locate the Government on South Tarawa led to many changes; the lifestyle on South Tarawa is now almost urban, while lifestyles on North Tarawa remain based in traditional, subsistence culture.

In the early 1970s, a boat constructed at Taratai village was sailed to Fiji using traditional navigation techniques, as part of a project led by James Siers to demonstrate that Pacific seafarers were capable of making deliberate voyages of exploration in ancient times.

== Economy ==
In North Tarawa, the subsistence lifestyle practiced throughout the Gilbert Islands coexists with a more market economy based on trade with neighboring South Tarawa. Only 16% of the workforce are in paid employment, but a further 17% earn cash from market oriented activities. There is a strong trade in local food, building materials and other items from North Tarawa, which are sold for cash in markets and on the streets of South Tarawa.

== Education ==
Aratokotoko Primary School is in North Tarawa. The Japanese government funded the construction of four classrooms there, spending $95,004.00 U.S. dollars (about $92,505.00 Australian dollars).

Education in Kiribati is free and compulsory for ages 6 to 13. Primary education includes the first seven years: classes one to six. The 110 government-funded primary schools throughout the islands enroll 17,594 students (approximately 49 percent female) and employ 727 teachers (approximately 62 percent female). In 1997, some 75 students were retained in a primary grade because of inadequate academic performance. Educational attainment in Kiribati is largely restricted to the primary level; this is principally the result of a lack of availability and cost of secondary and tertiary schools on the islands.

Currently there is one Christian senior high, Immaculate Heart College.

== Myths and legends ==
North Tarawa has a special place in Kiribati mythology; the tree of life or tree of knowledge or Uekera was planted in Buariki village in North Tarawa by Nei Tekanuea. Uekera came from the south. Spirits who lived in a tree in Samoa migrated northward carrying branches from the tree. It was these spirits, together with Nareau the Wise who created the islands of Tungaru (the Gilbert Islands) (Note: Sir Arthur Grimble, cadet administrative officer in the Gilberts from 1914 and resident commissioner of the Gilbert and Ellice Islands colony from 1926, recorded the myths and oral traditions of the Kiribati people. He wrote the best-sellers A Pattern of Islands (London, John Murray 1952, and Return to the Islands (1957), which was republished by Eland, London in 2011, ISBN 978-1-906011-45-1. He also wrote Tungaru Traditions: writings on the atoll culture of the Gilbert Islands, University of Hawaii Press, Honolulu, 1989, ISBN 0-8248-1217-4.)

== Visiting North Tarawa ==
=== Transport ===
There are regular ferry services from urban South Tarawa to the main villages of North Tarawa, and it is also relatively simple to charter a boat. The road from South Tarawa ends at the channel between Buota and Abatao, but this channel can be easily walked at low tide, so that the southern islets of North Tarawa can be accessed on foot.

=== Accommodation ===
The Island Council operates a guest house at Abaokoro, providing basic accommodation for Government workers and other visitors, but also welcoming tourists. There are also several independent homestays and lodges in North Tarawa.

=== Nooto-North Tarawa Conservation Area ===
Nooto-North Tarawa Conservation Area, 10.33 km^{2} (3.99 sq mi), is Ramsar Convention Site - Wetland of International Importance. This Conservation Area includes marine zones.
