= Tangkore =

Coordinates: 4°41′00″N 160°22′40″W

Tangkore, alternatively spelled Tengkore, is the capital village and largest settlement on the island of Teraina, Kiribati.
