= Uteute =

Coordinates: 4°41′00″N 160°22′40″W

Uteute is a settlement in Kiribati. It is located on the island of Teraina.
