= Kaaitara =

Kaaitara Tekaitara
- Place
- Interactive map of Kaaitara
- Coordinates: 4°41′00″N 160°22′40″WGeoNames
- Country: Kiribati
- Island: Teraina

Kaaitara (or Tekaitara) is a ghost town in Kiribati. The current population is 0. It is located on the island of Teraina.
