= Tabiauea =

Coordinates: 0°55′40″N 173°1′41″E

- Interactive map of Tabiauea
- Country: Kiribati
- Islands: Gilbert Islands
- Atoll: Maiana

Population
  - Total: 147

Tebiauea is a settlement in Kiribati. It is located on Maiana Atoll; the nearest location, about six nautical miles north, is Tebikerai. There are 147 residents of the village (2010 census).
