= Rungata =

Settlement on Nikunau Island in Kiribati

Coordinates: 1°21′S 176°26′E

Rungata, or Rungataa, is a settlement on Nikunau Island in Kiribati. It is the largest settlement on the island, with a population of almost 1,000, including residents of the adjacent Nikunau Island Council compound (or government station) and of the Nikunau Island Junior Secondary School. It is the port for the island, having a passage through the reef and a jetty. The nearest locations are Manriki to the south, and Tabutoa to the north, both of which are between one and two miles away.
