= Onauea =

Human settlement in Kiribati

- Location within Kiribati Location within North Pacific
- Country: Kiribati

Onauea is a settlement in Kiribati. It is located on the island of Teraina.
