= Tabutoa =

Coordinates: 1°20′S 176°26′E

Tabutoa is a settlement on Nikunau Island in Kiribati. The nearest locations, are Manriki and Rungata, to the south, and Muribenua, to the north all of these are between one and three miles away.
