= Kauamwemwe =

Coordinates: 4°41′00″N 160°22′40″W

- Settlement
- Interactive map of Kauamwemwe
- Country: Kiribati
- Island: Teraina

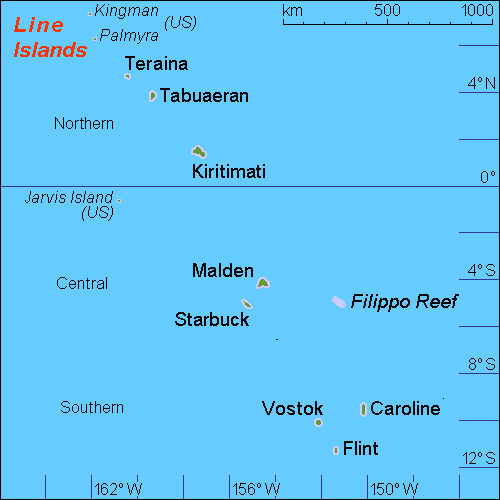
A map of the Kl Line Islands

Kauamwemwe is a settlement in Kiribati. It is located on the island of Teraina.
