= Aiaki =

- Location in Kiribati
- Country: Kiribati

Population
  - Total: 202

Aiaki is a village on Onotoa, atoll in Kiribati, with 202 residents as of the 2010 census. The nearest villages are Ewena and Otowae to the north; and Tabuarorae to the south. Apart from small breaks, the whole coastline from on the lagoon side is eroding as the result of wave action.
