= Taborio =

Coordinates: 1°30′N 173°01′E

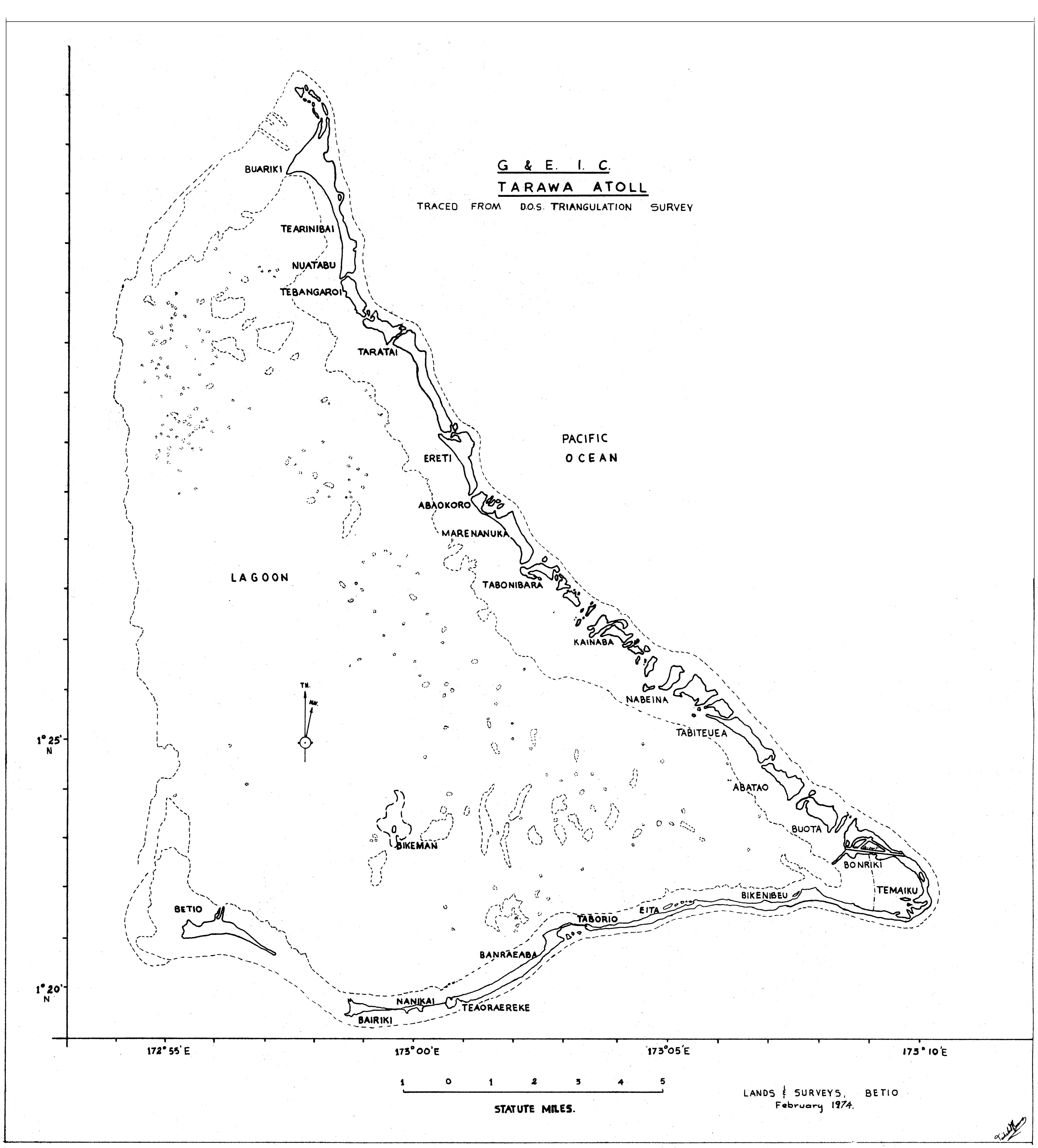
Map of the Tarawa atoll

Taborio is a settlement on the island of Tarawa, Kiribati, where the Immaculate Heart College, a Catholic school, is situated.

Taborio is situated on three and a half hectares of land surrounded by sea on all sides or reef-mud at low tide except where it is joined onto Nootoue village on its southern end.
