= Matanibike =

Human settlement in Kiribati

- Location within Kiribati Location within North Pacific
- Coordinates: 4°41′01″N 160°24′09″W
- Country: Kiribati

Matanibike is a settlement in Kiribati. It is located on the island of Teraina.
