= La Chomette =

- Commune
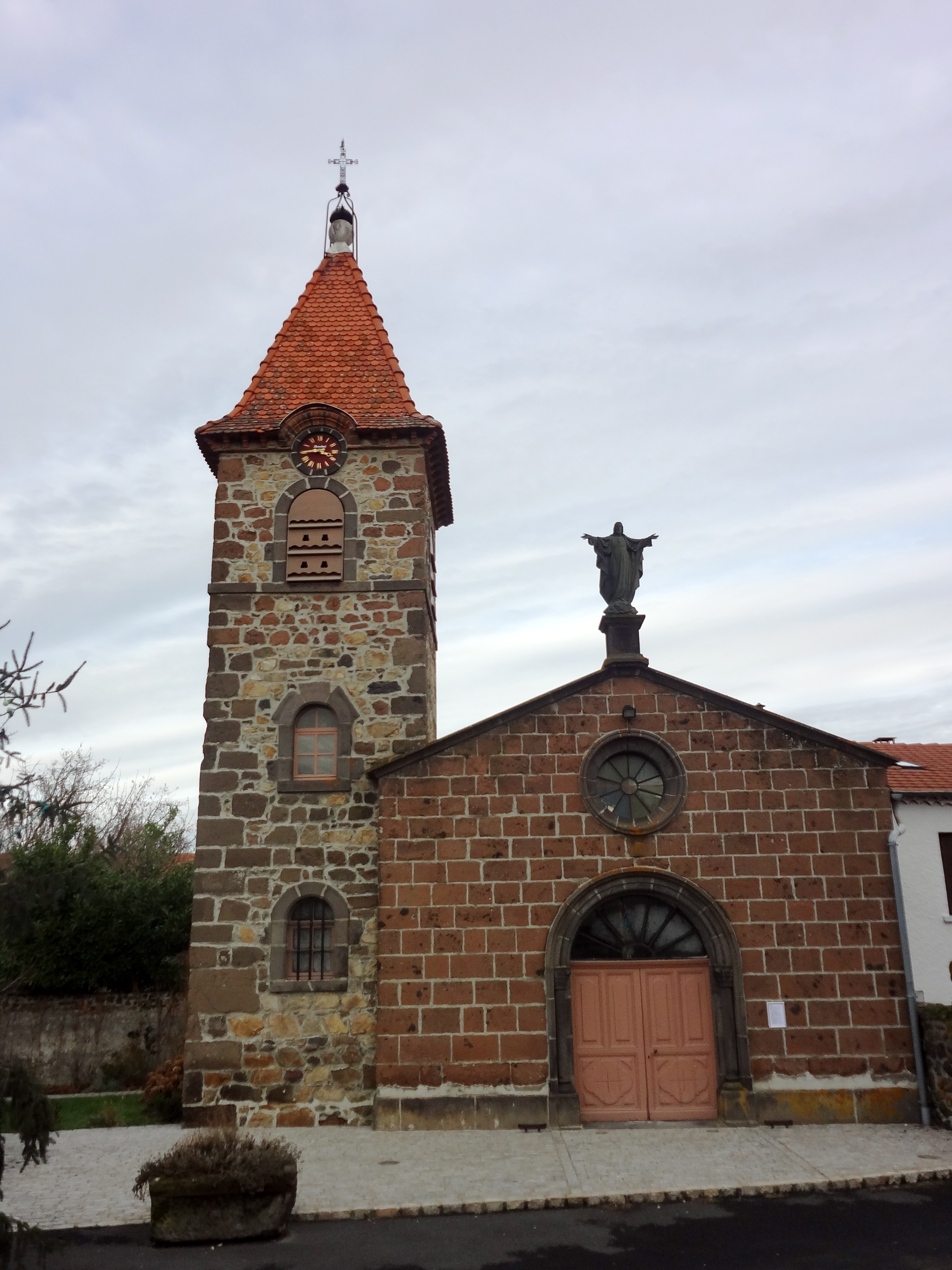
- Location of La Chomette
- Location within France Location within Auvergne-Rhône-Alpes
- Coordinates: 45°13′51″N 3°28′31″E
- Country: France
- Region: Auvergne-Rhône-Alpes
- Department: Haute-Loire
- Arrondissement: Brioude
- Canton: Pays de Lafayette

Government
  - Mayor (2020–2026): Marie-Andrée Perrey
- Area^{1}: 6.9 km^{2} (2.7 sq mi)
- Elevation: 652 m (2,139 ft)
- Highest elevation: 743 m (2,438 ft)
- Lowest elevation: 573 m (1,880 ft)
- Population (2023): 143
  - Density: 21/km^{2} (54/sq mi)
- Time zone: UTC+01:00 (CET)
  - Summer (DST): UTC+02:00 (CEST)
- INSEE/Postal code: 43072 /43230
- ^{1} French Land Register data, which excludes lakes, ponds, glaciers > 1 km^{2} (0.386 sq mi or 247 acres) and river estuaries.

La Chomette (French pronunciation: [la ʃɔmɛt]; Occitan: La Chaumeta) is a commune in the Haute-Loire department in south-central France.

== Population ==
Historical population
Year	Pop.	±% p.a.
1968	143	—
1975	147	+0.39%
1982	147	+0.00%
1990	128	−1.72%
1999	131	+0.26%
2007	137	+0.56%
2012	149	+1.69%
2017	154	+0.66%
2023	143	−1.23%
Source: INSEE

== See also ==
- Communes of the Haute-Loire department
