= Tebikerei =

Human settlement in Kiribati

Coordinates: 1°00′N 173°00′E

Tebikerai is a settlement in Kiribati. It is located on the atoll of Maiana, while the nearest settlement, about six nautical miles south, is Tebiauea.
