= Mwakeitari =

Human settlement in Kiribati

- Location within Kiribati Location within North Pacific
- Coordinates: 4°41′00″N 160°22′40″W
- Country: Kiribati
- Island: Teraina

Mwakeitari (also written Makeitari) is a settlement in Kiribati. It is located on the island of Teraina.
