= Takaeang =

Aranuka
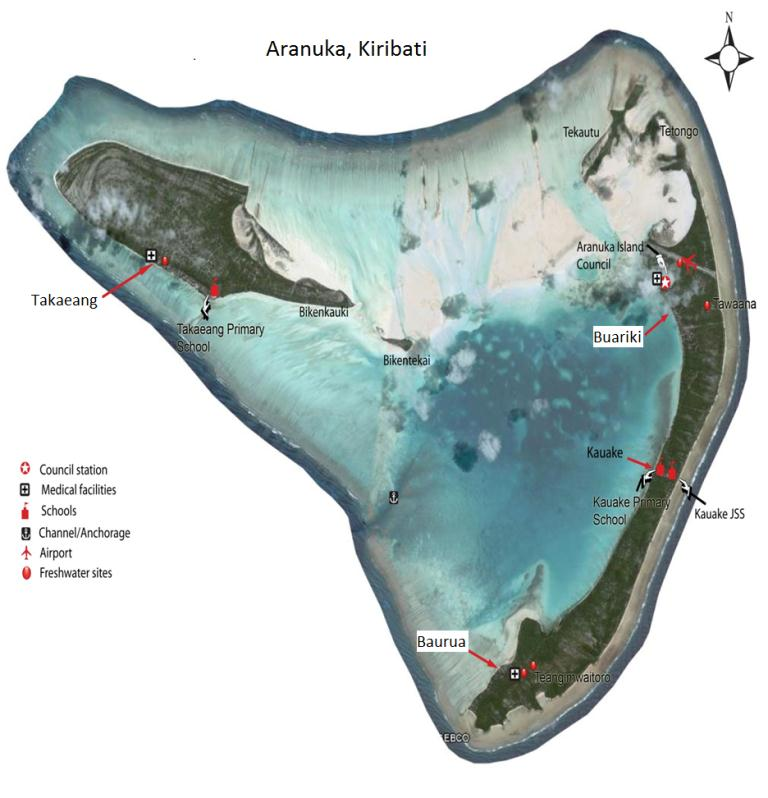
- Map of Aranuka

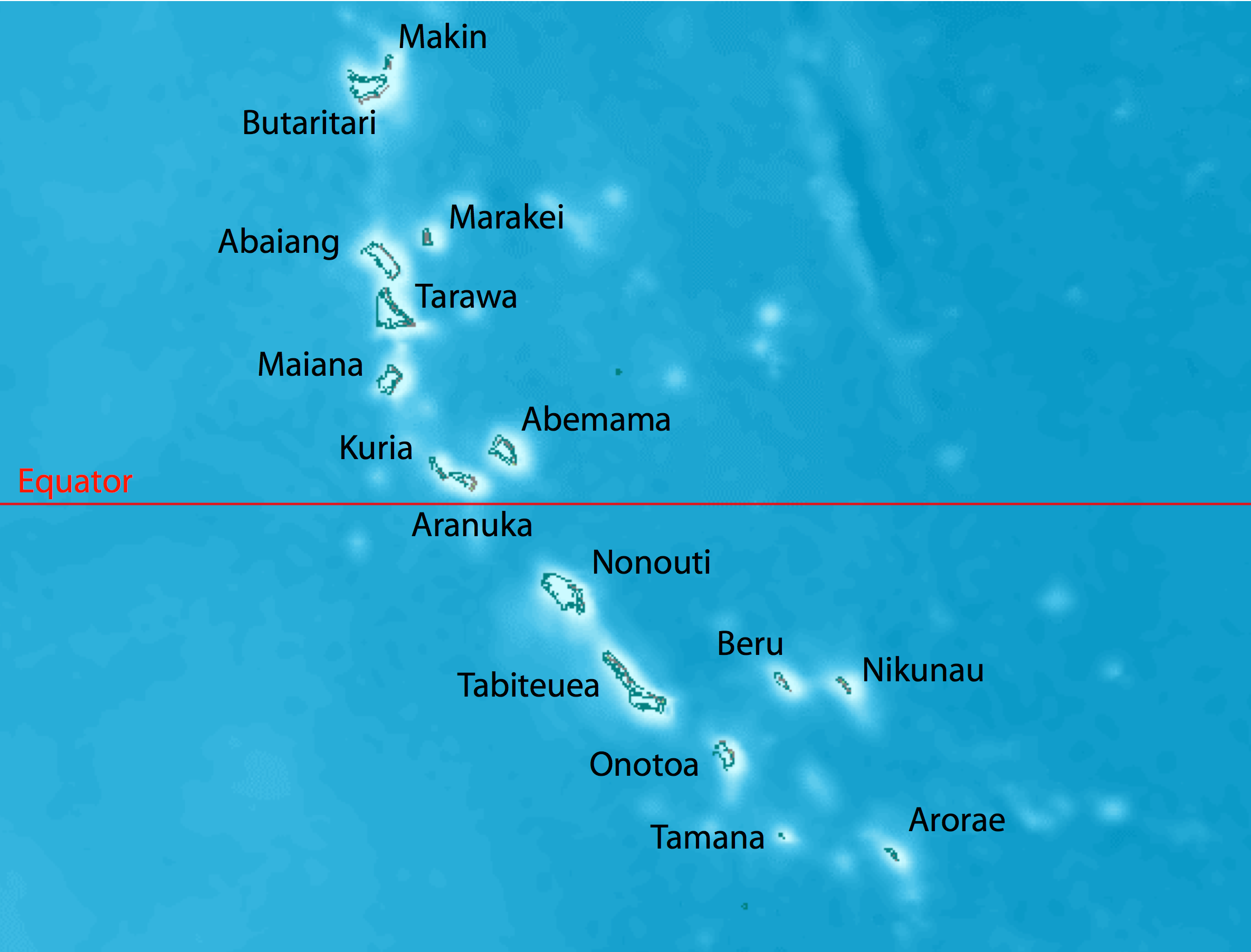

Geography
- Location: Pacific Ocean
- Coordinates: 0°09′N 173°35′E
- Archipelago: Gilbert Islands
- Area: 13.228 km^{2} (5.107 sq mi)
- Highest elevation: 3 m (10 ft)

Administration
- Kiribati
- Capital: Buariki

Demographics
- Population: 1,057 (2010 Census)
- Pop. density: 79.9/km^{2} (206.9/sq mi)
- Ethnic groups: I-Kiribati 99.6%

Takaeang is the second largest island in the Aranuka atoll of Kiribati. It helps form the triangular shape of the atoll by forming the top corner of the triangle. It is connected to the larger island, Buariki, by a sandbank.

The village is also called Takaeang.
