= Abaokoro =

Coordinates: 1°29′26″N 173°01′32″E

- Interactive map of Abaokoro
- Country: Kiribati

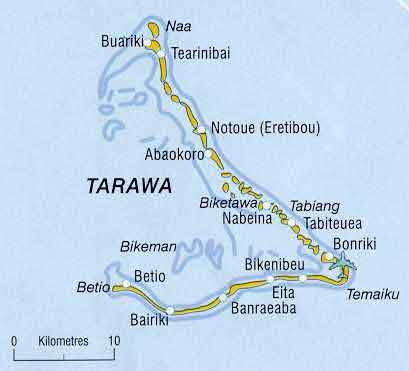
Map of the Tarawa atoll.

Abaokoro is a settlement in Kiribati. It is located about nine nautical miles from Tarawa. It is located in the Tarawa Atoll.

Abaokoro Post Office opened on 13 December 1956.
