= Taboiaki =

- Village
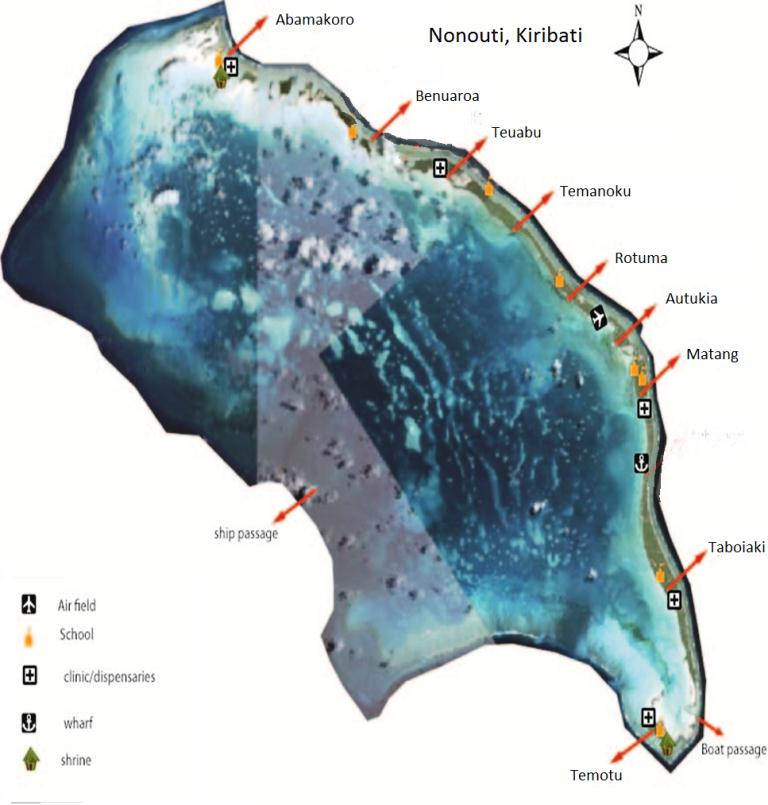
- Location of Taboiaki on Nonouti Atoll
- Country: Kiribati

Population (2010)
  - Total: 662

Taboiaki is a settlement in Kiribati. It is located on the atoll of Nonouti; It is the largest village with 662 residents in the 2010 census (26% of the population of Nonouti). Matang is the administrative centre with 536 residents (20% of the island's population in 2010).
