= Buariki (Aranuka) =

Aranuka
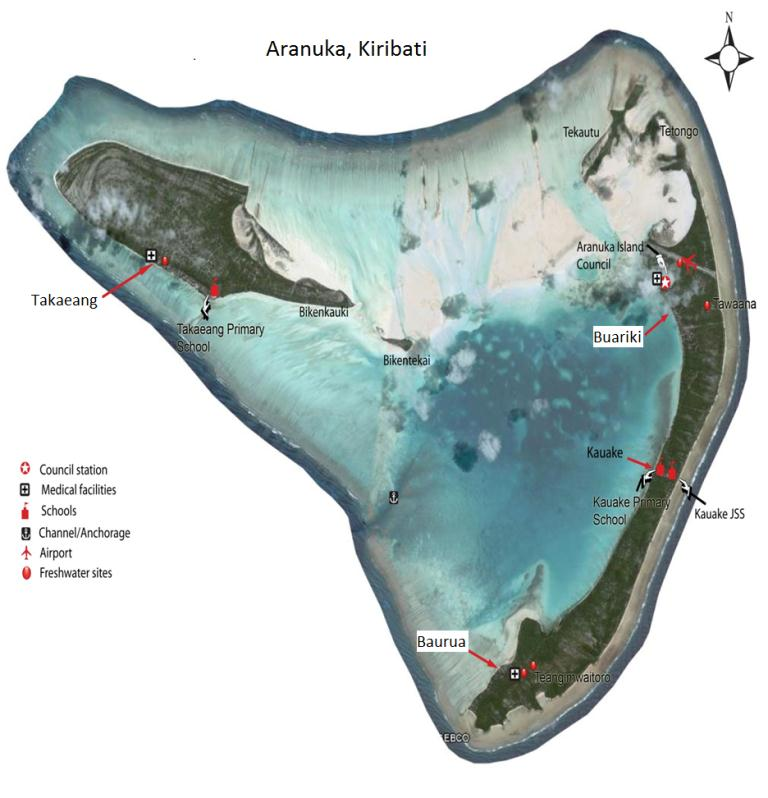
- Map of Aranuka

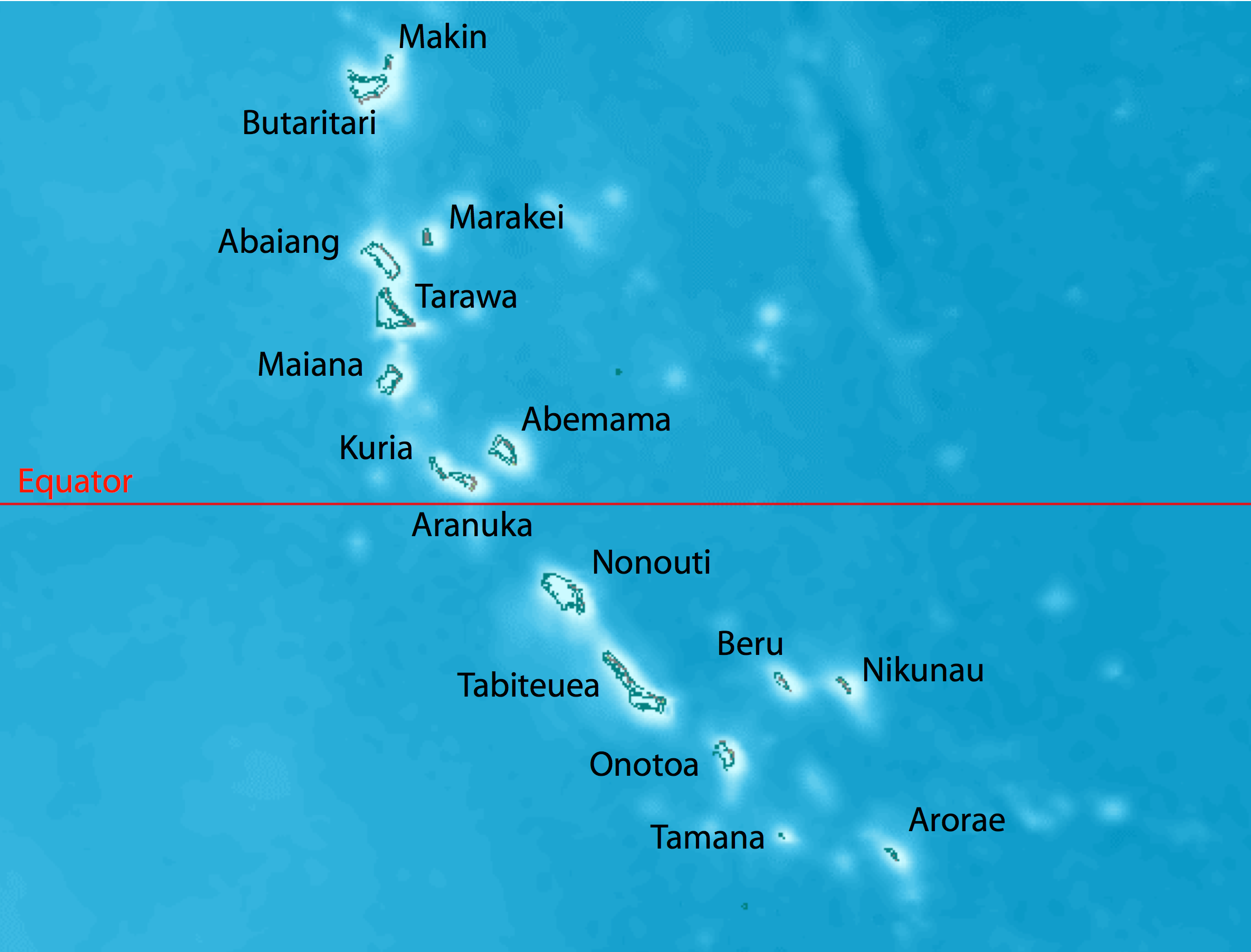

Geography
- Location: Pacific Ocean
- Coordinates: 0°09′N 173°35′E
- Archipelago: Gilbert Islands
- Area: 13.228 km^{2} (5.107 sq mi)
- Highest elevation: 3 m (10 ft)

Administration
- Kiribati
- Capital: Buariki

Demographics
- Population: 1,057 (2010 Census)
- Pop. density: 79.9/km^{2} (206.9/sq mi)
- Ethnic groups: I-Kiribati 99.6%

Buariki is the largest island in the Aranuka atoll of the Gilbert Islands in the Republic of Kiribati. Together with Takaeang the two large islands form the triangle shape of the atoll with Buariki forming the base.

== Villages ==
- Baurua
- Buariki

== Air transportation ==
Aranuka Airport is located about one kilometre north of Buariki village.

== See also ==
- Buariki (Tarawa)
