= Buariki (Tarawa) =

Coordinates: 1°36′45″N 172°57′40″E

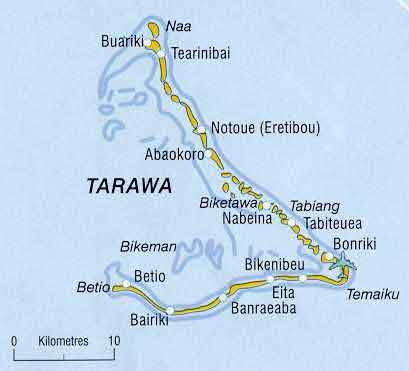
Map of the Tarawa atoll, with Buariki near the northern tip.

Buariki is an island in northern Tarawa Atoll in the Gilbert Islands of the Republic of Kiribati. It was the site of the Battle of Buariki in World War II.

The village on the island, also named Buariki, is the northernmost village of Tarawa atoll and is in the administrative area of North Tarawa.

== Geography ==
Buariki lies 31 km from Bairiki in South Tarawa and 60 km from the neighboring atoll of Marakei.

=== Climate ===
Buariki has a tropical rainforest climate (Af) with heavy rainfall year-round.

Climate data for Buariki
Month	Jan	Feb	Mar	Apr	May	Jun	Jul	Aug	Sep	Oct	Nov	Dec	Year
Mean daily maximum °C (°F)	30.6 (87.1)	30.5 (86.9)	30.4 (86.7)	30.6 (87.1)	30.8 (87.4)	30.6 (87.1)	30.6 (87.1)	30.6 (87.1)	30.8 (87.4)	31.0 (87.8)	31.0 (87.8)	30.8 (87.4)	30.7 (87.2)
Daily mean °C (°F)	28.0 (82.4)	27.9 (82.2)	27.8 (82.0)	27.9 (82.2)	28.2 (82.8)	28.0 (82.4)	28.0 (82.4)	27.9 (82.2)	28.0 (82.4)	28.2 (82.8)	28.2 (82.8)	28.1 (82.6)	28.0 (82.4)
Mean daily minimum °C (°F)	25.4 (77.7)	25.3 (77.5)	25.2 (77.4)	25.3 (77.5)	25.6 (78.1)	25.5 (77.9)	25.4 (77.7)	25.3 (77.5)	25.3 (77.5)	25.4 (77.7)	25.4 (77.7)	25.4 (77.7)	25.4 (77.7)
Average precipitation mm (inches)	258 (10.2)	186 (7.3)	236 (9.3)	189 (7.4)	161 (6.3)	151 (5.9)	175 (6.9)	136 (5.4)	104 (4.1)	112 (4.4)	152 (6.0)	222 (8.7)	2,082 (81.9)
Source: Climate-Data.org

== History ==
In World War II, the final battle of the Tarawa campaign occurred here on 26 November 1943, when the United States' 2nd Battalion 6th Marines fought the Battle of Buariki. The entire surviving Japanese force of 156, who had escaped Betio and were trapped at Buariki, fought to the death. The Marines had lost 34 men while 56 were wounded.

== See also ==
- Buariki (Aranuka)
