= Manriki, Kiribati =

Coordinates: 1°21′S 176°27′E

Manriki is a settlement on Nikunau Island in Kiribati. The nearest locations are Rungata and Tabutoa, to the north, and Nikumanu, to the south, both of which are between one and two miles away.
