= Tarawa =

Atoll and capital of Kiribati

- Map of South Tarawa and North Tarawa within Tarawa Atoll

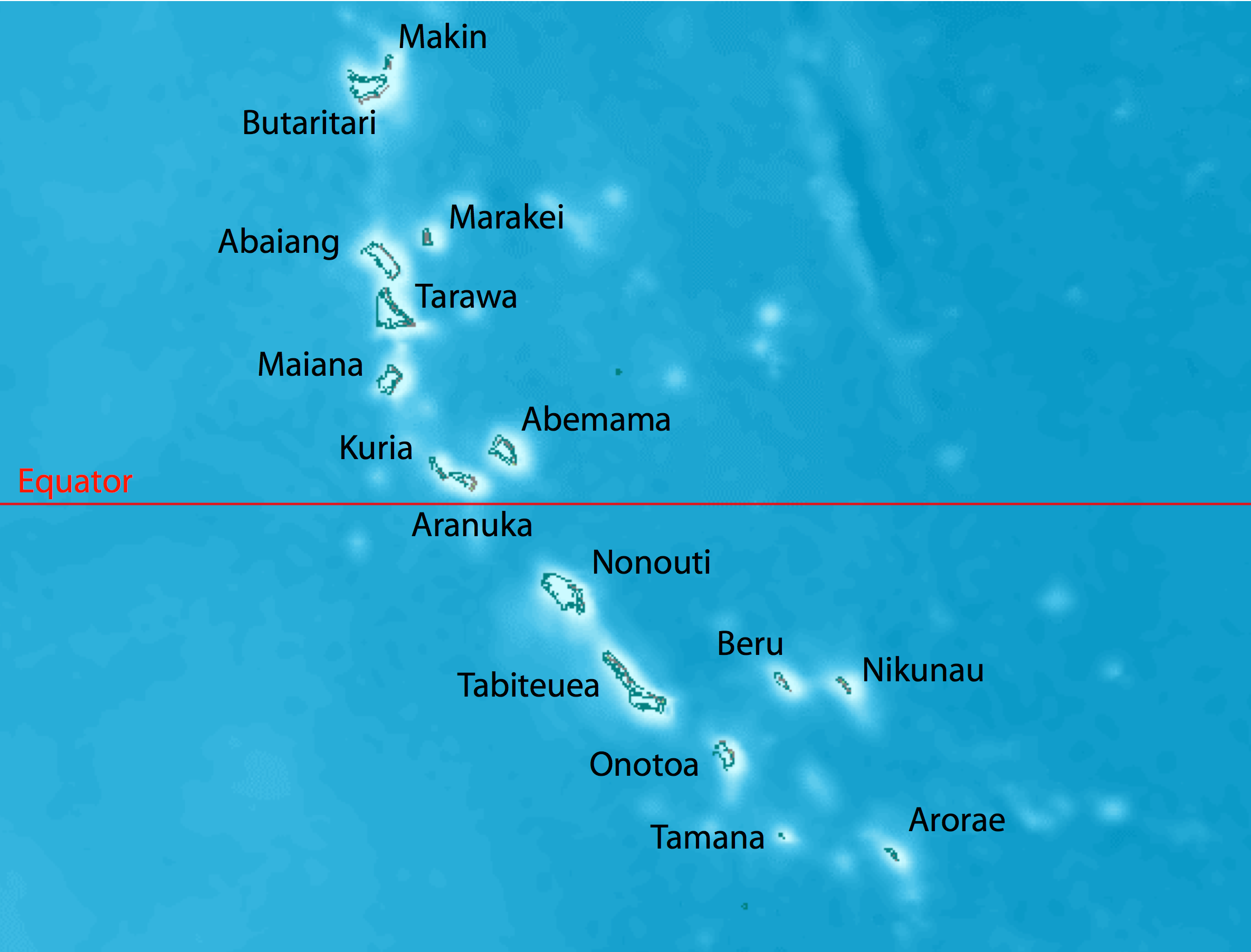
- Map of the Gilbert Islands

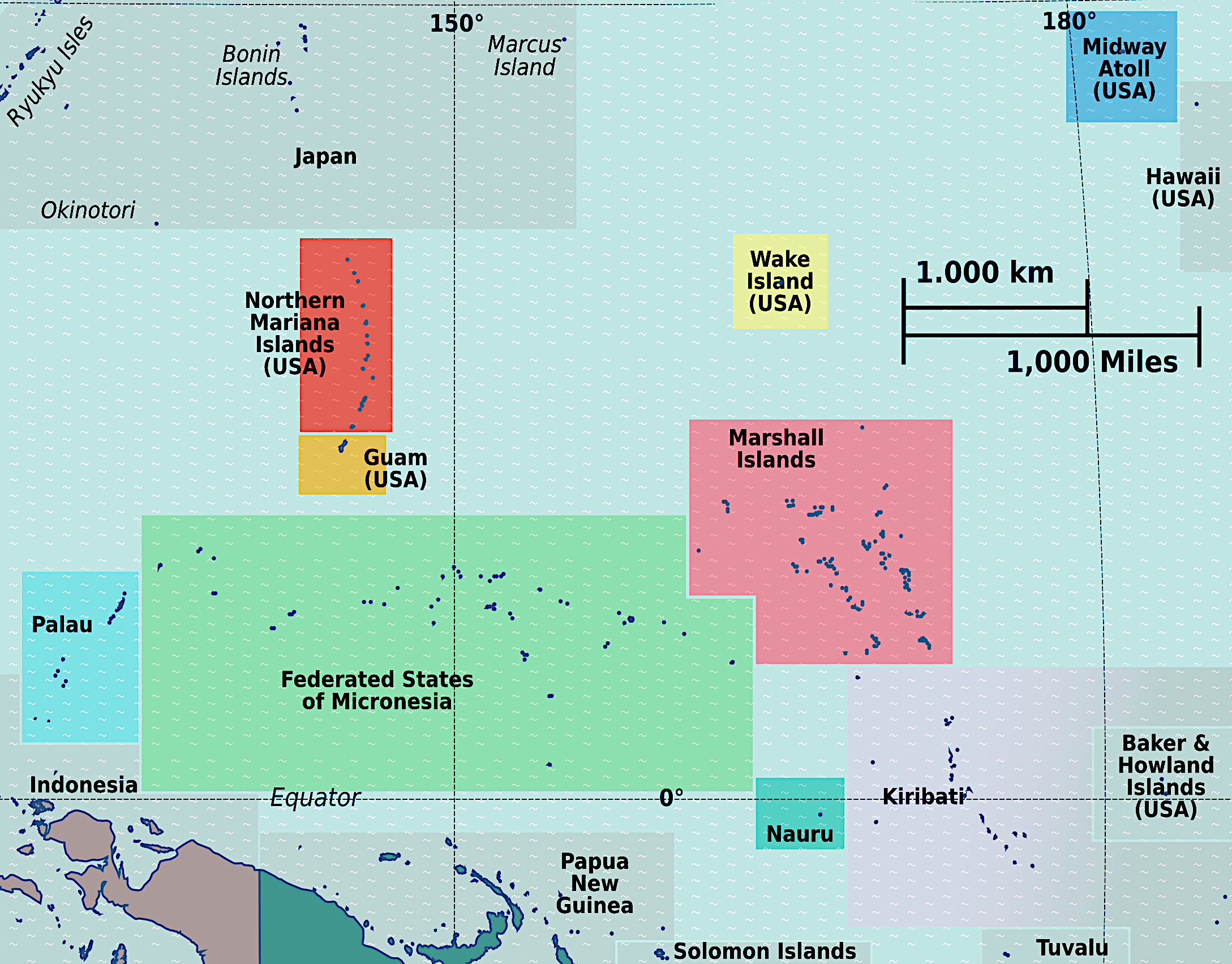
- Tarawa Tarawa (Micronesia) Tarawa (Oceania) Tarawa (Pacific Ocean)

Geography
- Location: Kiribati
- Coordinates: 1°20′N 173°00′E
- Archipelago: Gilbert Islands
- Area: 31.02 km^{2} (11.98 sq mi)
- Highest elevation: 3 m (10 ft)

Administration
- Kiribati
- Island councils: Betio, North Tarawa, South Tarawa
- Largest settlement: Betio

Demographics
- Population: 70,480 (2020)
- Pop. density: 2,031.5/km^{2} (5261.6/sq mi)
- Languages: Gilbertese
- Ethnic groups: I-Kiribati (95.5%)

Additional information
- Time zone: UTC+12:00

Tarawa is an atoll and the capital of the Republic of Kiribati, in the Micronesia region of the central Pacific Ocean. It comprises North Tarawa, which has 6,629 inhabitants and much in common with other more remote islands of the Gilbert group, and South Tarawa, which has 56,388 inhabitants as of 2015, half of the country's total population. The atoll was the site of the Battle of Tarawa during World War II.

== Etymology ==
Tarawa is an old Gilbertese form for Te Rawa, meaning "The Passage" (of the Lagoon), named for the unusual large ship channel to the lagoon. In the popular etymology based on Kiribati mythology, Nareau, the God-spider, distinguished Karawa, the sky, from Marawa, the Sea, from Tarawa, the land.

== Geography ==
Tarawa has a large lagoon, 500 square kilometres (193 square miles) in total area, and a wide reef. The lagoon is widely open to the ocean, with a large ship pass. Although naturally abundant in fish and shellfish of all kinds, marine resources are being strained by the large and growing population. Drought is frequent, but in normal years rainfall is sufficient to maintain breadfruit, papaya and banana trees as well as coconut and pandanus.

North Tarawa consists of a string of islets from Buariki in the north to Buota in the south. The islets are separated in places by wide channels that are best crossed at low tide, and there is a ferry service between Buota and Abatao. Only Buota is connected by road to South Tarawa, via a bridge.

On South Tarawa, the construction of causeways has now created a single strip of land from Betio in the west to Tanaea in the northeast. Previously, Betio, the site of the battle of Tarawa, was only 291 acres in size.

=== Climate ===
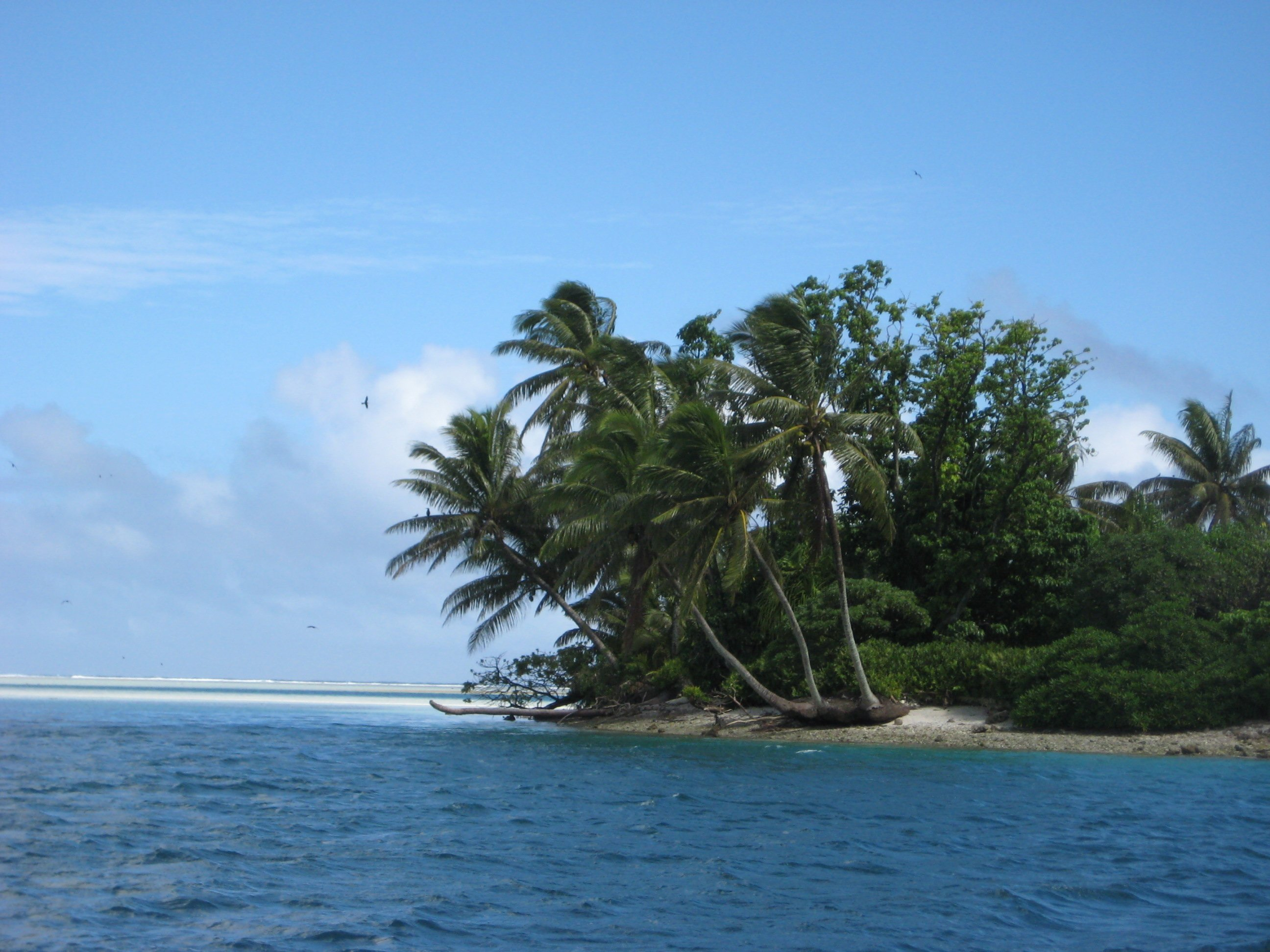
A tropical islet with palm fronds oriented in the direction of the prevailing winds.

Tarawa features a tropical rainforest climate under the Köppen climate classification. The climate is pleasant from April to October, with predominant northeastern winds and stable temperatures close to 30 °C (86 °F). From November to March, western gales bring rain and occasional cyclones.

Precipitation varies significantly between islands. For example, the annual average is 3,000 mm (120 in) in the north and 500 mm (20 in) in the south of the Gilbert Islands. Most of these islands are in the dry belt of the equatorial oceanic climatic zone and experience prolonged droughts.

Climate data for Tarawa Airport (South Tarawa)
Month	Jan	Feb	Mar	Apr	May	Jun	Jul	Aug	Sep	Oct	Nov	Dec	Year
Record high °C (°F)	35.0 (95.0)	33.0 (91.4)	35.0 (95.0)	34.5 (94.1)	34.5 (94.1)	33.5 (92.3)	34.5 (94.1)	34.5 (94.1)	34.5 (94.1)	35.0 (95.0)	35.0 (95.0)	35.0 (95.0)	35.0 (95.0)
Mean daily maximum °C (°F)	30.7 (87.3)	30.6 (87.1)	30.7 (87.3)	30.7 (87.3)	30.8 (87.4)	30.8 (87.4)	30.9 (87.6)	31.0 (87.8)	31.1 (88.0)	31.2 (88.2)	31.3 (88.3)	30.9 (87.6)	30.9 (87.6)
Daily mean °C (°F)	28.2 (82.8)	28.1 (82.6)	28.1 (82.6)	28.2 (82.8)	28.4 (83.1)	28.3 (82.9)	28.2 (82.8)	28.3 (82.9)	28.4 (83.1)	28.6 (83.5)	28.5 (83.3)	28.2 (82.8)	28.3 (82.9)
Mean daily minimum °C (°F)	25.3 (77.5)	25.3 (77.5)	25.2 (77.4)	25.3 (77.5)	25.5 (77.9)	25.3 (77.5)	25.1 (77.2)	25.2 (77.4)	25.3 (77.5)	25.4 (77.7)	25.4 (77.7)	25.3 (77.5)	25.3 (77.5)
Record low °C (°F)	21.5 (70.7)	22.5 (72.5)	22.5 (72.5)	22.5 (72.5)	21.0 (69.8)	21.0 (69.8)	21.0 (69.8)	21.5 (70.7)	22.5 (72.5)	22.0 (71.6)	22.5 (72.5)	22.0 (71.6)	21.0 (69.8)
Average precipitation mm (inches)	271 (10.7)	218 (8.6)	204 (8.0)	184 (7.2)	158 (6.2)	155 (6.1)	168 (6.6)	138 (5.4)	120 (4.7)	110 (4.3)	115 (4.5)	212 (8.3)	2,052 (80.8)
Average precipitation days (≥ 0.3 mm)	15	12	14	15	15	14	16	18	15	11	10	17	172
Average relative humidity (%)	81	80	81	82	81	81	80	79	77	77	79	81	80
Mean monthly sunshine hours	220.1	192.1	207.7	201.0	229.4	219.0	229.4	257.3	243.0	260.4	240.0	189.1	2,688.5
Mean daily sunshine hours	7.1	6.8	6.7	6.7	7.4	7.3	7.4	8.3	8.1	8.4	8.0	6.1	7.4
Source: Deutscher Wetterdienst

== Administration ==
Tarawa atoll has three administrative subdivisions: Betio Town Council (or BTC), on Betio Islet; Teinainano Urban Council (or TUC), from Bairiki to Tanaea; and Eutan Tarawa Council (or ETC), for North Tarawa or Tarawa Ieta, consisting of all the islets on the east side from Buota northwards. The meaning of Te inainano in Gilbertese language is "down of the mast", alluding to the sail-shape of the atoll.

South Tarawa hosts the capital of the Republic of Kiribati and was also the central headquarters of the Gilbert and Ellice Islands since 1895. The House of Assembly is in Ambo, and the State House is in Bairiki. The offices of the various ministries of the government range from Betio at the south-west extreme to Nawerewere (on an easterly island in its chain), close to Bonriki (International Airport) and Temwaiku. Settlements on North Tarawa include Buariki, Abaokoro, Marenanuka and Taborio.

=== Diplomatic missions ===
Four resident diplomatic missions exist: the embassies of China (closed in 2003, re-opened in 2020) and Japan (opened in 2023), and the high commissions of Australia and New Zealand. The United Nations are also present in Kiribati, including UNICEF, UNDP, UNFPA, UNOPS, UN Women, WHO and FAO.

== History ==
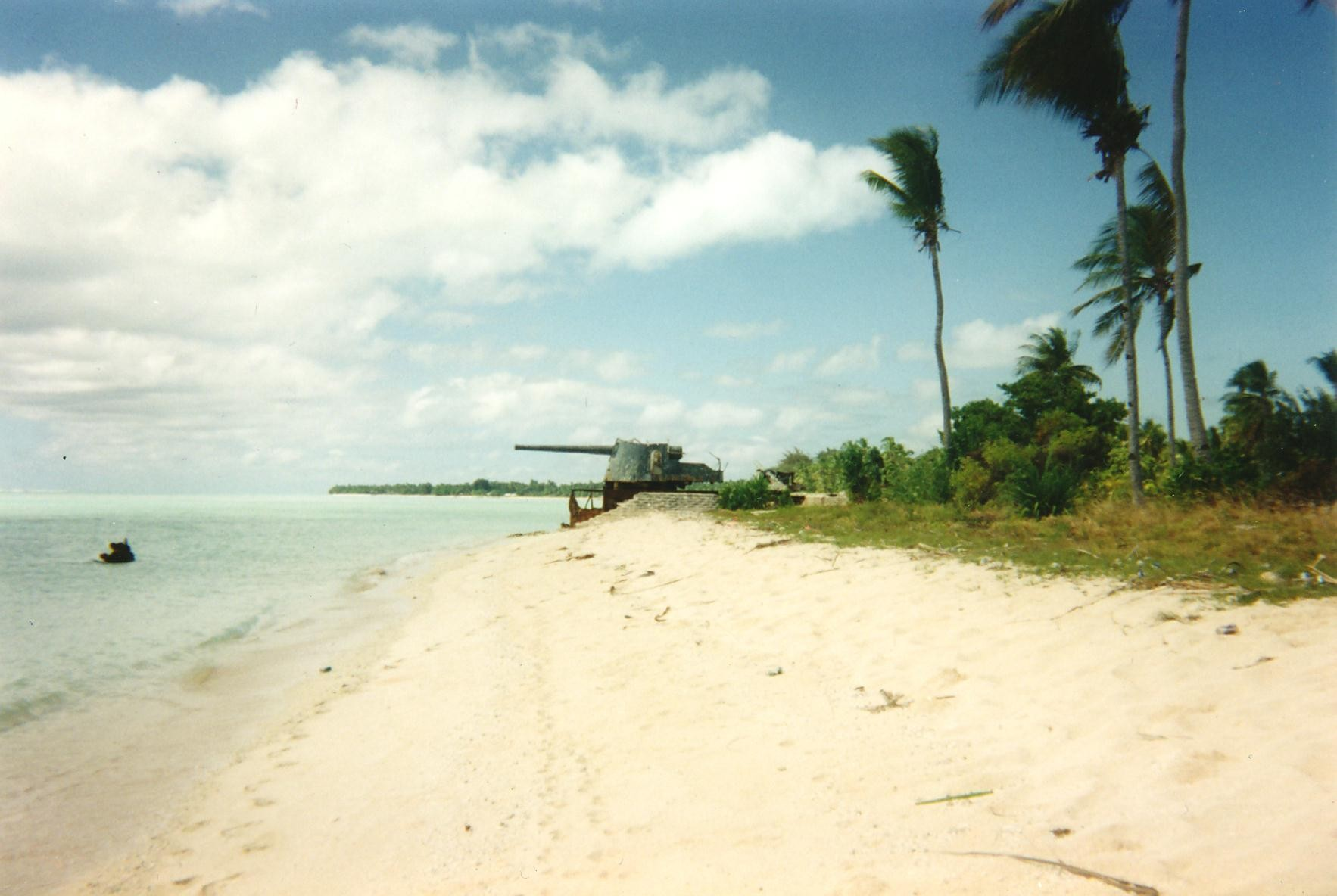
Japanese World War II defences on Tarawa

In Kiribati mythology, Tarawa represents the primordial earth, existing before Nareau the spider separated the land, ocean, and sky. After naming the sky "karawa" and the ocean "marawa," Nareau referred to the rock upon which Riiki—another deity discovered by Nareau—stood when he raised the sky as "Tarawa." Following this, Nareau went on to create the remaining islands of Kiribati, as well as Samoa.

Gilbertese first settled these islands thousands of years ago, and there have been migrations to and from Gilbert Islands since antiquity.

Evidence from a range of sources, including carbon dating and DNA analyses, confirms that the exploration of the Pacific included settlement of the Gilbert Islands by around 200 BC. The people of Tungaru (native name of the Gilbertese) are still excellent seafarers, capable of making ocean crossings in locally made vessels using traditional navigation techniques.

Thomas Gilbert, captain of the East India Company vessel Charlotte, was the first European to describe Tarawa, arriving on 20 June 1788. He did not land. He named it Matthew Island, after the owner of his ship Charlotte. He named the lagoon Charlotte Bay. Gilbert's 1788 sketches survive.

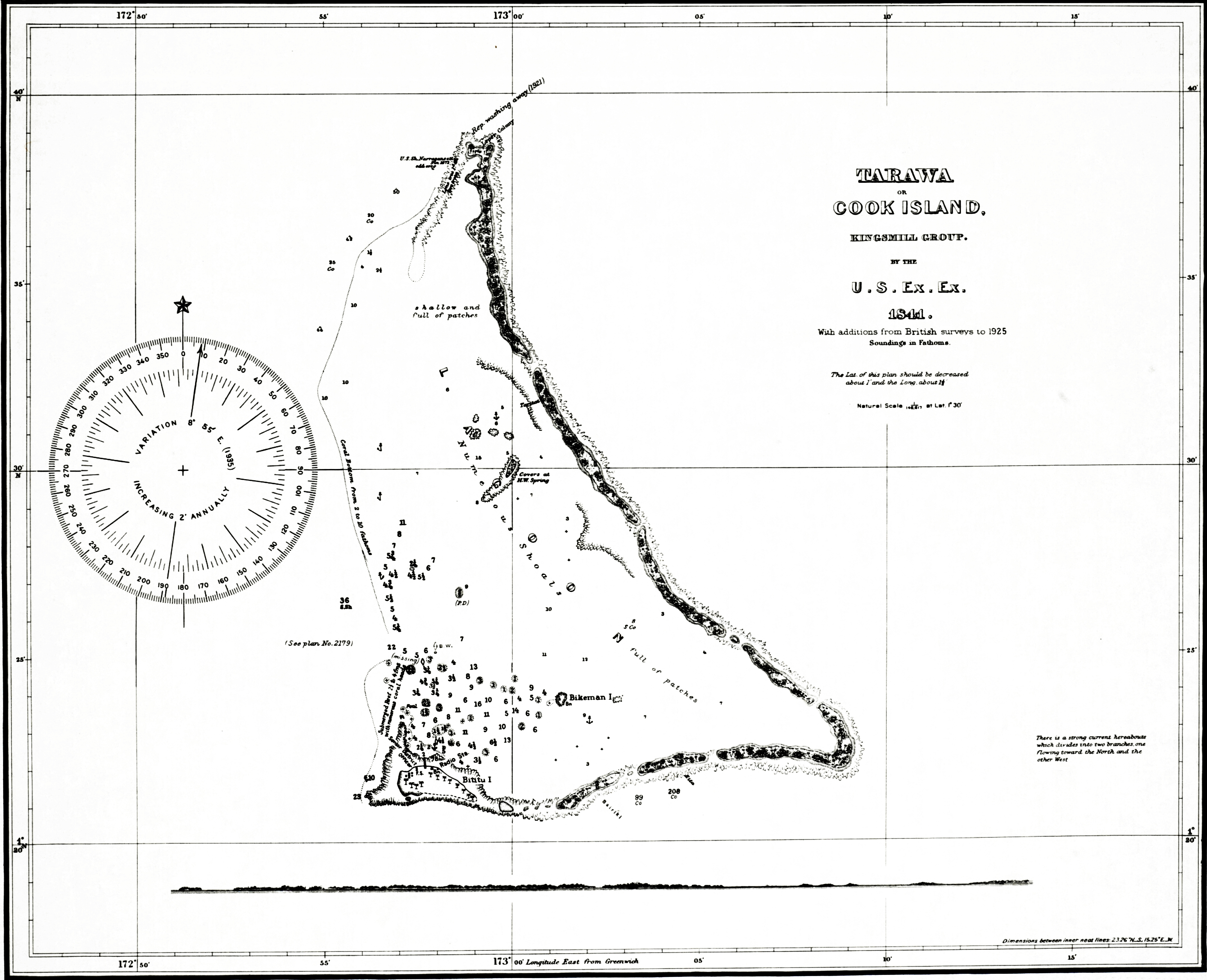
Map of Tarawa, from US Ex Ex survey in 1873

In 1841, the island was mapped by the US Exploring Expedition.

For nine generations, the island was divided between two warring factions, the House of Auatubu and the House of Teabike, until in 1892 HMS Royalist arrived, with Captain Edward Davis proclaiming that the island was now a British Protectorate. This saved Auatubu from massacre; the day before, they had been badly defeated by Teabike. A very old lady, plaiting a sleeping mat twenty-five years later, described the situation:

"In those days death was on the right hand and on the left. If we wandered north, we were killed or raped. If we wandered south, we were killed or raped. If we returned alive from walking abroad, our husbands themselves killed us, for they said that we had gone forth seeking to be raped. That was indeed just, for a woman who disobeys her husband is a woman of no account, and it matters not how she dies. Yet how beautiful is life in our villages, now that there is no killing and war is no more... Behold my son and my grandson! These would have died with me that day at Nea if the warship had not arrived. And these"—she pointed out her great and great-great-grandchildren—"would never have been born. We live because the Government of Kuini Kabitoria brought peace to us, and here I sit plaiting this mat to be buried in because of the kindness of that woman, with all my generations around me to wrap me in it when I die."

The aftermath of land claims and counter-claims between Auatubu and Teabike nevertheless caused high tension for years afterwards.

Charles Richard Swayne, the first Resident Commissioner, decided to install the central headquarters of the Gilbert and Ellice Islands protectorate in Tarawa in 1895. Tarawa Post Office opened on 1 January 1911.

Sir Arthur Grimble was a cadet administrative officer based at Tarawa (1913–1919). He became Resident Commissioner of the Gilbert and Ellice Islands colony in 1926.

With the Marines at Tarawa documentary film, 1944 (0:20:10)

During World War II, Tarawa was occupied by the Japanese, and beginning on 20 November 1943 it was the scene of the bloody Battle of Tarawa. On that day U.S. Marines landed on Tarawa and fought Japanese Marines of the Special Naval Landing Forces occupying entrenched positions on the atoll. The Marines captured the island after 76 hours of intense fighting that killed 6,000 people in total.

The fierce fighting was the subject of a documentary film produced by the Combat Photographers of the Second Marine Division entitled With the Marines at Tarawa. It was released in March 1944 at the insistence of President Roosevelt. It became the first time many Americans viewed American servicemen dead on film. The US built bases on the Island.

The Kiribati Government began a road restoration project funded in part by the World Bank in 2014 to re-surface the main road from Betio in the west to Bonriki in the east, upgrading the main road that transits Tarawa from a dirt road.

== Literature ==
- A Pattern of Islands by Sir Arthur Grimble, John Murray & Co, London, 1952; republished 2011 by Eland, London, ISBN 978-1-906011-45-1
- Return to the Islands, a sequel by Sir Arthur Grimble, John Murray & Co, London, 1957
- The 2004 book The Sex Lives of Cannibals by J. Maarten Troost is a lighthearted account of the author's two years living on Tarawa.
- The Precedence of Tarawa Atoll, by H.E. Maude and Edwin Doran Jr, Annals of the Association of American Geographers, Vol. 56, No. 2 (Jun. 1966), pp. 269–289.
- Kiribati. Cronache illustrate da una terra (s)perduta is an illustrated book of Alice Piciocchi (illustrator: Andrea Angeli). March 2016. 24 Ore Cultura, Milan, also in French translation Chronique illustrée d’un archipel perdu, éditions du Rouergue, 2018.
- Tarawa, by war correspondent Robert Sherrod. was published in 1944 and chronicles the WWII battle

== In popular culture ==
- Tarawa is the site of the 1944 Pulitzer Prize-winning photograph by Frank Filan, depicting a destroyed bunker.
- Leon Cooper, a US Navy landing craft operator who took part in the WWII battle, returned to the island in 2008 to investigate reports the beach he landed on was littered with garbage. His journey was chronicled in the documentary "Return to Tarawa: The Leon Cooper Story", narrated by Ed Harris.
- "Tarawa Atoll Sanglant" is a Belgian comic written by Jean-Michel Charlier and Victor Hubinon in 1950. (ISBN 2-8001-2063-0)
- Leon Uris's 1953 fictional Battle Cry extensively depicts the 1943 battle. (Uris was a Marine on Guadalcanal.)
- Tarawa Atoll is featured as the penultimate battle of EA Games Medal of Honor: Pacific Assault (2004).
- A 1956 British drama film Pacific Destiny based on the book A Pattern of Islands was made in 1956.
- The Far Reaches, a 2007 historical novel by Homer Hickam, describes the Battle of Tarawa. (ISBN 0-312-334753)
- In the novel Snow Falling on Cedars, Ishmael Chambers is a World War II US Marine Corps veteran who lost an arm fighting the Japanese at the Battle of Tarawa while watching his friends die. He revisits his part in the battle in a flashback.
- The Sex Lives of Cannibals: Adrift in the Equatorial Pacific is a 2004 travelogue by author J. Maarten Troost describing the two years he and his girlfriend spent living on Tarawa atoll in the Pacific island nation of Kiribati.

=== Memorial ===
- USS Tarawa was the name of the first LHA-class amphibious assault ship.

== See also ==
- Tarawa Climate Change Conference
