= Erika Taeang =

I-Kiribati artist and teacher

Erika Taeang is an artist and teacher from Kiribati. In 2020 Finlayson Park School in Auckland became the first school in New Zealand to set up a Kiribati language unit, where Taeang was employed as the teacher. Twenty students were initially enrolled. Also a textile artist and weaver, a tibuta (traditional shirt) made by Taeang is in the collection of the Tropenmuseum, within the Nationaal Museum van Wereldculturen. Her woven mats are made from fibre from Kiribati, which is sent to New Zealand, and are decorated with bird motifs.
