= Ernest Sabatier =

French historian, poet and missionary (1886–1965)

Ernest Sabatier (24 May 1886 – 13 February 1965) was a French historian, poet and a Catholic missionary from the Mission of the Sacred Heart of Jesus in Oceania. He studied theology at University of Fribourg.

Sabatier is known for studying the Gilbertese language in the former Gilbert Islands (now Kiribati). He arrived the Gilbert Islands in 1913.

He won the Archon-Despérouses Prize for poetry in 1930.
