= Kiribati language =

Micronesian language

Kiribati
- Gilbertese, Kirabatese, Tungaru
- Taetae ni Kiribati
- Native to: Kiribati
- Ethnicity: I-Kiribati
- Native speakers: 120,000 (2002–2019)
- Language family: Austronesian: Malayo-Polynesian; Oceanic; Central–Eastern Oceanic; Micronesian; Kiribati
- Early forms: Proto-Austronesian: Proto-Malayo-Polynesian; Proto-Oceanic; Proto-Central-Eastern Oceanic; Proto-Micronesian; Old Gilbertese
- Standard forms: Standard Gilbertese
- Dialects: Gilbertese dialects
- Writing system: Latin (Gilbertese alphabet)

Official status
- Official language in: Kiribati
- Regulated by: Kiribati Language Board

Language codes
- ISO 639-2: gil
- ISO 639-3: gil
- Glottolog: gilb1244
- Map showing the pre-colonial distribution of the Micronesian languages; Kiribati-speaking region is shaded blue and does not include the Line Islands and Rabi in Fiji

The Kiribati language (taetae ni Kiribati), also known as Gilbertese, and sometimes also as Kirabatese or Tungaru, is an Austronesian language spoken mainly in Kiribati. It belongs to the Micronesian branch of the Oceanic languages.

The word Kiribati, the current name of the islands, is the local adaptation of the European name "Gilberts" to Gilbertese phonology. Early European visitors, including Commodore John Byron, whose ships happened on Nikunau in 1765, had named some of the islands the Kingsmill or Kings Mill Islands or for the Northern group les îles Mulgrave in French but in 1820 they were renamed, in French, les îles Gilbert by Admiral Adam Johann von Krusenstern, after Captain Thomas Gilbert, who, along with Captain John Marshall, had passed through some of these islands in 1788. Frequenting of the islands by Europeans, Americans and Chinese dates from whaling and oil trading from the 1820s, when no doubt Europeans learnt to speak it, as Gilbertese learnt to speak English and other languages foreign to them. The first ever vocabulary list of Gilbertese was published by the French Revue coloniale (1847) by an auxiliary surgeon on corvette Le Rhin in 1845. His warship took on board a drift Gilbertese of Kuria, that they found near Tabiteuea. However, it was not until Hiram Bingham II took up missionary work on Abaiang in the 1860s that the language began to take on the written form known now.

Bingham was the first to translate the Bible into Gilbertese, and wrote several hymn books, a dictionary (1908, posthumous) and commentaries in the language of the Gilbert Islands. Alphonse Colomb, a French priest in Tahiti wrote in 1888, Vocabulaire arorai (îles Gilbert) précédé de notes grammaticales d'après un manuscrit du P. Latium Levêque et le travail de Hale sur la langue Tarawa / par le P. A. C.. Father Levêque named the Gilbertese Arorai (from Arorae) when Horatio Hale called them Tarawa. This work was also based on the first known description of Gilbertese in English, published in 1846, in the volume Ethnology and Philology of the U.S. Exploring Expedition, compiled by Horatio Hale.

The official name of the language is te taetae ni Kiribati, or 'the Gilbertese language', but the common name is te taetae n aomata, or 'the language of the people'.

The first complete and comprehensive description of this language was published in Dictionnaire gilbertin–français of Father Ernest Sabatier (981 pp, 1952–1954), a Catholic priest. It was later partially translated into English by Sister Olivia, with the help of the South Pacific Commission.

== Speakers ==
Over 96% of the 119,000 people living in Kiribati declare themselves I-Kiribati and speak Gilbertese. Gilbertese is also spoken by most inhabitants of Nui (Tuvalu), Rabi Island (Fiji), and some other islands where I-Kiribati have been relocated (Solomon Islands, notably Choiseul Province; and Vanuatu), after the Phoenix Islands Settlement Scheme or emigrated (to New Zealand and Hawaii mainly).

97% of those living in Kiribati are able to read in Gilbertese, and 80% are able to read English. It is one of the Oceanic languages. The largest individual Oceanic languages are Eastern Fijian with over 600,000 speakers, and Samoan with an estimated 400,000 speakers. The Gilbertese, Tongan, Tahitian, Māori, Western Fijian and Tolai (Gazelle Peninsula) languages each have over 100,000 speakers.

In 2020 Finlayson Park School in Auckland became the first school in New Zealand to set up a Gilbertese language unit, where Erika Taeang was employed as the teacher.

=== Countries by number of Gilbertese speakers ===
1. Kiribati, 103,000 (2010 census)
2. Fiji, 6,600 (2019)
3. Solomon Islands, 6,800 (2012)
4. New Zealand, 2,196 (2018 New Zealand census)
5. Nauru, 1,500, then 500 cited 2011
6. Tuvalu, 100 (2002)
7. Vanuatu, 400
8. United States of America (Hawaii), 141 (2010 US census)

== Dialects ==
The Gilbertese language has two main dialects, Northern and Southern. Their main differences are in the pronunciation of some sounds. The islands of Butaritari and Makin also have their own dialect that differs from the standard Kiribati in some vocabulary and pronunciation.

=== Dialect listing ===
- Banaban (Banaba and Rabi Island, Fiji)
- Northern Kiribati (Makin, Butaritari, Marakei, Abaiang, Tarawa, Maiana, Kuria, Abemama and Aranuka)
  - Butaritari/Makin (Butaritari and Makin)
- Nuian (Tuvalu)
- Southern Kiribati (Tabiteuea, Onotoa, Nonouti, Beru, Nikunau, Tamana and Arorae)

=== Historical sound changes ===
Gilbertese reflexes of Proto-Oceanic consonants (in IPA)
Proto-Oceanic	*mp	*mp,ŋp	*p	*m	*m,ŋm	*k	*ŋk	*ŋ	*j	*w	*t		*s,nj	*ns,j	*j	*nt,nd	*d,R	*l	*n	*ɲ
Proto-Micronesian	*p	*pʷ	*f	*m	*mʷ	*k	*x	*ŋ	*j	*w	*t	*T	*s	*S	*Z	*c	*r	*l	*n	*ɲ
Gilbertese	p	pʷ	∅	m	mʷ	k,∅^{1}	∅	ŋ	∅	βʷ	t,∅^{2}	t	t,s^{2}	r	r	r	∅	n	n	n

^{1} Sometimes when reflecting Proto-Micronesian /t/.
^{2} Sometimes when reflecting Proto-Micronesian /k/.

== Phonology ==
=== Consonants ===
Consonants
	Bilabial		Apical	Velar
	plain	labialized	Apical	Velar
Nasal	m ⟨m⟩	mʷ ⟨mw⟩	n ⟨n⟩	ŋ ⟨ng⟩
Stop	p (Note: Usually voiced intervocalically but also sometimes word-initially.) ⟨b⟩	pʷ ⟨bw⟩	t (Note: /t/ is lenited and assibilated to [s] before /i/.) ⟨t⟩	k ⟨k⟩
Continuant		βʷ (Note: The labiovelar fricative /βʷ/ has both flap and approximant allophones.) ⟨w⟩	ɾ (Note: /ɾ/ does not occur in the syllable coda.) ⟨r⟩	

All nasal consonants have geminated counterparts.

=== Vowels ===
Vowels
	Front	Back
Close (Note: Short /i/ and /u/ may become semivowels [j] and [w] when followed by more sonorous vowels. /ie/ → [je] ('sail'). Kiribati has syllabic nasals, although syllabic /n/ and /ŋ/ can be followed only by consonants that are homorganic.)	i	u
Mid	e	o
Open	a	

All vowel qualities have long vowel counterparts. The /a/ pronunciation is closer to [ä] except after velarized /mʷ/ and /pʷ/. Lee & Timee (2019) describe the additional monophthongs [ɛ] and [æ].

=== Length ===
Length is distinctive for vowels and plain nasal consonants but not for the remaining sounds so that ana /ana/ (third person singular article) contrasts with aana /aːna/ (transl. its underside) as well as anna /anːa/ (transl. dry land). Other minimal pairs include:

Minimal pairs for vowel length
	Short			Long		
	Example	IPA	Translation	Example	IPA	Translation
//e//	te ben	/tepen/	ripe coconut	te been	/tepeːn/	pen
//i//	ti	/ti/	we	tii	/tiː/	only
//o//	on	/on/	full	oon	/oːn/	turtles
//u//	te atu	/atu/	bundle	te atuu	/atuː/	head
//a//	tuanga	/twaŋa/	to tell	tuangga	/twaŋːa/	to tell him/her

== Alphabet ==
The Gilbertese language is written in the Latin script, which was introduced in the 1860s when Hiram Bingham Jr, a Protestant missionary, first translated the Bible into Gilbertese. Until then, the language was unwritten. Since the independence of Kiribati in 1979, long vowels and consonants are represented by doubling the character, as in Dutch and Finnish. A few digraphs are used for the velar nasals (/ŋ ŋː/) and velarized bilabials (/pʷ mʷ/). Bingham and the first Roman Catholic missionaries (1888) did not indicate in their script the vowel length by doubling the character. The discrepancies between the Protestant and Roman Catholic spellings have been an issue since 1895. Neither clearly distinguished the pronunciation of the vowel /a/ after velarized bilabials, like /pʷ/ (bw) and /mʷ/ (mw), which result in discrepancies between old scripts and modern scripts. For example, the word maneaba should be written mwaneaba or even mwaaneaba and the atoll of Makin, Mwaakin. The Kiribati Protestant Church has also recently used a different script for both velarized bilabials, “b’a” and “m’a”, which are found in Protestant publications.

Gilbertese spelling system
Letter	A	AA	B	BW	E	EE	I	II	K	M	MM	MW	N	NN	NG	NGG	O	OO	R	T	U	UU	W
IPA	/a/	/aː/	/p/	/pʷ/	/e/	/eː/	/i/	/iː/	/k/	/m/	/mː/	/mʷ/	/n/	/nː/	/ŋ/	/ŋː/	/o/	/oː/	/ɾ/	/t/	/u/	/uː/	/βʷ/

== Grammar ==
Gilbertese has a basic verb–object–subject word order (VOS).

=== Nouns ===
Gilbertese lacks a morphological noun-marker system. This means that—by itself—a noun cannot be identified as such. However, singular nouns can be distinguished from other words, as they are preceded by the article "te". However, not all singular nouns can take the article. These include names of people and places, words for cardinal directions, and other specific nouns.

Any noun can be formed from a verb or an adjective by preceding it with the article "te".

- nako (to go)
- te nako (the going)
- uraura (red)
- te uraura (the redness)

Nouns can be marked for possession (by person and number). Plurality is only marked in some nouns by lengthening the first vowel. Even then, the singular form might be used—despite plural referents—if no other indicators of their plurality are present.

- te boki (book)
- booki (books)

There is no obligatory marked gender. Sex or gender can be marked by adding mmwaane (male) or aiine (female) to the noun.

- te moa (chicken)
- te moa mmwaane (rooster) (writing mwane is more usual)
- te moa aiine (hen) (writing aine is more usual)
- tariu (my brother or my sister, if he or she has the same sex as the speaker)
- maneu (my brother or my sister, if he or she has a different sex from the speaker)

For human nouns, the linker 'n' may be used.

- ataei (child)
- ataeinimmwaane (boy)
- ataeinnaiine (girl)

Agent nouns can be created with the particle tia (singular) or taan(i) (plural).

In Gilbertese, nouns can be classified as either animate or inanimate. The category of animate nouns includes humans and most animals, whereas inanimate nouns refer to all other entities.

Possession, when the possessor is inanimate, is marked with the "n" clitic. In writing, it may be joined with the previous word, or written separately. In cases where the "n" marker would be otherwise incompatible with the language's phonotactics, one might use "in" or "ni" instead. In phrases where the possessor is animate, a special possessive pronoun needs to be employed (see Pronouns).

Nouns can also be classified as alienable or inalienable. Inalienable nouns include, among others, parts of the body, family, and feelings. Words which are newly introduced into the language are never considered to be inalienable. The meanings of certain words may vary according to whether or not they are considered alienable.

Adjectives can also be formed from nouns by reduplication with the meaning of "abundant in", e.g., karau ("rain"), kakarau ("rainy").

=== Articles ===
There are two articles used in Gilbertese:

Singular	Plural
te	taian

Neither of them implies definiteness, therefore both can be translated as "a(n)" and "the".

When preceding collective nouns or names of substances, "te" can be translated as "some." A limited set of nouns, typically referring to unique entities, dispense with te. This includes words like taai “sun”, karawa “sky”, taari/marawa “sea”, among others. Interestingly, Te Atua, “God”, is an exception. The article te also acts as a nominalizer, transforming adjectives into nouns. While te marks singular nouns, the language possesses a plural article taian. However, its use is restricted to countable nouns inherently implying plurality. Collective nouns typically don't take taian. In certain situations, when plurality is evident from surrounding words, taian can be omitted.

Personal articles
	Masculine	Feminine
Personal article	te (tem, ten, teng) — Na Nan Nang form could be used in Butaritari and Makin	nei

The personal articles are used before personal names. The masculine form is 'te' before names beginning with <i, u, w, b', ng>, 'tem' before <b, m>, 'ten' before <a, e, o, n, r, t> and 'teng' before <k, (ng)>.

=== Pronouns ===
Pronouns have different forms according to case: nominative (subject), accusative (object), emphatic (vocatives, adjunct pronouns), genitive (possessives).

		Nominative	Accusative	Emphatic	Genitive	Possessive suffixes
1st person	singular	i, n	-ai	ngai	au	-u
1st person	plural	ti	-ira	ngaira	ara	-ra
2nd person	singular	ko	-ko	ngkoe	am	-m
2nd person	plural	kam	-ngkamii	ngkamii	amii	-mii
3rd person	singular	e	-a	ngaia	ana	-na/n
3rd person	plural	a	-ia/i	ngaiia	aia	-ia

=== Demonstratives ===
The Gilbertese language employs a system of demonstratives to indicate the spatial proximity of the referent to the speaker. These demonstratives are postnominal, meaning they follow the noun they modify.

	Basic		Masculine		Feminine	Human	Neuter		Translation	
	singular	plural	singular	plural	singular	plural	singular	plural	singular	plural
Proximal	aei	aikai	teuaaei	uaakai	neiei	naakai	te baei	baikai	“this” (this here, near me)	“these”
Medial	anne	akanne	teuaanne	uakanne	neienne	naakanne	te baenne	baikanne	“that” (near you but far from me)	“those”
Distal	arei	akekei	teuaarei	uaakekei	neierei	naakekei	te baerei	baikekei	“that” (far away from both of us)	“those”

The feminine demonstrative has no plural form, as opposed to the masculine, and the human plural encapsulates groups of mixed gender.

Adverbial pronouns also have a three-way distinction of distance: proximal, medial and distal.

	Relative	Demonstrative	
	Relative	Time	Place
Proximal	ngkai, ngkae (“now that”)	ngkai (“now”)	ikai (“here”)
Medial	ngkana (future “when/if”)	ngkanne (future “then”)	ikanne (“there,” near you)
Distal	ngke (past “when/if”)	ngkekei (past “then”)	ikekei (“there,” far from us)

Ngke is used for hypothetical scenarios that would have an effect today, have they changed in the past. Ngkana is used for situations whereof the outcome or truth is not yet known.

=== Adjectives ===
While they share many similarities with intransitive verbs, there are a few patterns that can be observed among adjectives. Many adjectives, such as mainaina (“white”), contain a repeated element. While some non-reduplicated adjectives exist, reduplication appears to be dominant.

Nouns typically lengthen their first vowel to indicate plural. Conversely, adjectives tend to shorten their first vowel for pluralization (e.g., anaanau (long - singular) becomes ananau (long - plural)).

Gilbertese employs distinct strategies for forming comparative and superlative constructions. Comparatives are relatively straightforward, achieved by adding the adverb riki (“more”) after the adjective (e.g., ririeta (“high”) becomes ririeta riki (“higher”)). Expressing “better than” requires the preposition nakon (“than”) along with a construction that compares the noun-like qualities derived from the adjectives:

E aki bootau an aakoi tar im.
You are not as kind as your brother. (lit. Your kindness is not equal to that of your brother.)

Superlatives are formed with the intensifier moan and the article te preceding the adjective. For example, raoiroi (“good”) becomes moan te raoiroi (“the best”).

=== Verbs ===
Verbs do not conjugate according to person, number, tense, aspect or mood. These verbal categories are indicated by particles. Nonetheless, a passive suffix -aki is used as in:

- E kabooa te raiti He bought the rice.
- E kabooaki te raiti The rice was bought (by him).

Any adjective can also be an intransitive verb. Transitive verbs can be formed by the circumfix ka- (...) -a creating a causative verb, e.g. "uraura" (to be red) becomes "kaurauraa" (to redden). Tense is marked by adverbs. However, the default interpretation of the unmarked (by adverbs) verb is a past tense. Below is a list of verbal particles:

- a (immediate, incompleted and indeterminate)
- tabe n(i) (progressive)
- nang(i) (prospective future)
- na (general future)
- a tib'a (immediate past)
- a tia n(i) (past perfect)

==== Copula verbs ====
There are no verbs corresponding to English "to be", so a stative verb must be used or a zero copula strategy:

Te tia mmwakuri teuaarei.
A workman that man.
That man is a workman.

There is also a locative copula verb "mena":

E mena iaon te taibora te booro.
The ball is on the table

==== Existential verb ====
There is no corresponding verb to "to have", instead an existential verb meaning "there to be" is used - iai.

==== Reduplication ====
In verbs, reduplication is used to mark aspect.

- Partial reduplication marks the habitual aspect for example "nako" (to go) and "naanako" (to usually go).
- Full reduplication shows the continuative aspect, e.g. "koro" (to cut), "korokoro" (to continually cut).
- Mixed: "kiba" (to jump), "kiikiba" (to usually jump), "kibakiba" (to continually jump, to be excited), "kikibakiba" (to jump on regular occasions).

==== Negation ====
The main negator is the particle "aki" placed after the pronoun and before the verb. The negator "aikoa" is for counterexpected situations.

Ko aki taetae: You don't speak.

=== Numerals ===
Gilbertese uses classifiers for counting with numerals like Asian languages (Chinese, Vietnamese, etc.). These classifiers are suffixes to the numerals: -ua (general, for objects), -man (animate beings), -kai (plants, land, fish hooks), -ai (fish, elongated objects), -waa (transportation), -baa (leaves, flat objects) among many others. It is a decimal system with -bwi as a "10-counting" suffix. Zero ("akea") is just the word for 'nothing'.

	Root	With -ua classifier
0	akea	-
1	te	teuana
2	uo/ua	uoua
3	ten(i)	tenua
4	a	aua
5	nima	nimaua
6	ono	onoua
7	it(i)	itiua
8	wan(i)	waniua
9	ruai	ruaiua
10	te	tebwina

=== Conjunctions ===
Multiple nouns may be joined with either ao (“and”) or ma (“and; with”). To join adjectives or verb, one may use man. The conjunction ke (“or”) can be used with any part of speech.

In subordinate clauses, the main clause usually comes first, with an appropriate conjunction in-between the two.

== Vocabulary ==
One difficulty in translating the Bible was references to words such as "mountain", a geographical phenomenon unknown to the people of the islands of Kiribati at the time, heard only in the myths from Samoa. Bingham substituted "hilly", which would be more easily understood. Such adjustments are common to all languages as "modern" things require the creation of new words or the usage of loan words.

For example, the Gilbertese word for airplane is te wanikiba, "the canoe that flies". Some words changed to translate Western words into Gilbertese. For example, te aro 'species or colour' is now used in translating religion. Te kiri 'the dog', found in 1888 vocabulary, is now less used than te kamea 'the dog' (from English, loan word).

Catholic missionaries arrived at the islands in 1888 and translated the Bible independently of Bingham, which led to differences (Bingham wrote Jesus as "Iesu", but the Catholics wrote "Ietu") that would be resolved only in the 20th century. In 1954, Father Ernest Sabatier published the larger and more accurate Kiribati to French dictionary (translated into English by Sister Olivia): Dictionnaire gilbertin–français, 981 pages (edited by South Pacific Commission in 1971). It remains the only work of importance between the Kiribati language and a Western language. It was then reversed by Frédéric Giraldi in 1995 to creating the first French-Kiribati dictionary. In addition, a grammar section was added by Father Gratien Bermond (MSC). The dictionary is available at the French National Library Rare Language Department and at the headquarters of the Missionaries of the Sacred Heart (MSC), Issoudun.

=== Loanwords ===
When arriving, the translation of the Bible (te Baibara) was the first duty of the missionaries. Protestants (1860) and Roman Catholics (1888) had to find or create some words that were not in use in the Gilbert Islands, like mountain (te maunga, borrowing it from Hawaiian mauna or Samoan maunga), and like serpents, but also to find a good translation for God (te Atua). Many words were adapted from English, like te moko (smoke), te buun (spoon), te beeki (pig), te raiti (rice), te tai (time, a watch), te auti (house), te katamwa (cat, from expression cat-at-me). Some words of the Swadesh list did not exist in Gilbertese like te aiti (ice) or te tinoo (snow). New Gilbertese words were also coined for new concepts: te rebwerebwe (motorbike), te wanikiba (plane, a flying canoe), te momi (pearl, from Hawaiian).

== Bibliography ==
- Blevins, Juliette; Harrison, Sheldon P. (1999). "Trimoraic Feet in Gilbertese". Oceanic Linguistics. 38 (2): 203–230. doi:10.1353/ol.1999.0012. S2CID 143647044.
- Cowell, Reid (1951). The Structure of Gilbertese. Rongorongo Press.
- Lee, Seunghun J.; Timee, Tekonnang (2019). "Aspects of the Kiribati grammar". International Christian University Repository: 23–31.
- Trussel, Stephen; Groves, Gordon W. (1978). A Combined Kiribati-English Dictionary based on the works of Hiram Bingham, D.D. and Father Ernest Sabatier, M.S.C. (translated by Sr. M. Oliva) with additional scientific material from Luomala, Goo & Banner. University of Hawaii.
- Groves, Terab'ata R.; Groves, Gordon W.; Jacobs, Roderick (1985). Kiribatese: An Outline Description. Australian National University. ISBN 0858833182.
