= Kiribati =

Island country in the central Pacific

Republic of Kiribati Ribaberiki Kiribati (Gilbertese)
- Flag Coat of arms
- Motto: Te Mauri, te Raoi ao te Tabomoa (Gilbertese) "Health, Peace, and Prosperity"
- Anthem: Kunan Kiribati (Gilbertese) "Song of Kiribati"
- Capital and largest city: Tarawa; 1°28′N 173°2′E
- Official languages: Gilbertese; English
- Ethnic groups (2020 census): 95.7% Gilbertese; 4.3% other
- Religion (2020 census): 96.2% Christianity; 58.9% Catholic Church; 21.2% Uniting Church; 16.1% other Christian; 2.1% Bahá'í Faith; 1.7% other / none
- Demonym: I-Kiribati
- Government: Unitary parliamentary republic with an executive president
  - President: Taneti Maamau
  - Vice-President: Vacant
  - Speaker of the House of Assembly: Willie Tokataake
- Legislature: House of Assembly

Independence from the United Kingdom
  - Granted: 12 July 1979
  - Treaty of Tarawa: 20 September 1979

Area
  - Total: 811.19 km^{2} (313.20 sq mi) (172nd)

Population
  - 2026 estimate: 138,000 (192nd)
  - 2024 census: 119,438
  - Density: 170.37/km^{2} (441.3/sq mi) (77th)
- GDP (PPP): 2025 estimate
  - Total: ▲$543 million
  - Per capita: ▲$3,930
- GDP (nominal): 2025 estimate
  - Total: ▲$349 million
  - Per capita: ▲$2,520
- Gini (2019): 27.8 low inequality
- HDI (2023): ▲0.644 medium (140th)
- Currency: Australian dollar ($) (AUD)
- Time zone: UTC+12, +13, +14
- Calling code: +686
- ISO 3166 code: KI
- Internet TLD: .ki

Kiribati, (Note: UK: /ˌkɪr.ə.ˈbɑːt.i/, US: /-ˈbæt.i/, UK: /-ˈbɑːs/ US: /ˈkɪr.ɪ.bæs/; Gilbertese: [kiɾibas]. Despite the recommended English pronunciations with /bæs/, which are more faithful to the original Gilbertese, the more usual English pronunciations are based intuitively on the spelling.) officially the Republic of Kiribati, (Note: Gilbertese: Ribaberiki Kiribati) is an archipelagic country spanning the Micronesia and Polynesia sub-regions of Oceania in the central Pacific Ocean. The state comprises 32 atolls and other islands and one remote raised coral island, Banaba. Its total land area is 811 km^{2} (313 sq mi) dispersed over 3,441,810 km^{2} (1,328,890 sq mi) of ocean. The spread of the country's islands, from Banaba in the west to Kiritimati in the east, straddles the equator and the 180th meridian. The International Date Line goes around Kiribati and swings far to the east, almost reaching 150°W. This brings Kiribati's easternmost islands, the southern Line Islands south of Hawaii, into the same day as the Gilbert Islands and places them in the most advanced time zone on Earth: UTC+14.

The permanent population of Kiribati is just over 138,000 as of the 2026 census, and more than half live on Tarawa. There is also a significant number of I‑Kiribati forming a diaspora, the largest of which still growing via emigration is probably in New Zealand; historically, diasporic communities were created through over-population resettlement in the Solomon Islands on Ghizo and Wagina, and through intermarriage in the United Kingdom and United States. Another country with growing diasporic communities born of recent labour immigration is Australia. The I‑Kiribati are a Micronesian people who speak the Gilbertese language.

The Gilberts were politically autonomous of each other, more or less, and anywhere else, until annexed as a protectorate in 1892 by the British; they had no political connection then with the Phoenix or Line islands. This annexation was ended in 1979, when Kiribati gained its independence from the United Kingdom, becoming a sovereign state in 1979. The sovereign state included the Gilberts, the Phoenix and Line islands and Banaba. The capital, Tarawa, now the most populated area, consists of a number of islets, connected by a series of causeways. These comprise about half the area of Tarawa Atoll. Prior to its independence the country exported phosphate, but the mine, on Banaba, is virtually exhausted and no longer viable. The descendants of the Banabans mostly live in exile on Rabi in Fiji but are represented in the Kiribati Parliament.

Fisheries, subsistence agriculture and the export of copra drive much of the economy, particularly on outer islands away from Tarawa. Kiribati is one of the least developed countries in the world and its government is highly dependent on fishing licence fees from foreign fleets and international capital aid to finance infrastructure and other projects. Many families rely on remittances from circular labour migrants (seafarers, agricultural workers, urban service workers). They also work for the government or for private business and non-business organisations, or run trade stores and small private cooperative-like businesses. The government now pays benefits to the unemployed on Tarawa and to the elderly.

Kiribati is a member of the Pacific Community, Commonwealth of Nations, the International Monetary Fund, the World Bank, and the Organisation of African, Caribbean and Pacific States, and became a full member of the United Nations in 1999.

As an atoll (and other low-lying island) nation, Kiribati is acutely vulnerable to sea-level rise and climate change. This is in addition to threats from tsunamis since time-immemorial. Addressing climate change has been a central part of its international policy, as a member of the Alliance of Small Island States. In Kiribati, climate change and extreme weather events are predicted to become more frequent. Additionally, existing socio-economic and environmental pressures are intensifying.

== Etymology and pronunciation ==
The name is pronounced /ˈkɪrɪbæs/ KIRR-i-bass, as -ti in the Gilbertese language represents an [s] sound. Similarly, the name of its people, the I-Kiribati, is pronounced /iːˈkɪrɪbæs/ ee-KIRR-i-bass.

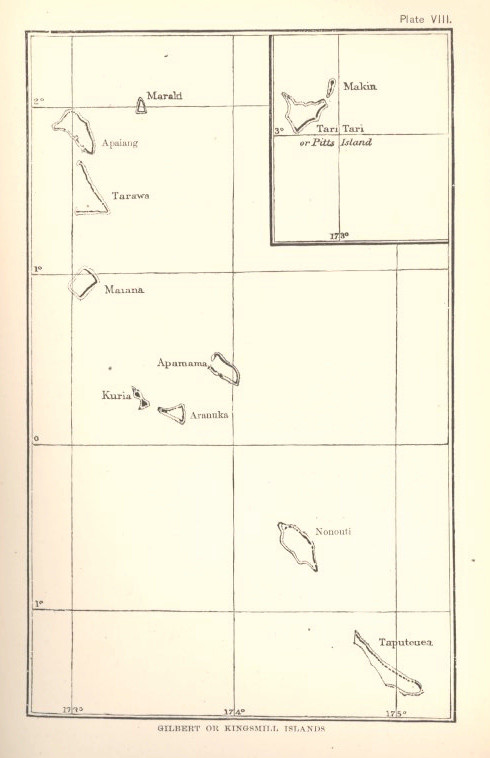
Map of the Gilbert or Kingsmill Islands, 1890

The name Kiribati was adopted upon the country's independence in 1979. It is the Gilbertese rendition of Gilberts, the plural of the English name of the nation's main archipelago, the Gilbert Islands. It was named îles Gilbert (French for 'Gilbert Islands') in about 1820 by Russian admiral Adam von Krusenstern and French captain Louis Duperrey, after the British captain Thomas Gilbert. Gilbert and captain John Marshall sighted some of the islands in 1788, while charting the "outer passage" route from Port Jackson to Canton. Both von Krusenstern's and Duperrey's maps, published in 1824, were written in French.

In French, the Northern Islands were until then called îles Mulgrave and Byron's Island was not part of them. In English, the archipelago, particularly the southern part, was often referred to as the Kingsmills in the 19th century, although the name Gilbert Islands was used increasingly, including for the purposes of the Western Pacific High Commission in the Western Pacific Order-in-Council of 1877 and Pacific Order-in-Council of 1893.

The name Gilbert, already in the name of the British protectorate since 1892, was incorporated into the name of the entire Gilbert and Ellice Islands Colony (GEIC) from 1916 and was retained after the Ellice Islands became the separate country of Tuvalu in 1976. The spelling of Gilberts in the Gilbertese language as Kiribati may be found in books in Gilbertese prepared by missionaries, but with the meaning of Gilbertese (demonym and language) (see e.g., Hawaiian Board of Missionaries, 1895). The first mention as a dictionary entry of the word Kiribati as the native name of the country was written down in 1952 by Ernest Sabatier in his comprehensive Dictionnaire gilbertin–français.

The indigenous name often suggested for the Gilbert Islands proper is Tungaru (see e.g., Ernest Sabatier, 1952–1953, or Arthur Grimble, 1989). The rendition Kiribati for Gilberts was chosen as the official name of the new independent state by the chief minister, Sir Ieremia Tabai and his cabinet, on such grounds that it was modern, and to indicate the inclusion of islands (e.g., the Phoenix and Line Islands), beyond the Tungaru (i.e., Gilbert) chain. (Note: Sabatier (1954) says that Kiribati is already the meaning for all the Gilberts District of GEIC.)

== History ==
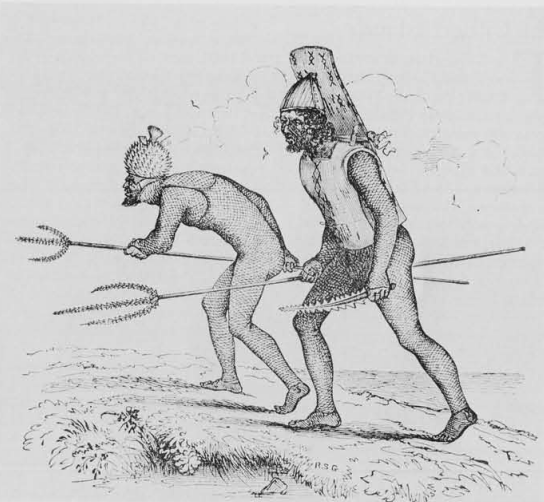
Gilbertese warriors of Tabiteuea, with shark's teeth weapons, c. 1841

=== Early history ===
The area now called Kiribati has been inhabited by Austronesian peoples speaking the same Oceanic language, from north to south, including the southernmost Nui, since sometime between 3000 BC and 1300 AD. The area was not completely isolated; later, voyagers from Samoa, Tonga, and Fiji introduced some Polynesian and Melanesian cultural aspects, respectively. Intermarriage and intense navigation between the islands tended to blur cultural differences and resulted in a significant degree of cultural homogenization. Local oral historians chiefly in the form of lore keepers suggest that the area was first inhabited by a group of seafaring people from Melanesia, who were described as being dark-skinned, frizzy-haired, and short in stature. These indigenous peoples were then visited by early Austronesian seafarers from the west, a place called Matang, orally described as being tall and fair-skinned.

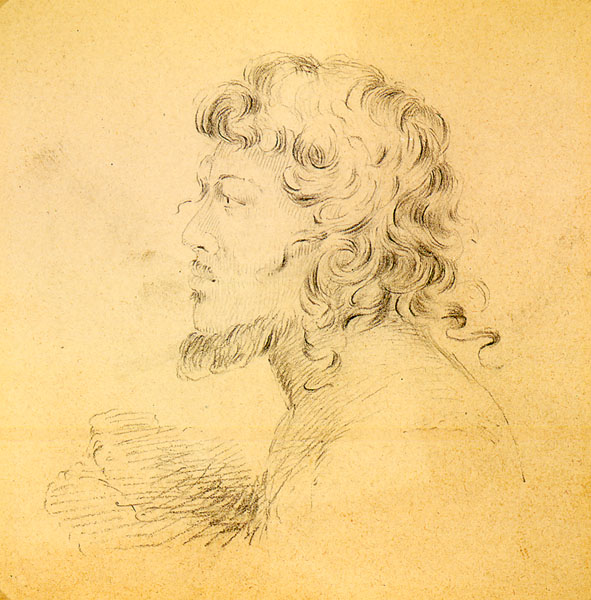
Portrait of a native of the Makin Islands, drawn by Alfred Thomas Agate (1841)

Around AD 1300, a mass departure occurred from Samoa leading to the addition of Polynesian ancestry into the mix of most Gilbertese people. These Samoans later brought strong features of Polynesian languages and culture, creating clans based on their own Samoan traditions and slowly intertwining with the indigenous clans and powers already dominant in Kiribati.

Around the 15th century, starkly contrasting systems of governance arose between the northern islands, primarily under chiefly rule (uea), and the central and southern islands, primarily under the rule of their council of elders (unimwaane). Tabiteuea could be an exception as the sole island that is known as maintaining a traditional egalitarian society.

The name Tabiteuea stems from the root phrase Tabu-te-Uea, meaning "chiefs are forbidden". Civil war soon became a factor, with acquisition of land being the main form of conquest. Clans and chiefs began fighting over resources, stimulated by hatred and reignited blood feuds, which had their origins months, years, or even decades before. The turmoil lasted well into the European visitation and colonial era, which led to certain islands decimating their foes with the help of guns and cannon-equipped ships that Europeans provided to some I-Kiribati leaders.

The typical military arms of the I-Kiribati at this time were shark tooth-embedded wooden spears, knives, and swords, and garbs of armour fashioned from dense coconut fibre. They were used instead of the gunpowder and weapons of steel available at the time, because of the strong sentimental value of the equipment handed down through generations. Ranged weapons, such as bows, slings, and javelins, were seldom used; hand-to-hand combat was a prominent skill still practised today, though seldom mentioned because of various taboos associated with it, secrecy being the primary one. Abemama's High Chief Tembinok' was the last of the dozens of expansionist chiefs of Gilbert Islands of this period, despite Abemama historically conforming to the traditional southern islands' governance of their respective unimwaane. He was immortalised in Robert Louis Stevenson's book In the South Seas, which delved into the high chief's character and method of rule during Stevenson's stay in Abemama. The 90th anniversary of his arrival in the Gilbert Islands was chosen to celebrate the independence of Kiribati on 12 July 1979.

=== Colonial era ===
Chance visits by European ships occurred in the 17th and 18th centuries, while those ships attempted circumnavigations of the world, or sought sailing routes from the south to north Pacific Ocean, a passing trade, whaling the On-The-Line grounds, and labour ships associated with the coercive labour recruitment practices, known as blackbirding. This recruitment of Kanaka workers in large numbers during the 19th century, had social, economic, political, religious and cultural consequences. More than 9,000 workers were sent abroad from 1845 to 1895, most of them not returning.

The passing trade gave rise to European, Indian, Chinese, Samoan, and other residents from the 1830s; they included beachcombers, castaways, traders, and missionaries. Dr Hiram Bingham II of the American Board of Commissioners for Foreign Missions (ABCFM) arrived on Abaiang in 1857. The Catholic faith was introduced on Nonouti around 1880 by 2 Gilbert islanders, Betero and Tiroi, who had become Christians in Tahiti. Fr Joseph Leray, Fr Edward Bontemps and Brother Conrad Weber, who were Missionaries of the Sacred Heart, arrived on Nonouti in 1888. The Protestant missionaries of the London Missionary Society (LMS) were also active in the southern Gilberts. On 15 October 1870, Rev. Samuel James Whitmee of the LMS arrived at Arorae, and later that month he visited Tamana, Onotoa and Beru. In August 1872, George Pratt of the LMS visited the islands.

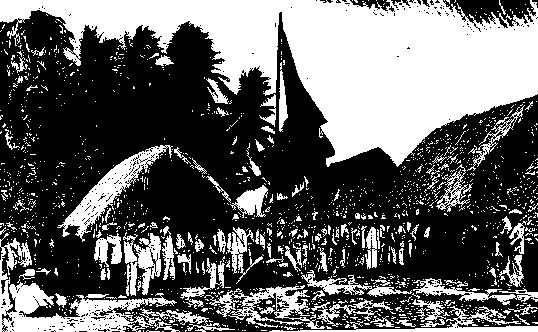
Declaration of a protectorate on Abemama by Captain EHM Davis, 27 May 1892

In 1886, an Anglo-German agreement partitioned the "unclaimed" central Pacific, leaving Nauru in the German sphere of influence and Banaba (formerly Ocean Island) and the future GEIC in the British sphere of influence. In 1892, local Gilbertese authorities (an uea, a chief from the Northern Gilbert Group, and atun te boti or head of clan) on each of the Gilbert Islands agreed to Captain Edward Davis commanding HMS Royalist of the Royal Navy declaring them part of a British protectorate, along with the nearby Ellice Islands. They were administered by a resident commissioner based first on Makin Islands (1893–95), then in Betio, Tarawa (1896–1908) and Banaba (1908–1942), protectorate who was under the Western Pacific High Commission (WPHC) based in Fiji. Banaba was added to the protectorate in 1900, because of the phosphate rock of its soil (discovered in 1900). This discovery and the mining provided a significant amount of revenue, in the form of taxes and duties, to the WPHC.

The conduct of William Telfer Campbell, the second resident commissioner of the Gilberts and Ellice Islands of 1896 to 1908, was criticised as to his legislative, judicial and administrative management (including allegations of forced labour exacted from islanders) and became the subject of the 1909 report by Arthur Mahaffy. In 1913, an anonymous correspondent to The New Age newspaper described the maladministration of W. Telfer Campbell and challenged the impartiality of Arthur Mahaffy, because he was a former colonial official in the Gilberts. The anonymous correspondent also criticised the operations of the Pacific Phosphate Company on Banaba.

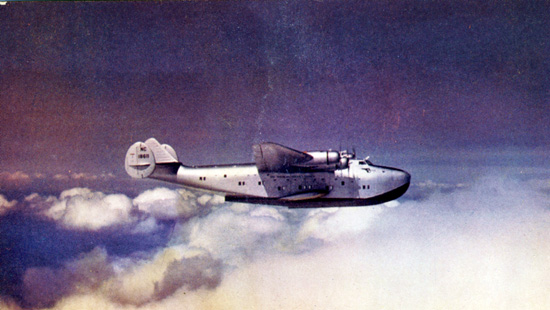
Boeing 314 Clipper in cruise, 1940

The islands became the crown colony of the Gilbert and Ellice Islands in 1916. The Northern Line Islands, including Christmas Island (Kiritimati), were added to the colony in 1919, and the Phoenix Islands were added in 1937 with the purpose of a Phoenix Islands Settlement Scheme. On 12 July 1940, Pan Am Airways' American Clipper landed at Canton Island for the first time during a flight from Honolulu to Auckland. Sir Arthur Grimble was a cadet administrative officer based at Tarawa (1913–1919) and became Resident Commissioner of the Gilbert and Ellice Islands colony in 1926.

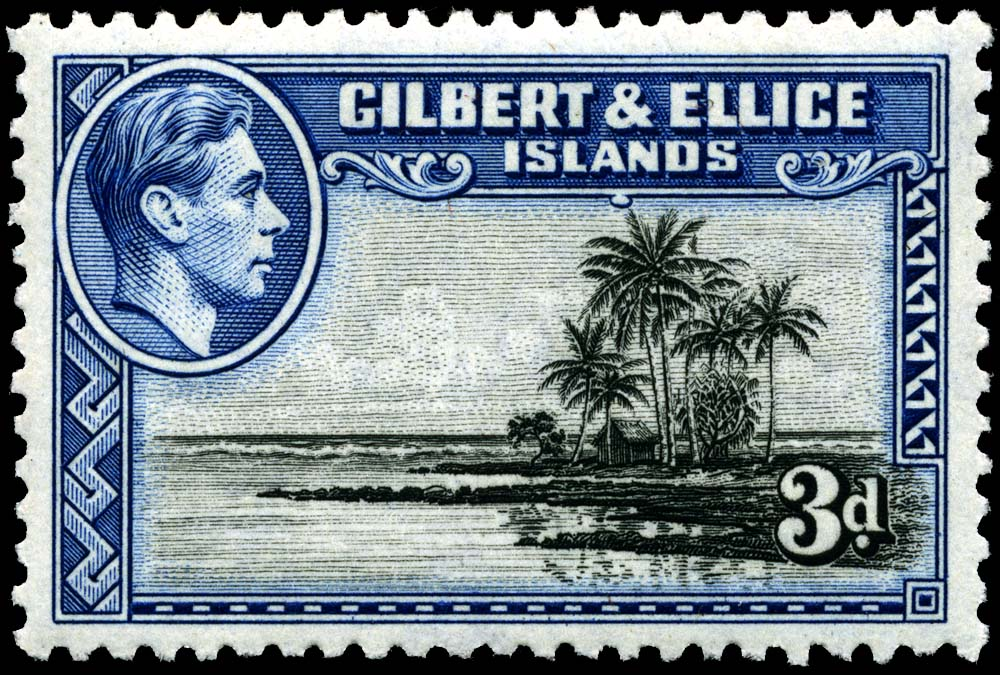
Stamp with portrait of King George VI, 1939

In 1902, the Pacific Cable Board laid the first trans-Pacific telegraph cable from Bamfield, British Columbia, to Fanning Island (Tabuaeran) in the Line Islands, and from Fiji to Fanning Island, thus completing the All Red Line, a series of telegraph lines circumnavigating the globe completely within the British Empire. The location of Fanning Island, one of the closest formations to Hawaii, led to its annexation by the British Empire in 1888. Nearby candidates including Palmyra Island were not favoured due to the lack of adequate landing sites.

The United States eventually incorporated the Northern Line Islands into its territories, and did the same with the Phoenix Islands, which lie between Gilberts and the Line Islands, including Howland, Jarvis, and Baker islands, thus causing a territorial dispute. That was eventually resolved and they finally became part of Kiribati under the Treaty of Tarawa.

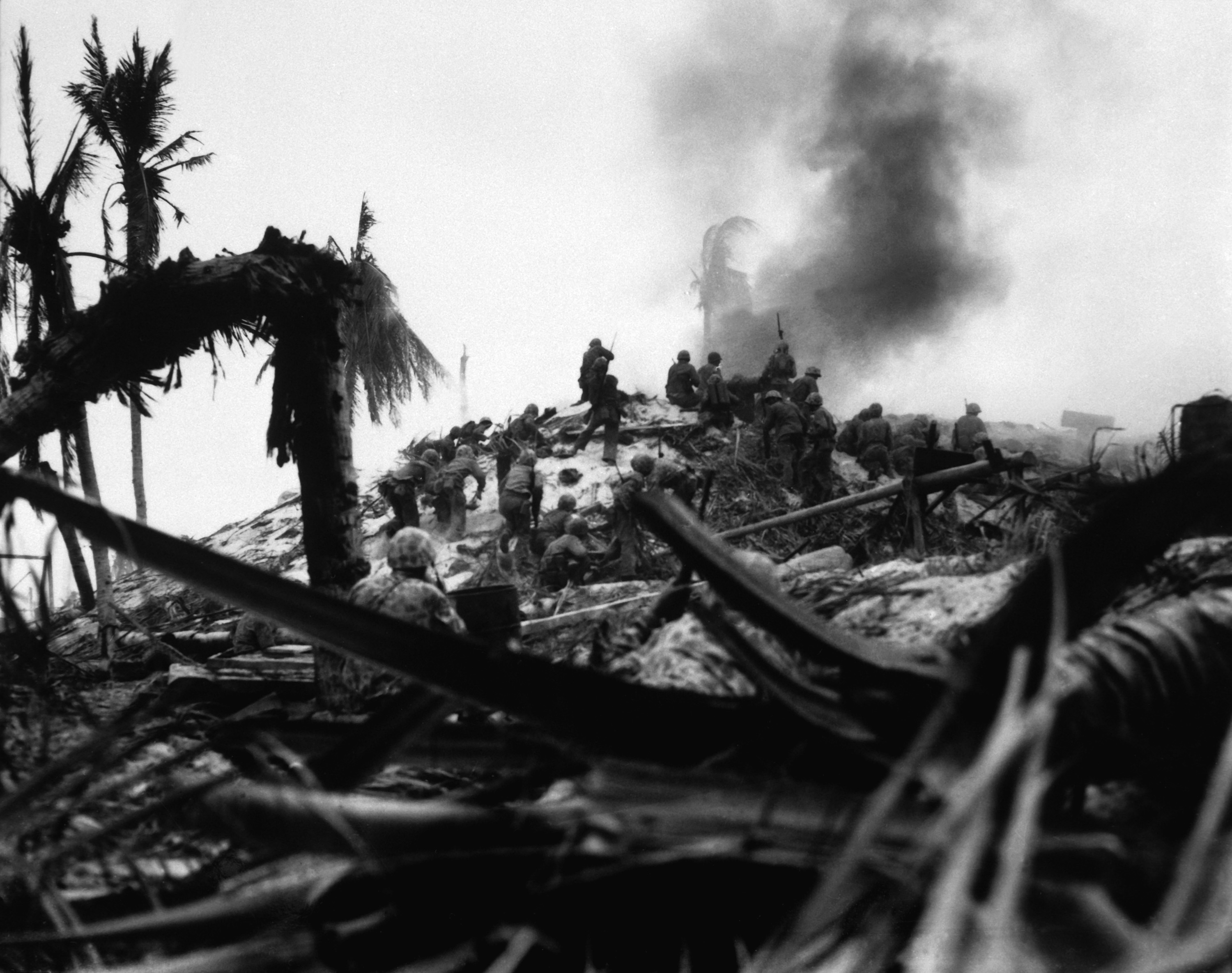
American Marines assault a Japanese bunker during the Battle of Tarawa, November 1943

After the attack on Pearl Harbor, during World War II, Butaritari and Tarawa, and others of the Northern Gilbert group, were occupied by Japan from 1941 to 1943. Betio became an airfield and supply base. The expulsion of the Japanese forces in late 1943 involved one of the bloodiest battles in US Marine Corps history. Marines landed in November 1943 and the Battle of Tarawa ensued. As the headquarters of the colony, Banaba was bombed, evacuated and occupied by Japan in 1942 and not freed until 1945, after the massacre of all but one of the Gilbertese on the island by the Japanese forces. Funafuti then hosted the provisional headquarters of the colony from 1942 to 1946, when Tarawa returned to host the headquarters.

At the end of 1945, most of the remaining inhabitants of Banaba, repatriated from Kosrae, Nauru and Tarawa, were relocated to Rabi Island, an island of Fiji that the British government had acquired in 1942 for this purpose.

On 1 January 1953, the British Western Pacific High Commissioner of the colony was transferred from Fiji to the new capital of Honiara, to the British Solomon Islands, with the Gilberts' Resident Commissioner still located in Tarawa.

Further military operations in the colony occurred in the late 1950s and early 1960s when Christmas Island was used by the United States and United Kingdom for nuclear weapons testing including hydrogen bombs.

Institutions of internal self-rule were established on Tarawa from about 1967. The Ellice Islands requested their separation from the rest of the colony in 1974 and were granted their own internal self-rule institutions. The separation entered into force on 1 January 1976. In 1978, the Ellice Islands became the independent state of Tuvalu.

=== Independence ===
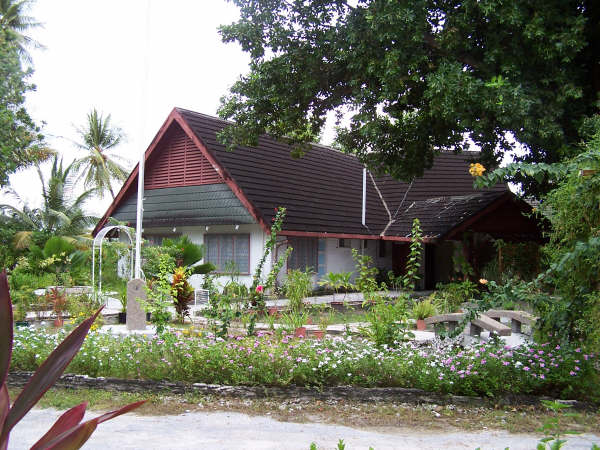
The Presidential residence, former Government House, Bairiki

The Gilbert Islands gained independence as the Republic of Kiribati on 12 July 1979. Then, in September, the United States relinquished all claims to the sparsely inhabited Phoenix and Line Islands, in a 1979 treaty of friendship with Kiribati (ratified in 1983). Although the indigenous Gilbertese name for the Gilbert Islands proper is "Tungaru", the new state chose the name "Kiribati", the Gilbertese spelling of "Gilberts", because it was more modern and as an equivalent of the former colony to acknowledge the inclusion of Banaba, the Line Islands, and the Phoenix Islands. The last two archipelagoes were never initially occupied by Gilbertese until the British authorities, and later the republic's government, resettled Gilbertese there under resettlement schemes. In 1982, the first elections since independence were held. A no-confidence vote provoked another election in 1983. In the post-independence period, overcrowding has been an issue, at least in British and aid organisations' eyes. In 1988, an announcement was made that 4,700 residents of the main island group would be resettled onto less populated islands. In September 1994, Teburoro Tito from the opposition was elected president.

In 1995, Kiribati unilaterally moved the International Date Line far to the east to encompass the Line Islands group, so that the country would no longer be divided by the date line. The move, which fulfilled one of President Tito's campaign promises, was intended to allow businesses across the expansive territory to keep the same business week. This also enabled Kiribati to become the first country to see the dawn of the third millennium, an event of significance for tourism. Tito was re-elected in 1998. In 1999, Kiribati became a full member of the United Nations, 20 years after independence. In 2002, Kiribati passed a controversial law that enabled the government to shut down newspaper publishers. The legislation followed the launching of Kiribati's first successful non-government-run newspaper. President Tito was re-elected in 2003 but was removed from office in March 2003 by a no-confidence vote and replaced by a Council of State. Anote Tong of the opposition party Boutokaan Te Koaua was elected to succeed Tito in July 2003. He was re-elected in 2007 and in 2011.

In June 2008, Kiribati officials asked Australia and New Zealand to accept Kiribati citizens as permanent refugees. Kiribati is expected to be the first country to lose all its land territory to climate change. In June 2008, Kiribati President Anote Tong said that the country had reached "the point of no return." He added, "To plan for the day when you no longer have a country is indeed painful but I think we have to do that."

In January 2012, Anote Tong was re-elected for a third and last successive term. In early 2012, the government of Kiribati acquired the 2,200-hectare Natoavatu Estate on the second largest island of Fiji, Vanua Levu. At the time it was widely reported that the government planned to evacuate the entire population of Kiribati to Fiji. In April 2013, President Tong began urging citizens to evacuate the islands and migrate elsewhere. In May 2014, the Office of the President confirmed the purchase of some 5,460 acres of land on Vanua Levu at a cost of 9.3 million Australian dollars.

In March 2016, Taneti Maamau was elected and took office as the fifth President of Kiribati. In June 2020, President Maamau won re-election for a second four-year term. President Maamau was considered pro-China and he supported closer ties with Beijing. On 16 November 2021, the Kiribati government announced it would open the world's largest marine protected area to commercial fishing. The 2022 Kiribati constitutional crisis started with the suspension of all five major justices of the judiciary of Kiribati.

In 2020, Kiribati's response to the COVID-19 pandemic, consistent with most of the COVID-19 responses of Oceania island nations, was to impose strict limits on tourism and commercial travel. Kiribati reported that it remained essentially COVID-free (two cases) until January 2022 when the first commercial international flight in two years included 36 passengers who tested positive. In 2024, 5,085 Coronavirus Cases were reported which caused 24 deaths, while 2,703 were reported to have recovered. On 29 January 2023, Kiribati confirmed its intention to rejoin the Pacific Islands Forum, ending a bitter two-year leadership split.

On 9 December 2025, Kiribati signed the High Seas Treaty, in an effort to establish large-scale marine protected areas in territorial waters beyond their national 200-nautical-mile zones and conduct environmental impact assessments for activities in the high seas.

== Politics ==
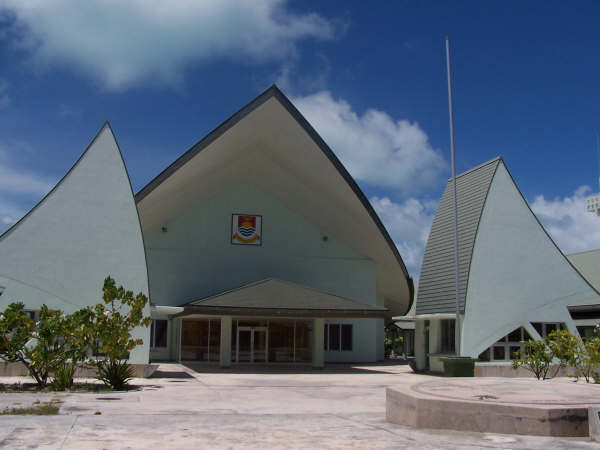
Maneaba ni Maungatabu, House of Assembly, 2000

The Constitution of Kiribati, promulgated 12 July 1979, provides for free and open elections in a parliamentary democratic republic.

The executive branch consists of a president (te Beretitenti), a vice-president and a cabinet. The president, who is also chief of the cabinet, is directly elected by the citizens, after the legislature nominates three or four persons from among its members to be candidates in the ensuing presidential election. The president is limited to serving three four-year terms, and remains a member of the assembly. The cabinet is composed of the president, vice-president, and 13 ministers (appointed by the president) who are also members of parliament.

The legislative branch is the unicameral Maneaba ni Maungatabu (House of Assembly). Its members are elected, including by constitutional mandate, a nominated representative of the Banaban people in Rabi Island, Fiji (Banaba, former Ocean Island), in addition to, until 2016, the attorney general, who served as an ex officio member from 1979 to 2016. Legislators serve for a four-year term.

The constitutional provisions governing administration of justice are similar to those in other former British colonies in that the judiciary is free from governmental interference. The judicial branch is made up of the High Court (in Betio) and the Court of Appeal. The president appoints the presiding judges.

Local government is through island councils with elected members. Local affairs are handled in a manner similar to town meetings in colonial America. Island councils make their own estimates of revenue and expenditure and generally are free from central government controls. There are a total of 21 inhabited islands in Kiribati. Each inhabited island has its own council. Kiribati is currently divided into 5 districts: Northern Kiribati, Central Kiribati, Southern Kiribati, South Tarawa, and Line & Phoenix.

Kiribati has formal political parties but their organisation is quite informal. Ad hoc opposition groups tend to coalesce around specific issues. There is universal suffrage at age 18. Today the main political parties are the Boutokaan Kiribati Moa Party, former Boutokaan te Koaua, and Tobwaan Kiribati Party.

=== Foreign relations ===
Kiribati maintains close relations with its Pacific neighbours, Australia, New Zealand, Japan and Fiji. The first three of these provide the bulk of the country's foreign aid. Taiwan and Japan also have specified-period licences to fish in Kiribati's waters. There are three resident diplomatic missions headquartered in Tarawa: the Embassies of the Republic of China (Taiwan) until 2019, replaced by People's Republic of China in 2020; and the High Commissions of Australia and New Zealand. Since 2022, there have been talks of opening a US Embassy. The current U.S. Embassy responsible for Kiribati is located in Suva, Fiji.

In November 1999, Kiribati agreed to allow Japan's National Space Development Agency to lease land on Kiritimati (formerly Christmas Island) for 20 years, on which to build a spaceport. The agreement stipulated that Japan was to pay US$840,000 per year and would also pay for any damage to roads and the environment. A Japanese-built downrange tracking station operates on Kiritimati and an abandoned airfield on the island was designated as the landing strip for a proposed reusable unmanned space shuttle called HOPE-X. HOPE-X, however, was eventually cancelled by Japan in 2003.

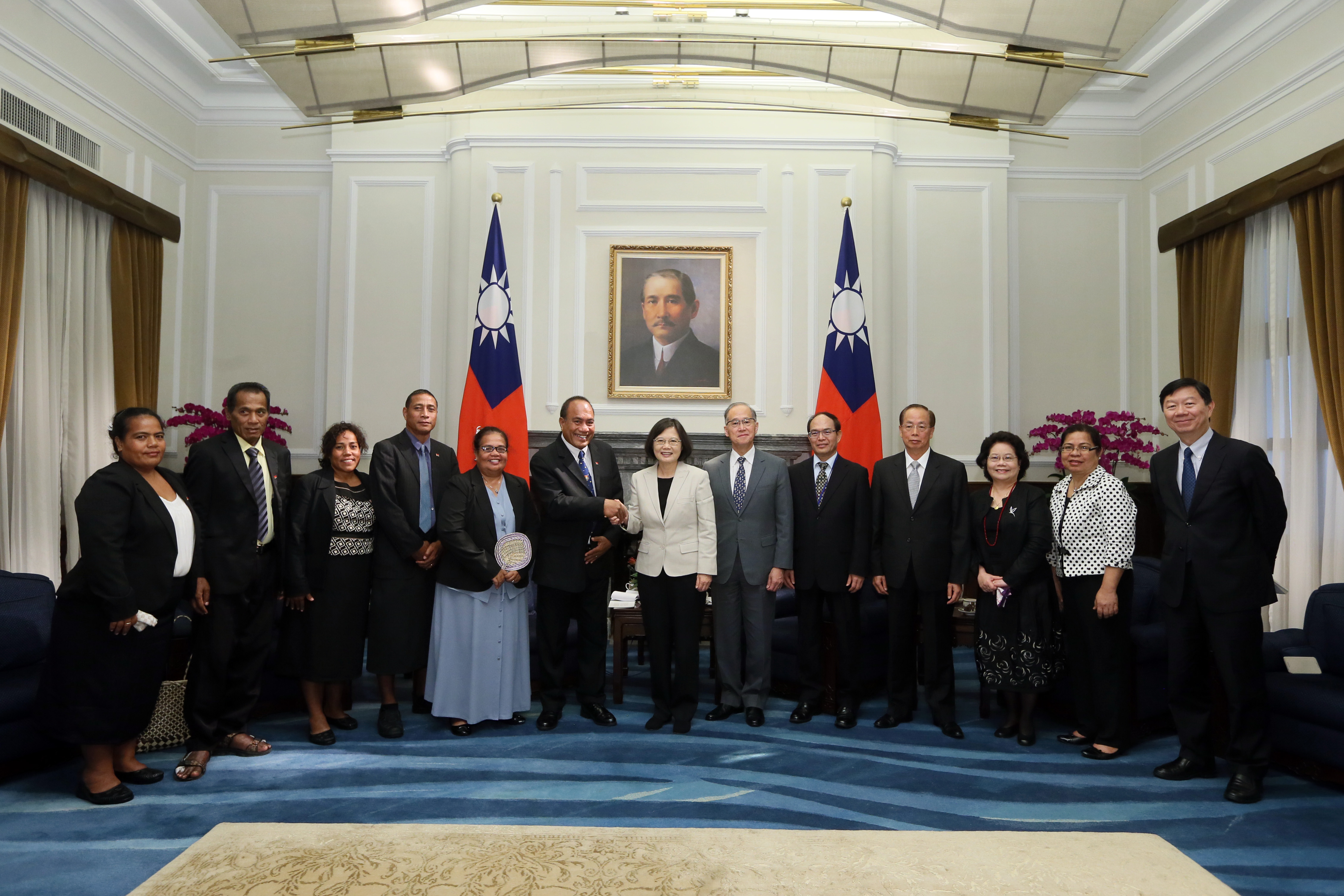
Kiribati President Taneti Maamau meets with Taiwanese President Tsai Ing-wen on 23 May 2016.

As one of the world's most vulnerable nations to the effects of global warming, Kiribati has been an active participant in international diplomatic efforts relating to climate change, most importantly the UNFCCC conferences of the parties (COP). Kiribati is a member of the Alliance of Small Island States (AOSIS), an intergovernmental organisation of low-lying coastal and small island countries. Established in 1990, the main purpose of the alliance is to consolidate the voices of Small Island Developing States (SIDS) to address global warming. AOSIS has been very active from its inception, putting forward the first draft text in the Kyoto Protocol negotiations as early as 1994.

In 2009, President Tong attended the Climate Vulnerable Forum (V11) in the Maldives, with 10 other countries that are vulnerable to climate change, and signed the Bandos Island declaration on 10 November 2009, pledging to show moral leadership and commence greening their economies by voluntarily committing to achieving carbon neutrality.

In November 2010, Kiribati hosted the Tarawa Climate Change Conference (TCCC) to support the president of Kiribati's initiative to hold a consultative forum between vulnerable states and their partners. The conference strove to create an enabling environment for multi-party negotiations under the auspices of the UNFCCC. The conference was a successor event to the Climate Vulnerable Forum. The ultimate objective of TCCC was to reduce the number and intensity of fault lines between parties to the COP process, explore elements of agreement between the parties and thereby to support Kiribati's and other parties' contribution to COP16 held in Cancún, Mexico, from 29 November to 10 December 2010.

In 2013, President Tong spoke of climate-change induced sea level rise as "inevitable". "For our people to survive, then they will have to migrate. Either we can wait for the time when we have to move people en masse or we can prepare them—beginning from now ..." In New York in 2014, per The New Yorker, President Tong told The New York Times that "according to the projections, within this century, the water will be higher than the highest point in our lands". In 2014, President Tong finalised the purchase of a 20 km^{2} (7.7 sq mi) stretch of land on Vanua Levu, one of the larger Fiji islands, 2,000 km away. A move described by Tong as an "absolute necessity" should the country's territory be completely submerged under water.

In 2013, attention was drawn to a claim of a Kiribati man of being a "climate change refugee" under the Convention relating to the Status of Refugees (1951). However, this claim was found to be untenable by the New Zealand High Court. The New Zealand Court of Appeal also rejected the claim in a 2014 decision. On further appeal, the New Zealand Supreme Court confirmed the earlier adverse rulings against the application for refugee status, but rejected the proposition "that environmental degradation resulting from climate change or other natural disasters could never create a pathway into the Refugee Convention or protected person jurisdiction". In 2017, Kiribati signed the UN treaty on the Prohibition of Nuclear Weapons.

On 20 September 2019, the government of Kiribati restored its diplomatic relationship with the People's Republic of China and simultaneously stopped its diplomatic relationship with Taiwan. China offered a 737 aircraft and ferries to Kiribati for the decision, according to Taiwan's foreign minister, Joseph Wu.

==== Peace Corps ====
From 1973 until 2008, almost 500 US Peace Corps volunteers were based on the Islands, as many as 45 in a given year. Activities included assisting in the planning, design and construction of wells, libraries, and other infrastructure, and agricultural, environmental, and community health education. In 2006, volunteer placement was significantly scaled down due to the reduction of consistent air transportation to the outer islands; it was later ended because the associated ability to provide medical care to volunteers could not be assured. In July 2022, US Vice President Harris announced plans to build a new embassy in Kiribati and Tonga and reestablish the Peace Corps presence in the region.

=== Law enforcement and military ===
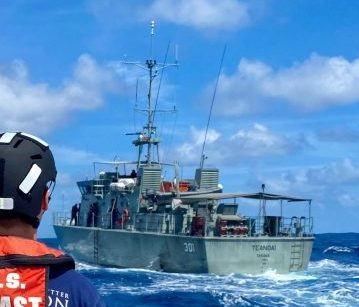
Police vessel RKS Teanoai, in 2019

Law enforcement in Kiribati is carried out by the Kiribati Police Service, which is responsible for all law enforcement and paramilitary duties. There are police posts located on all of the islands. The police have one patrol boat, the Guardian-class patrol boat RKS Teanoai II.

The main prison in Kiribati is located in Betio, named the Walter Betio Prison. There is also a prison in London on Kiritimati.

=== Administrative divisions ===
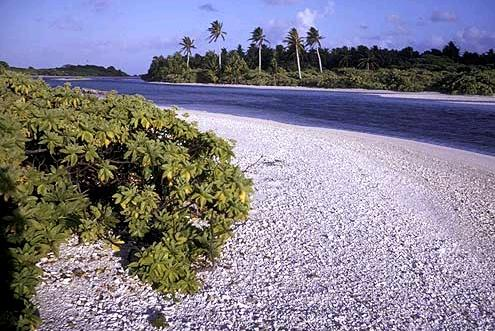
Line Islands: Millennium Island channel between west side of Long Island and Nake Island

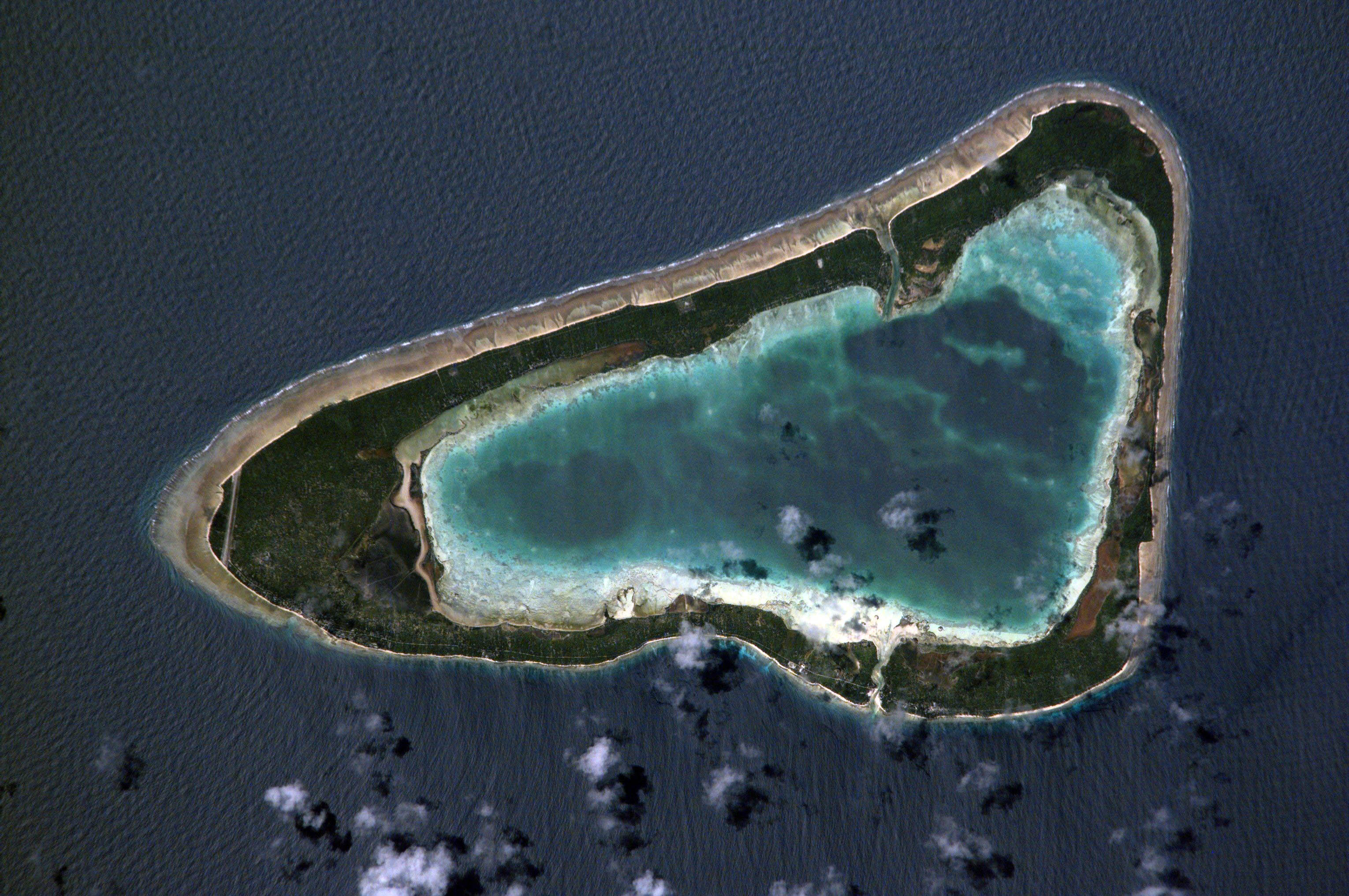
Marakei, North Gilbert Islands

There are 21 inhabited islands in Kiribati. Kiribati can be geographically divided into three archipelagoes or groups of islands, which have no administrative functions. They are:

- Gilbert Islands
- Phoenix Islands, in one of the largest marine protected areas on Earth (was the largest from 2008 to 2010)
- Line Islands

The original districts before independence were:

- Banaba (Ocean Island)
- Tarawa Atoll
- Northern Gilbert Islands
- Central Gilbert Island
- Southern Gilbert Islands
- Line Islands

Four of the former districts (including Tarawa) lie in the Gilbert Islands, where most of the country's population lives. Five of the Line Islands are uninhabited (Malden Island, Starbuck Island, Millennium Island, Vostok Island and Flint Island). The Phoenix Islands are uninhabited except for Kanton, and have no representation. Banaba itself is sparsely inhabited now. There is also a non-elected representative of the Banabans on Rabi Island in Fiji.

Each of the 21 inhabited islands has its own local council that takes care of daily affairs. There is one council for each inhabited island, with two exceptions: Tarawa Atoll has three councils: Betio Town Council, Teinainano Urban Council (TUC) (for the rest of South Tarawa) and Eutan Tarawa Council (ETC) (for North Tarawa); and Tabiteuea has two councils.

== Geography ==
Kiribati with its surrounding EEZs in dark gray, noting the three non-contiguous territories

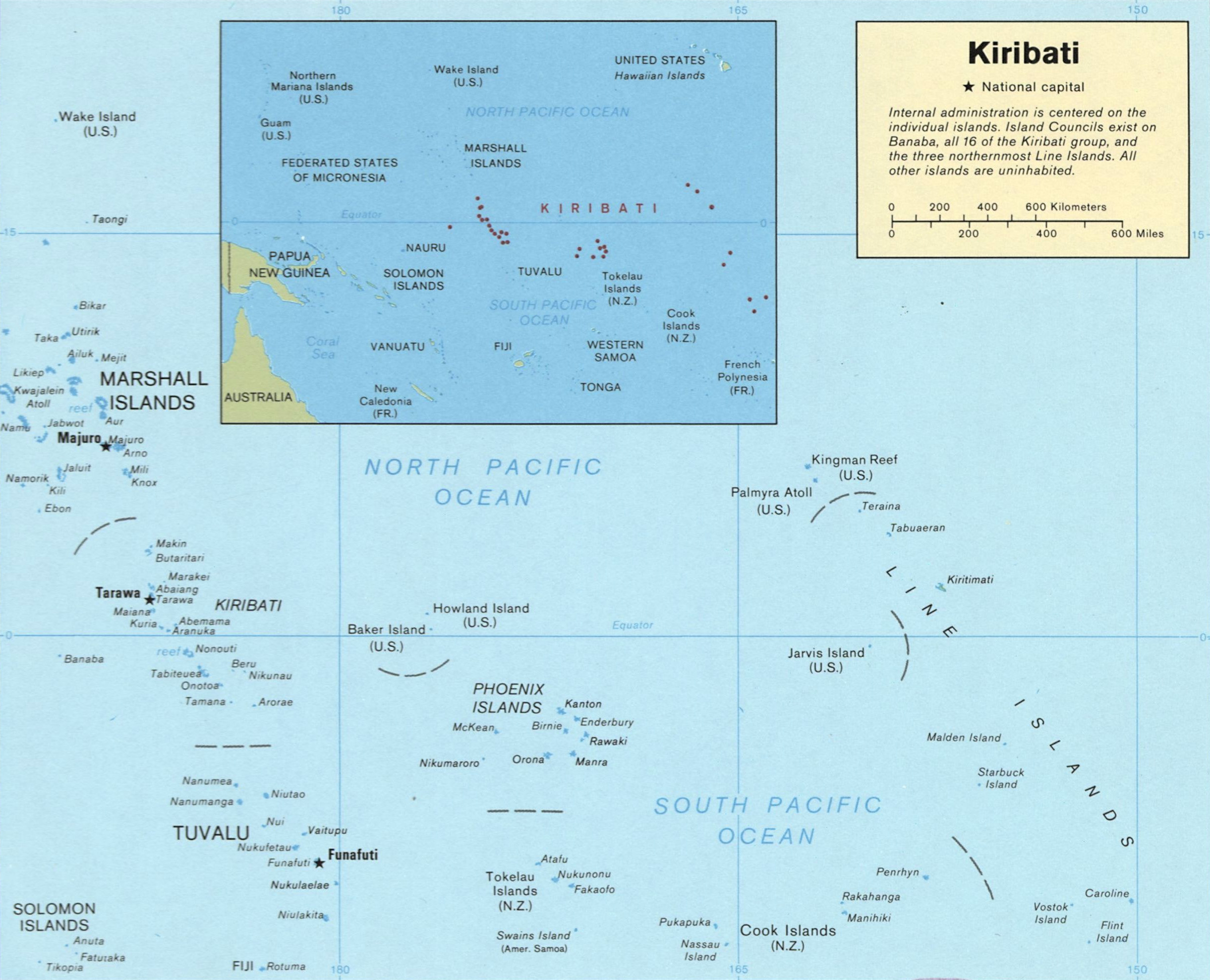
Map of Kiribati

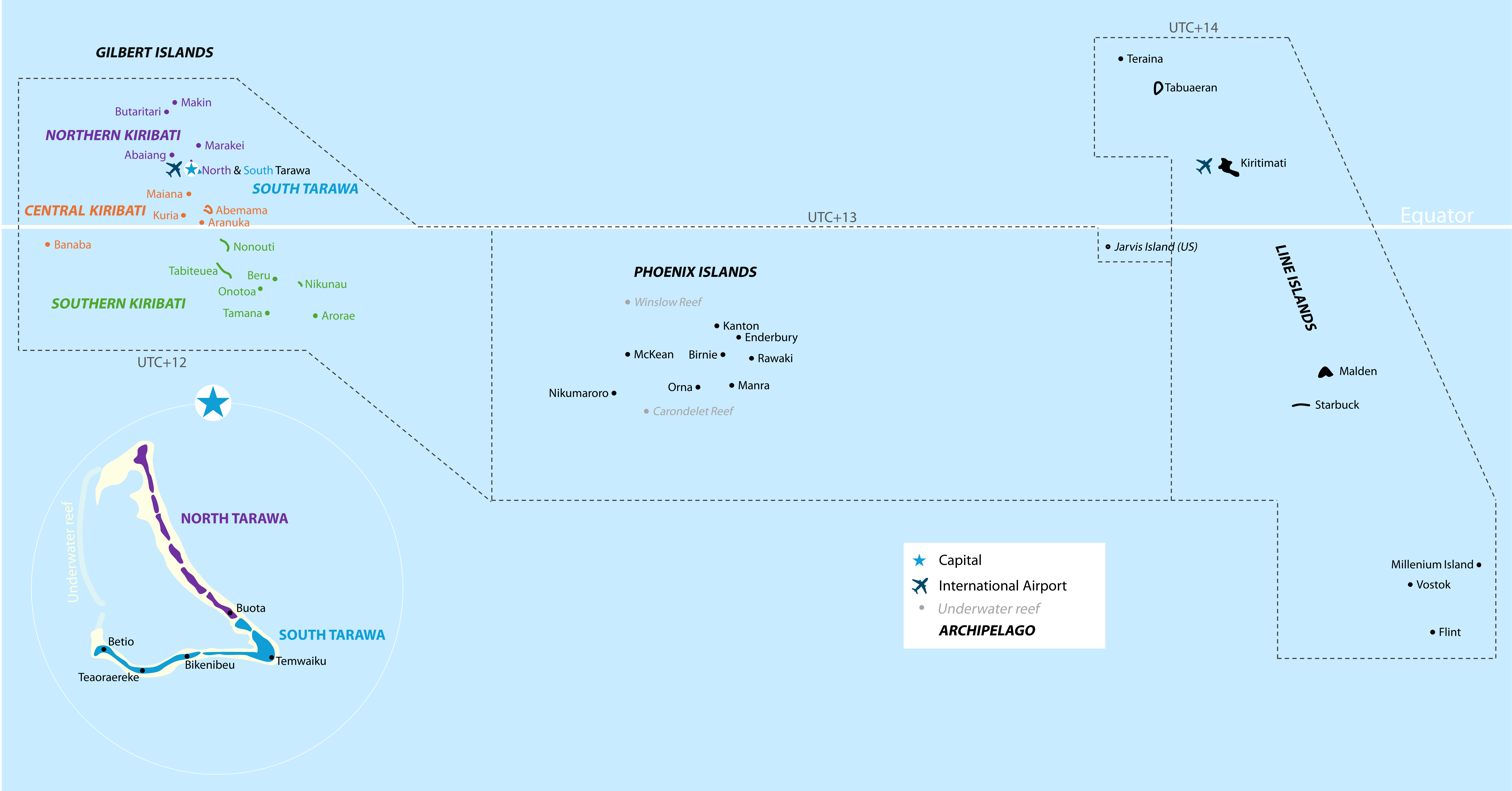
Provinces of Kiribati

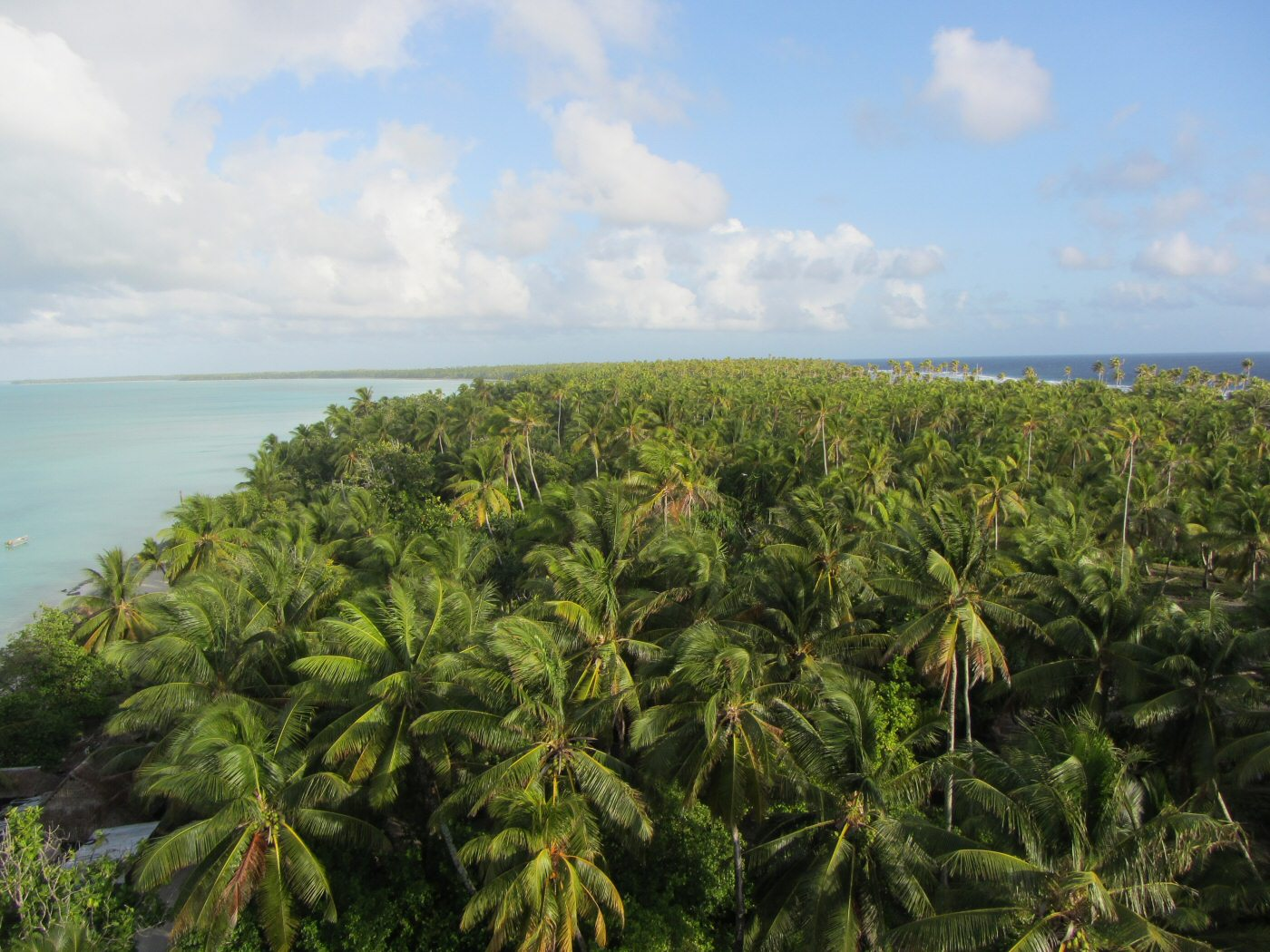
Coconut palms in Abaiang

Kiribati consists of 32 atolls and one solitary island (Banaba), extending into the eastern and western hemispheres, as well as the northern and southern hemispheres. Its extensive exclusive economic zone (EEZ) covers three, non-contiguous, traditional geographic subregions: Banaba (Melanesian-Micronesian area), the Gilbert Islands (Micronesia) and the Line and Phoenix Islands (Polynesia). The groups of islands are:

- Banaba: an isolated island between Nauru and the Gilbert Islands
- Gilbert Islands: sixteen atolls located approximately 1,500 kilometres (932 mi) north of Fiji
- Phoenix Islands: eight atolls and coral islands located approximately 1,800 kilometres (1,118 mi) southeast of the Gilberts
- Line Islands: eight atolls and one reef, located approximately 3,300 kilometres (2,051 mi) east of the Gilberts

Banaba is a raised-coral island. It was once a rich source of phosphates, but was exhausted in mining before independence. The rest of the land in Kiribati consists of the sand and reef rock islets of atolls or coral islands, which rise only one or two meters above sea level.

The soil is thin and calcareous. It has a low water-holding capacity and low organic matter and nutrient content—except for calcium, sodium, and magnesium. Banaba is one of the least suitable places for agriculture in the world.

Kiritimati (previously Christmas Island) in the Line Islands has the largest land area of any atoll in the world. Based on a 1995 realignment of the International Date Line, the Line Islands were the first area to enter into a new year, including the year 2000. For that reason, Caroline Island was renamed Millennium Island in 1997.

=== Environmental issues ===
According to the Pacific Regional Environment Programme (previously South Pacific Regional Environment Programme), two small uninhabited Kiribati islets, Tebua Tarawa and Abanuea, disappeared underwater in 1999. The sea level at Christmas Island, in the 50 years between 1972 and 2022, has risen 5 cm (2.0 in). The United Nations Intergovernmental Panel on Climate Change predicts that sea levels will rise by approximately 50 cm (20 in) by 2100 due to global warming. Due to the rises in sea levels, several islands risk being submerged. Additionally, further rises would cause increased soil salination in the arable areas.

The exposure of Kiribati to changes in sea levels is exacerbated by the Pacific decadal oscillation, which is a climate switch phenomenon that results in changes from periods of La Niña to periods of El Niño. This has an effect on sea levels. For example, in 2000, there was a switch from periods of downward pressure of El Niño on sea levels to an upward pressure of La Niña on sea levels, which upward pressure causes more frequent and higher high tide levels. The Perigean spring tide (often called a king tide) can result in seawater flooding low-lying areas of the islands of Kiribati.

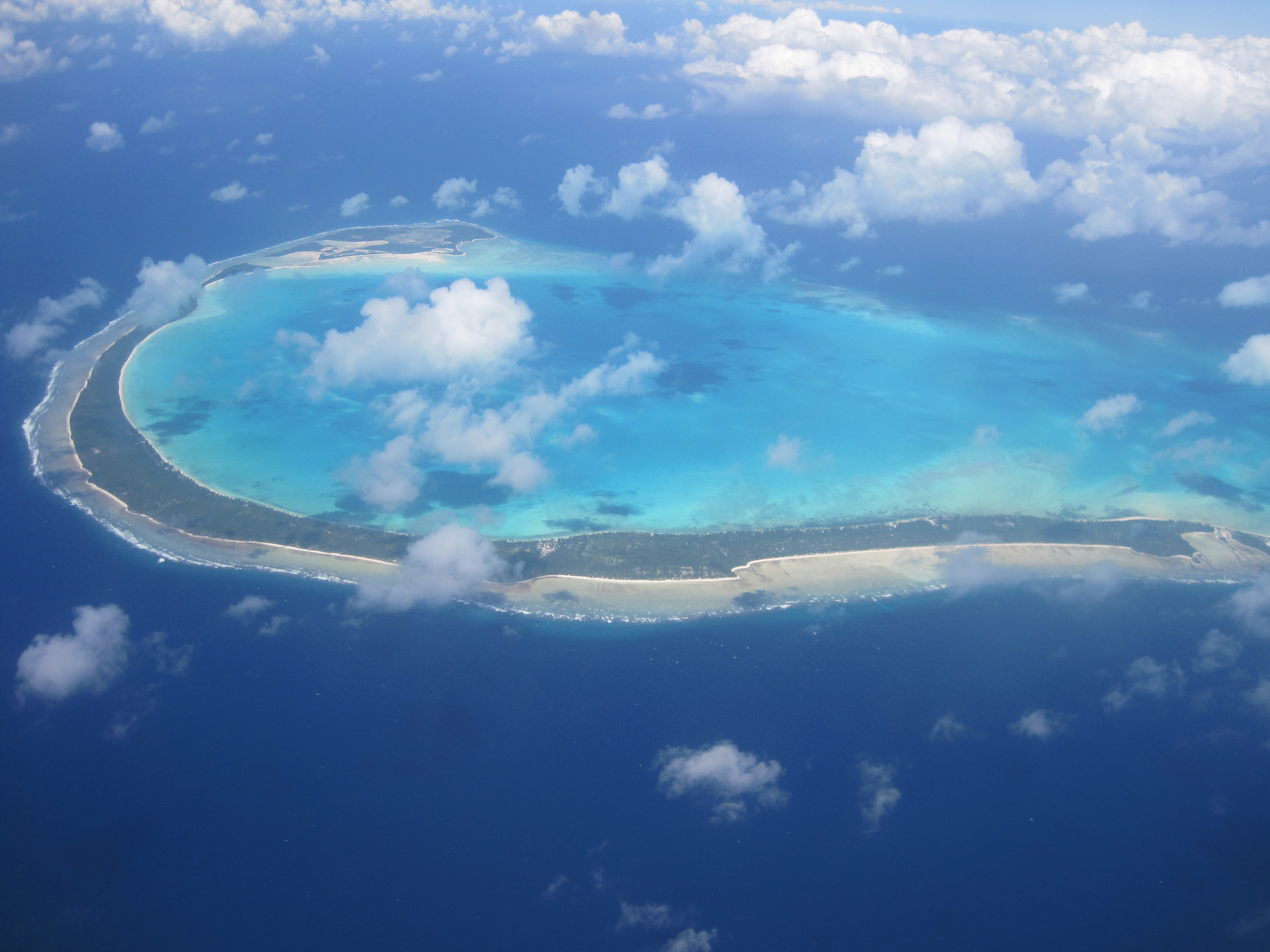
South of Onotoa Atoll

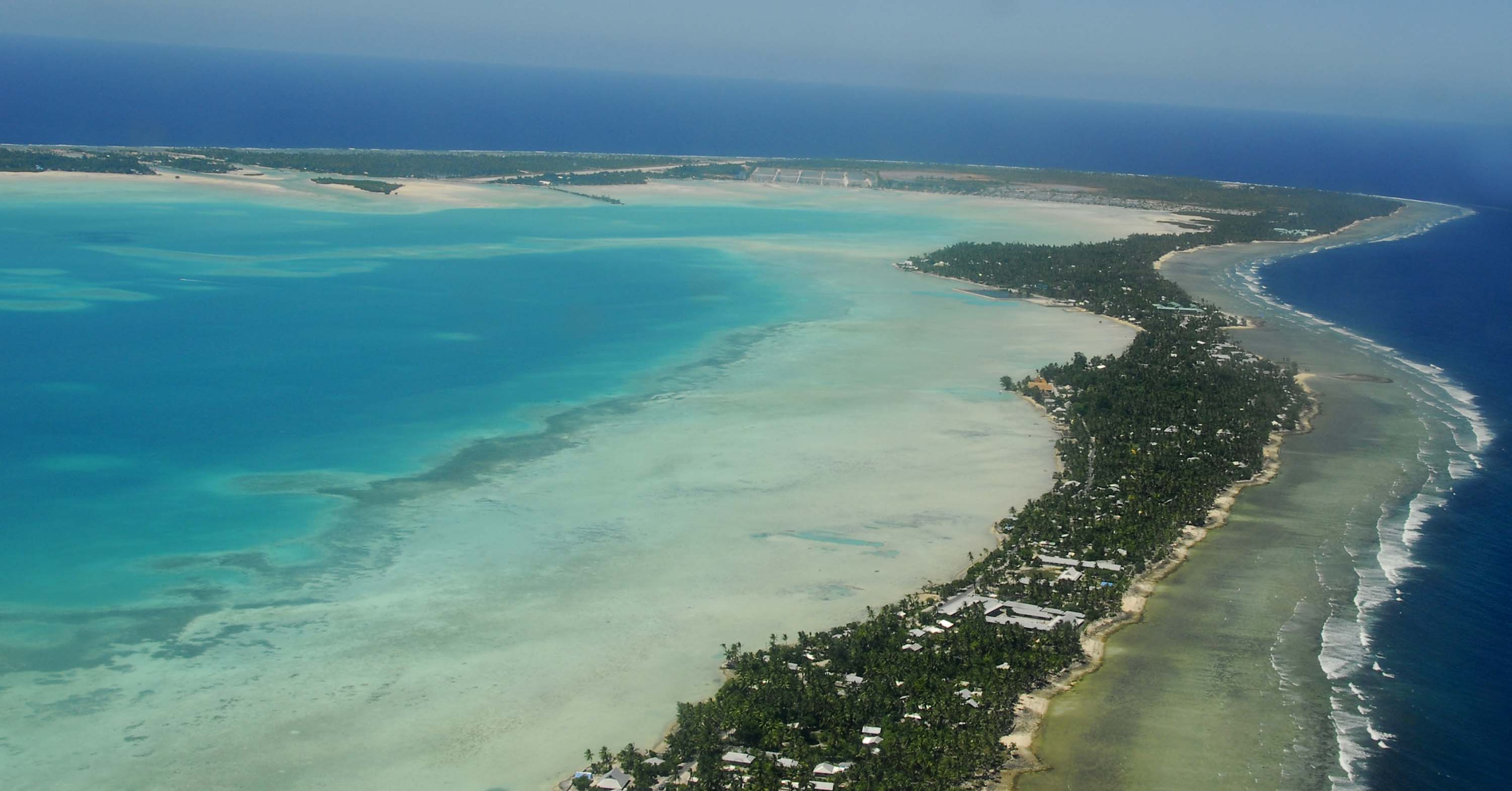
Tarawa Atoll

The atolls and reef islands can respond to changes in sea-level. Paul Kench at the University of Auckland in New Zealand and Arthur Webb at the South Pacific Applied Geoscience Commission in Fiji released a study in 2010 on the dynamic response of atolls and reef islands in the central Pacific. Kiribati was mentioned in the study, and Webb and Kench found that the three major urbanised islands in Kiribati—Betio, Bairiki and Nanikai—increased by 30% (36 hectares), 16.3% (5.8 hectares) and 12.5% (0.8 hectares), respectively.

The study by Paul Kench and Arthur Webb recognises that the islands are extremely vulnerable to sea level rise, and concluded that: "This study did not measure vertical growth of the island surface nor does it suggest there is any change in the height of the islands. Since land height has not changed, the vulnerability of the greater part of the land area of each island to submergence due to sea level rise is also unchanged and these low-lying atolls remain immediately and extremely vulnerable to inundation or sea water flooding."

The Climate Change in the Pacific Report of 2011 describes Kiribati as having a low risk of cyclones. In March 2015 Kiribati experienced flooding and destruction of seawalls and coastal infrastructure as the result of Cyclone Pam, a Category 5 cyclone that devastated Vanuatu. Kiribati remains exposed to the risk that cyclones can strip the low-lying islands of their vegetation and soil.

Gradual sea-level rise also allows for coral polyp activity to raise the atolls with the sea level. However, if the increase in sea level occurs at a rate faster than coral growth, or if polyp activity is damaged by ocean acidification, then the resilience of the atolls and reef islands is less certain.

The Human Rights Measurement Initiative finds that the climate crisis has worsened human rights conditions moderately (4.8 out of 6) in Kiribati. Human rights experts reported that the climate crisis has compromised access to food and clean water, as well as women's rights, housing security and cultural integrity.

The Kiribati Adaptation Program (KAP), started in 2003, is a US$5.5 million initiative that was originally enacted by the national government of Kiribati with the support of the Global Environment Facility (GEF), the World Bank, the United Nations Development Program, and the Japanese government. Australia later joined the coalition, donating US$1.5 million to the effort. The program aims to take place over six years, supporting measures that reduce Kiribati's vulnerability to the effects of climate change and sea level rise by raising awareness of climate change, assessing and protecting available water resources, and managing inundation. At the start of the Adaptation Program, representatives from each of the inhabited atolls identified key climatic changes that had taken place over the past 20–40 years and proposed coping mechanisms to deal with these changes under four categories of urgency of need. The program is now focusing on the country's most vulnerable sectors in the most highly populated areas. Initiatives include improving water supply management in and around Tarawa; coastal management protection measures such as mangrove re-plantation and protection of public infrastructure; strengthening laws to reduce coastal erosion; and population settlement planning to reduce personal risks.

The government has taken specific action to ensure food security, as sea level rise, drought, and overfishing have created food and water shortages. This has involved diversifying food sources and ensuring existing resources are managed sustainably.

The issue of plastic pollution has also been a key challenge for Kiribati as it hurts both its marine biodiversity and its economy that relies primarily on fisheries; it also impairs prospects for a tourism industry. As a result, the government of Kiribati, more specifically the Environment and Conservation Division (ECD) which forms part of the Kiribati Government's Ministry of Environment, Lands and Agricultural Development, has made efforts to tackle this issue nationally through environment acts and state policy papers. To a further extent, it has also recognized the global nature of plastic pollution, and consequently, has promoted international cooperation and multilateral solutions. This is notably observable during the current negotiations of the Global Plastic Pollution Treaty planned to be finally drafted by the end of 2024.

=== Climate ===
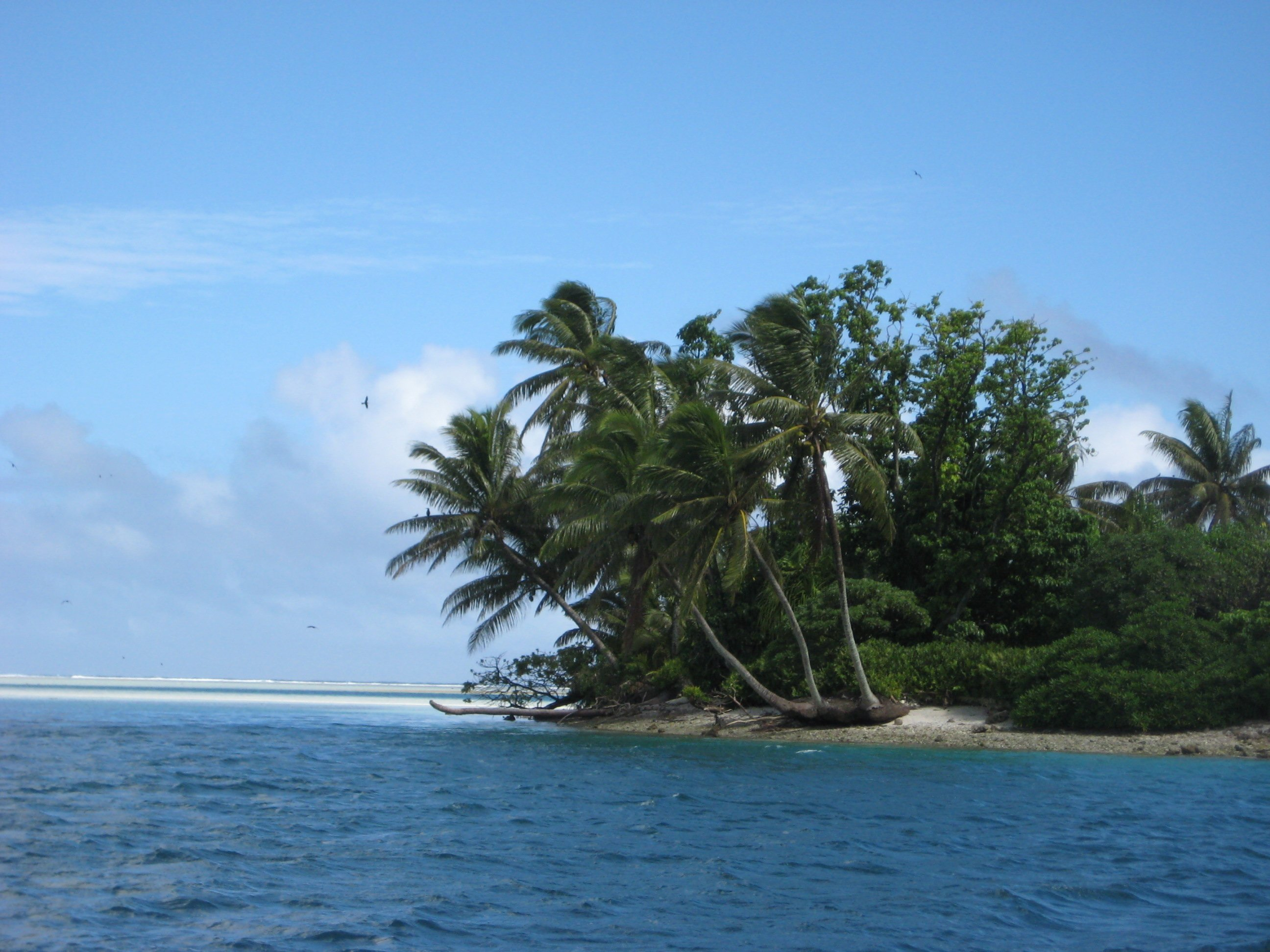
A tropical islet with palm fronds oriented in the direction of the prevailing winds

Kiribati has a tropical rainforest climate (Af). From April to October, there are predominant northeastern winds and stable temperatures close to 30 °C (86 °F). From November to April, western gales bring rain.

The Kiribati wet season (te Auu-Meang), also known as the tropical cyclone (TC) (te Angibuaka) season, starts from November to April every year. Kiribati therefore typically experiences more extreme weather events associated with tropical disturbances or tropical cyclones during te Auu-Meang. Tropical cyclones rarely develop or pass along the equator where Kiribati is located, but Kiribati has historically been impacted by distant tropical cyclones. The impacts were observed while the systems were still in their development stages (Tropical Low/disturbance) or even before they reached Tropical cyclone category.

The fair season starts when Ten Rimwimata (Antares) appears in the sky after sunset, from May to November, when more gentle winds and currents and less rain. Then towards December, when Nei Auti (Pleiades) replaces Antares, the season of sudden westerly winds and more heavy rain discourages any far travel from island to island.

Kiribati does not experience cyclones, but effects may occasionally be experienced during cyclone seasons affecting nearby Pacific Island countries such as Fiji.

Precipitation varies significantly between islands. For example, the annual average is 3,000 mm (120 in) in the north and 500 mm (20 in) in the south of the Gilbert Islands. Most of these islands are in the dry belt of the equatorial oceanic climatic zone and experience prolonged droughts.

Climate data for Tarawa (Köppen Af)
Month	Jan	Feb	Mar	Apr	May	Jun	Jul	Aug	Sep	Oct	Nov	Dec	Year
Record high °C (°F)	35.0 (95.0)	33.0 (91.4)	35.0 (95.0)	34.5 (94.1)	34.5 (94.1)	33.5 (92.3)	34.5 (94.1)	34.5 (94.1)	34.5 (94.1)	35.0 (95.0)	35.0 (95.0)	35.0 (95.0)	35.0 (95.0)
Mean daily maximum °C (°F)	30.7 (87.3)	30.6 (87.1)	30.7 (87.3)	30.7 (87.3)	30.8 (87.4)	30.8 (87.4)	30.9 (87.6)	31.0 (87.8)	31.1 (88.0)	31.2 (88.2)	31.3 (88.3)	30.9 (87.6)	30.9 (87.6)
Daily mean °C (°F)	28.2 (82.8)	28.1 (82.6)	28.1 (82.6)	28.2 (82.8)	28.4 (83.1)	28.3 (82.9)	28.2 (82.8)	28.3 (82.9)	28.4 (83.1)	28.6 (83.5)	28.5 (83.3)	28.2 (82.8)	28.3 (82.9)
Mean daily minimum °C (°F)	25.3 (77.5)	25.3 (77.5)	25.2 (77.4)	25.3 (77.5)	25.5 (77.9)	25.3 (77.5)	25.1 (77.2)	25.2 (77.4)	25.3 (77.5)	25.4 (77.7)	25.4 (77.7)	25.3 (77.5)	25.3 (77.5)
Record low °C (°F)	21.5 (70.7)	22.5 (72.5)	22.5 (72.5)	22.5 (72.5)	21.0 (69.8)	21.0 (69.8)	21.0 (69.8)	21.5 (70.7)	22.5 (72.5)	22.0 (71.6)	22.5 (72.5)	22.0 (71.6)	21.0 (69.8)
Average precipitation mm (inches)	271 (10.7)	218 (8.6)	204 (8.0)	184 (7.2)	158 (6.2)	155 (6.1)	168 (6.6)	138 (5.4)	120 (4.7)	110 (4.3)	115 (4.5)	212 (8.3)	2,052 (80.8)
Average precipitation days (≥ 0.3 mm)	15	12	14	15	15	14	16	18	15	11	10	17	172
Average relative humidity (%)	81	80	81	82	81	81	80	79	77	77	79	81	80
Mean monthly sunshine hours	220.1	192.1	207.7	201.0	229.4	219.0	229.4	257.3	243.0	260.4	240.0	189.1	2,688.5
Mean daily sunshine hours	7.1	6.8	6.7	6.7	7.4	7.3	7.4	8.3	8.1	8.4	8.0	6.1	7.4
Source: Deutscher Wetterdienst

=== Ecology ===
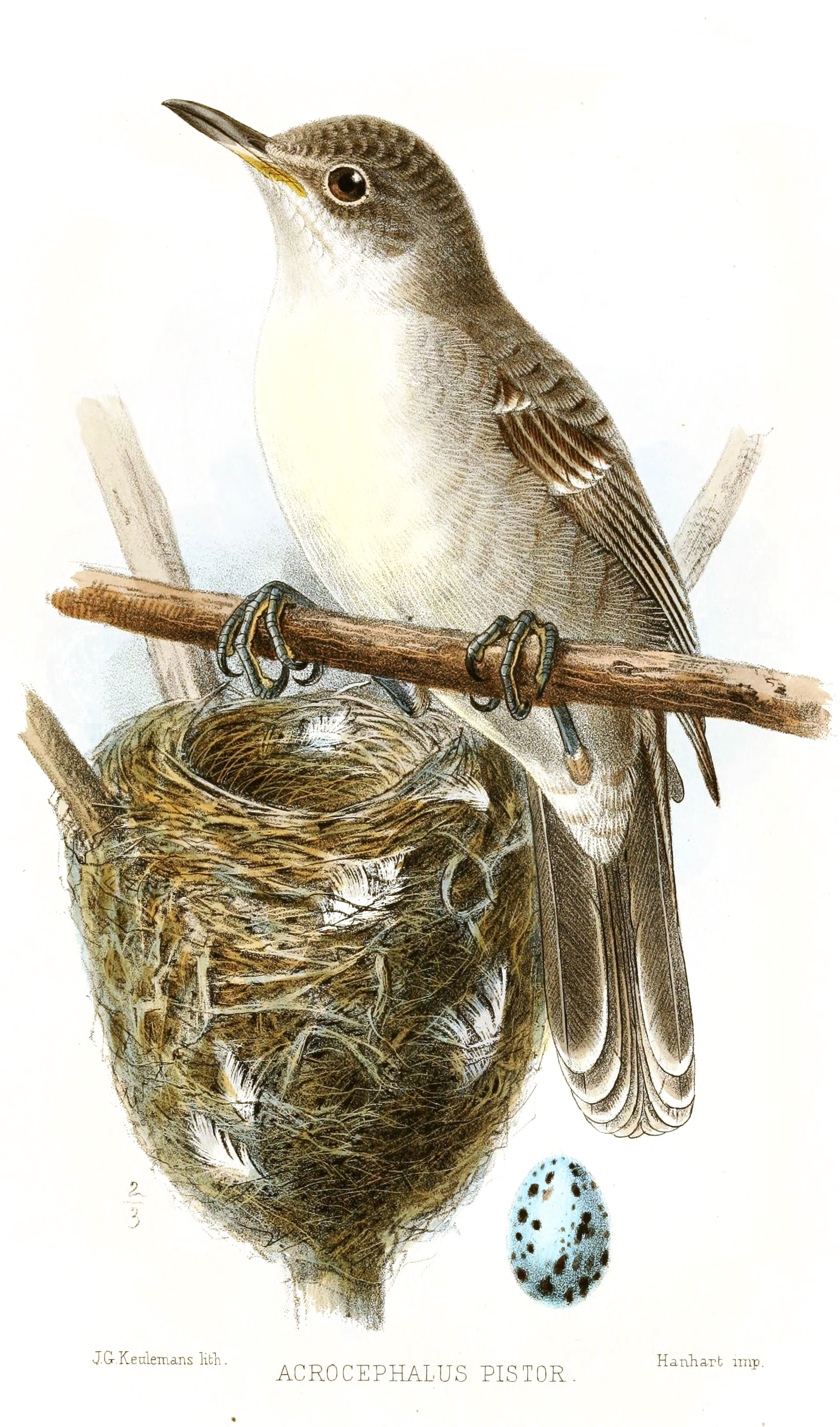
The bokikokiko (Acrocephalus aequinoctialis) is the only land wildlife species endemic to Kiribati.

Kiribati contains three ecosystems: Central Polynesian tropical moist forests, Eastern Micronesia tropical moist forests, and Western Polynesian tropical moist forests.

Because of the relatively young geological age of the islands and atolls and the high level of soil salination, the flora of Kiribati is somewhat unhealthy. The Gilbert Islands contain about 83 indigenous and 306 introduced plants, whereas the corresponding numbers for Line and Phoenix Islands are 67 and 283. None of these species are endemic, and about half of the indigenous ones have a limited distribution and have become endangered or nearly extinct due to human activities such as phosphate mining.

Coconut, pandanus palms and breadfruit trees are the most common wild plants, whereas the five most cultivated crops but the traditional Babai, Cyrtosperma merkusii, are imported Chinese cabbage, pumpkin, tomato, watermelon and cucumber. Over eighty percent of the population participates in either farming or fishing.

Seaweed farming is an important part of the economy, with two major species Eucheuma alvarezii and Eucheuma spinosium introduced to the local lagoons from the Philippines in 1977. It competes with a collection of the black-lipped pearl oyster (Pinctada margaritifera) and shellfish, which are dominated by the strombid gastropod (Strombus luhuanus) and Anadara cockles (Anadara uropigimelana), whereas the stocks of the giant clam (Tridacna gigas) have been largely exhausted.

Kiribati has a few land mammals, none being indigenous or endemic. They include the Polynesian rat (Rattus exulans), dogs, cats and pigs. Among the 75 bird species, the Bokikokiko (Acrocephalus aequinoctialis) is endemic to Kiritimati.

There are 600–800 species of inshore and pelagic finfish, some 200 species of corals and about 1000 species of shellfish. Fishing mostly targets the family Scombridae, particularly the skipjack tuna and yellowfin tuna as well as flying fish (Cypselurus spp.).

Dogs were already accompanying the first inhabitants but were re-introduced by European settlers: they have continued to grow in numbers and are roaming in traditional packs, particularly around South Tarawa.

== Economy ==
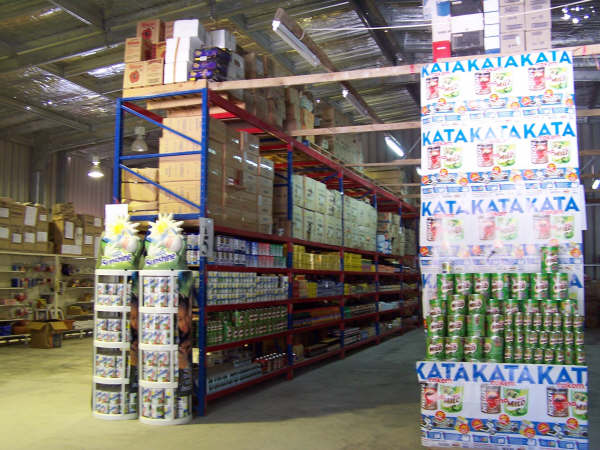
A Bosj's warehouse in Kiribati

Kiribati has few natural resources. Commercially viable phosphate deposits on Banaba were exhausted at the time of independence. Copra and fish now represent the bulk of production and exports. Kiribati has the lowest GDP of any sovereign state in Oceania, and is considered one of the least developed countries in the world.

Kiribati gets a large portion of its income from abroad. Examples include fishing licences, development assistance, workers' remittances, especially the seafarers issued from Marine Training Centre, and a few tourists. Given Kiribati's limited domestic production capacity, the country imports most manufactured goods and many essential foodstuffs, and relies on external sources of income to finance these imports.

The economy of Kiribati benefits from international development assistance programs. The multilateral donors providing development assistance in 2009 were the European Union (A$9 million), the United Nations Development Programme (A$3.7 million), UNICEF, and the World Health Organization (A$100,000). The bilateral donors providing development assistance in 2009 were Australia (A$11 million), Japan (A$2 million), New Zealand (A$6.6 million), Taiwan (A$10.6 million), and other donors providing A$16.2 million, including technical assistance grants from the Asian Development Bank.

The major donors in 2010/2011 were Australia (A$15 million), Taiwan (A$11 million); New Zealand (A$6 million), the World Bank (A$4 million) and the Asian Development Bank.

In 1956, Gilbert and Ellice Islands established a sovereign wealth fund to act as a store of wealth for the country's earnings from phosphate mining. In 2008, the Revenue Equalization Reserve Fund was valued at US$400 million. The RERF assets declined from A$637 million (420% of GDP) in 2007 to A$570.5 million (350% of GDP) in 2009 as the result of the 2008 financial crisis and exposure to failed Icelandic banks. In addition, drawdowns were made by the government of Kiribati to finance budgetary shortfalls during this period.

In May 2011, an IMF country report found that, "After two years of contraction, the economy recovered in the second half of 2010 and inflation pressure dissipated. It is estimated to have grown by 1.75% for the year. Despite a weather-related drop in copra production, private sector activity appears to have picked up, especially in retail. Tourist arrivals rebounded by 20% compared to 2009, although from a very low base. Despite the rise in world food and fuel prices, inflation has bounced from 2008 crisis-highs into negative territory, reflecting the strong appreciation of the Australian dollar, which is used as the domestic currency, and a decline in the world price of rice. Credit growth in the overall economy declined in 2009 as economic activity stalled. But it started to pick up in the second half of 2010 as the recovery gained traction".

A major Australian bank, ANZ, maintains a presence in Kiribati with a number of branches and ATM units.

=== Ornamental fish ===
Kiribati is a major exporter of hand-caught ornamental fish. There are eight licensed operators based on Kiritimati (Christmas Island). At the end of 2005, the number of pet fish exported was 110,000. All operators have a land-based facility but fish are kept in containers on the reef until the day before the shipment. This is to reduce the running cost and the mortality of pet fish to be exported. The flame angelfish (Centropyge loriculus) is the major species exported.

=== Transport ===
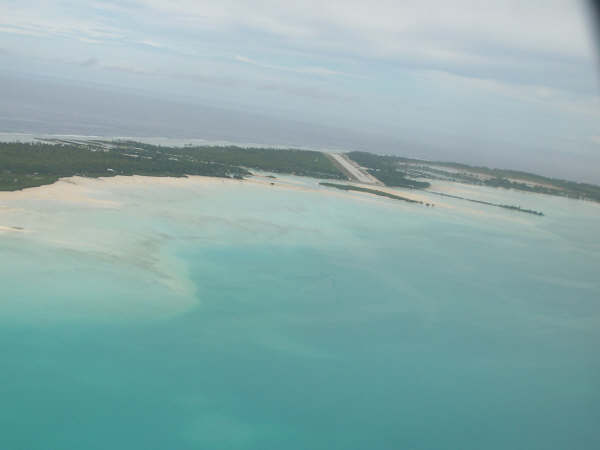
Bonriki International Airport

Kiribati has had two domestic airlines: Air Kiribati and Coral Sun Airways. Both airlines are based in Tarawa's Bonriki International Airport and serve destinations across the Gilbert Islands and Line Islands only: Banaba and the Phoenix Islands are not served by the domestic carriers. The Coral Sun Airways airline flies from Bonriki international airport on Tarawa to the islands of Abaiang, Abemama, Aranuka, Arorae, Beru, Butaritari, Kuria, Makin, Marakei, Onotoa, Nonouti, Nikunau, Tabiteuea & Tamana.

Cassidy International Airport on Kiritimati has an international service provided by Fiji Airways: Nadi to Cassidy Airport and then to Honolulu.

== Communications and media ==
Communications between the islands of Kiribati have been particularly challenging, with the islands spanning across hundreds of miles north and south of the equator. Communication is primarily conducted by radio and print media. TV Kiribati Ltd was owned by the government and operated between 2004 and mid-2012, but could not reach all of the islands. Radio Kiribati, based on Tarawa and operated by the government's Broadcasting and Publications Authority (BPA) on 1440 kHz AM, is the only form of mass media that reaches all the major islands. Transmission hours are limited and local content in Gilbertese is supplemented by English summaries and BBC News. The BPA and a private broadcaster also operate FM stations accessible on Tarawa.

Inter-island communications for many years relied on a centralized shortwave radio network operated by Telecom Services Kiribati, Ltd (TSKL) based in each Island's Council Headquarters. Numerous issues, including low availability, maintenance, privacy, and only one per island led TSKL to adopt satellite-based telephones. However, the system is more expensive and still only located at Council Headquarters.

Print weeklies in Gilbertese include the Te Uekara published by the government, Te Mauri published by the Kiribati Protestant Church, and the Kiribati Independent, published from Auckland as well as the Kiribati Newstar, published in English.

In December 2019, SpaceX launched the Kacific1 broadband satellite that provides 100 Mbit/s mobile and broadband service to 25 countries throughout to the Asia-Pacific region including Kiribati. Three of the satellite's 56 spot beams provide overlapping coverage of the Gilbert Islands and Tuvalu; however, the more eastern regions of the country, the Phoenix and Line Islands, are outside of the satellite's coverage.

The Southern Cross NEXT cable system, which entered service in July 2022, connects the US to Australia and provides service to eastern part of Kiribati (Kiritimati island) through the 234-mile (377 km) Kiritimati Branch with one fibre pair. The network, which is an upgrade to the existing Southern Cross Cable, also connects to Samoa, Fiji, and New Zealand.

In June 2021, the World Bank-backed procurement for the East Micronesian Cable system was cancelled due to security concerns. The undersea fiberoptic system, which would have originated in Guam, was "designed to improve the communications in the island nations of Nauru, Kiribati and Federated States of Micronesia (FSM)." In January 2023, ministers from the three Pacific island nations signed a joint communiqué for moving forward with the stalled project. Funded by the U.S., Japan and Australia the project is valued at $70 million. In early 2023, it was reported that Kiribati became the first Pacific island country to receive Starlink services.

== Demographics ==
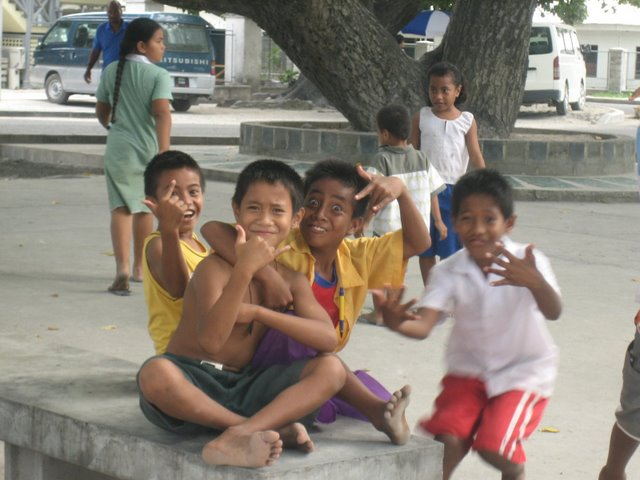
I-Kiribati children in South Tarawa

The November 2020 census showed a population of 119,940. About 90% lived in the Gilbert Islands, with 52.9% of them on South Tarawa, including Betio, the biggest township.

Until recently, people lived mostly in villages with populations between 50 and 3,000 on the outer islands. Most houses are made of materials obtained from coconut and pandanus trees. Frequent droughts and infertile soil hinder reliable large-scale agriculture, so the islanders have largely turned to the sea for livelihood and subsistence. Most are outrigger sailors and fishermen. Copra plantations serve as a second source of employment. In recent years, large numbers of citizens have moved to the more urban island capital of Tarawa, where Betio is the largest town and South Tarawa reunites larger towns like Bikenibeu or Teaoraereke. South Tarawa's 2024 population is now estimated at 69,710. In 1978, the population of South Tarawa was 17,921.

=== Ethnicity ===
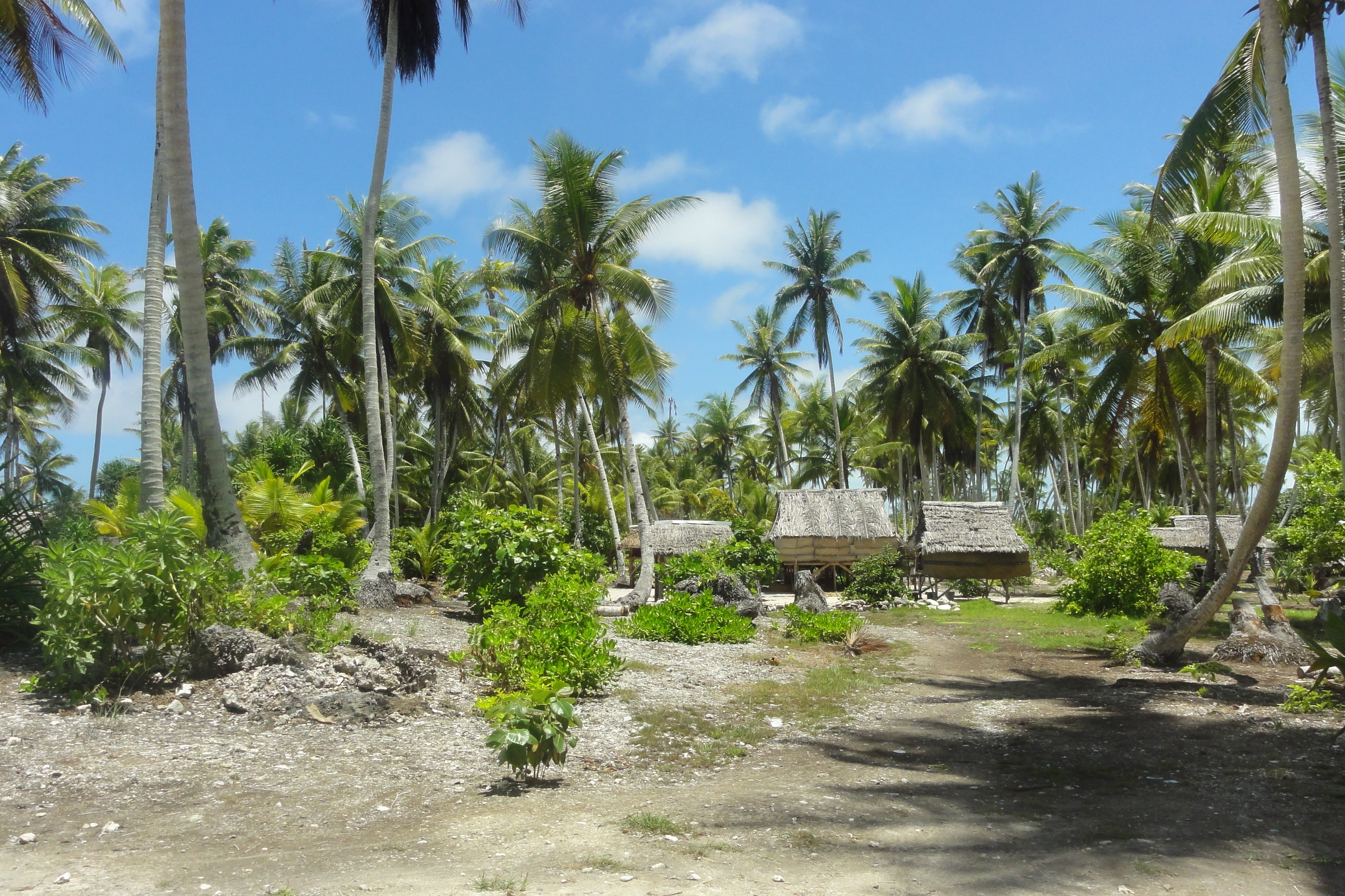
Village in Kiribati

Ethnic groups in Kiribati
Ethnic groups	percent
I-Kiribati	95.71%
Part I-Kiribati	3.76%
Tuvalu	0.24%
Other	1.8%

The native people of Kiribati are called I-Kiribati. Ethnically, the I-Kiribati are Micronesians, a sub-ethnicity of Austronesians. Recent archaeological evidence indicates that Austronesians originally settled the islands thousands of years ago. Around the 14th century, Fijians, Samoans, and Tongans invaded the islands, thus diversifying the ethnic range and introducing Polynesian linguistic traits. Intermarriage among all ancestral groups, however, has led to a population reasonably homogeneous in appearance and traditions.

=== Languages ===
The people of Kiribati speak the Gilbertese language, an Oceanic language. English is the other official language, but it is not used very often outside the island capital of Tarawa. It is, however, more likely that some English words are mixed in their use with Gilbertese. Older generations of I-Kiribati tend to use more complicated versions of the language. Several words in Gilbertese have been adopted from European settlers, for instance, kamea is one of the Gilbertese words for 'dog', kiri being the Oceanic one, which has its origins in the I-Kiribati people hearing the European settlers saying "come here" to their dogs, and adopting that as kamea.

Many other loanwords have been adopted (e.g. buun 'spoon', moko 'smoke', beeki 'pig', batoro 'bottle'), though some typical Gilbertese words are quite common, even for Western objects like wanikiba 'airplane' (lit. 'the flying canoe'), rebwerebwe 'motorbike' (lit. 'for the motor noise'), and kauniwae 'shoes' (lit. 'the cow for the feet').

=== Religion ===
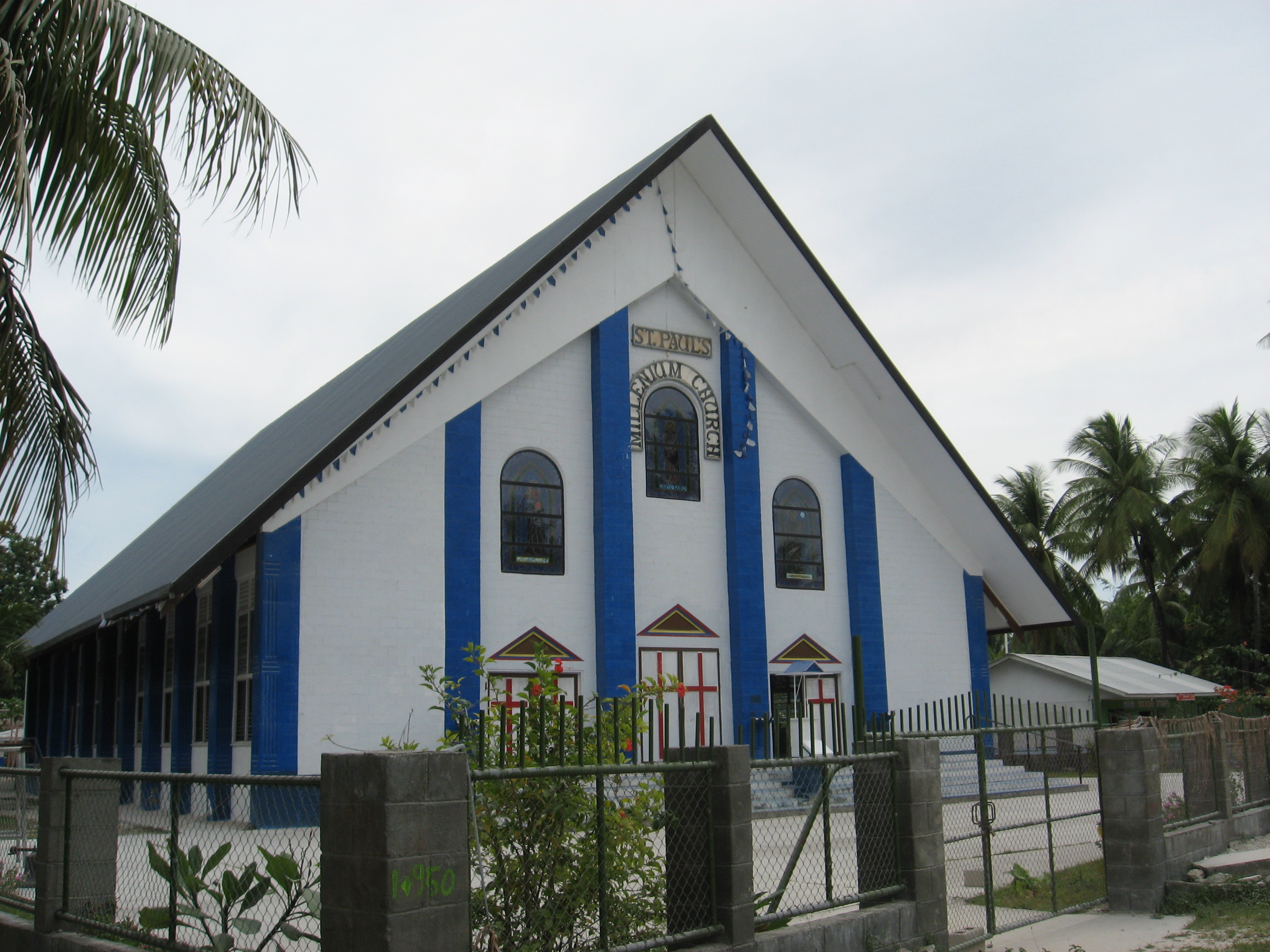
Catholic Church in Betio

Christianity is the major religion in Kiribati, having been lately introduced by missionaries, because of its remoteness and the absence of any significant European presence until the latter half of the 19th century. The population is predominantly Roman Catholic (58.9%), with two main Protestant denominations (Kiribati Protestant Church 8.4% and Kiribati Uniting Church 21.2%) accounting for 29.6%. The Church of Jesus Christ of Latter-day Saints (5.6%), Baháʼí Faith (2.1%), Seventh-day Adventist Church (2.1%), Pentecostals, Jehovah's Witnesses, and other small faiths together account for less than 2% (2020 census).

=== Health ===
Prevalence of obesity in the adult population, top countries (2016), Kiribati has the seventh highest rate in the world.

The Gilbert Islands where 90% of the Kiribati population live, boast some of the highest population densities in the Pacific, rivalling cities like Hong Kong or Singapore without any skyscrapers or other forms of conventional high-density housing. This overcrowding produces a great amount of pollution, worsening the quality and length of life. Due to insufficient sanitation and water filtration systems, worsened by the fragility of the water lens of the atolls and by climate change, only about 66% have access to clean water. Waterborne diseases grow at record levels throughout the islands. Poor sanitation has led to an increase in cases of conjunctivitis, diarrhoea, dysentery, and fungal infections. Kiribati is the country with the third highest prevalence of smoking in the world, with 54–57% of the population reported as smokers. Due to this and other "lifestyle diseases", such as type 2 diabetes, there has been a drastic spike in amputations on the islands, doubling in a few years.

As a consequence, the population of Kiribati has a quite low life expectancy at birth of 68.46 years. Even if this data is of only 66.9 years, provided elsewhere, Kiribati ranks last in life expectancy out of the 20 nations of Oceania. This life expectancy is 64.3 for males, and 69.5 for females and there is an infant mortality rate of 41 deaths per 1,000 live births. Tuberculosis has a small presence in the country, with 365 cases per 100,000 a year. Government expenditure on health was at US$268 per capita (PPP) in 2006. In 1990–2007, there were 23 physicians per 100,000 persons. Since the arrival of Cuban doctors in 2006, the infant mortality rate has decreased significantly.

Most health problems are related to consumption of semi-raw seafood, limited food storage facilities, and bacterial contamination of fresh water supplies. In the early 2000s, between 1 and 7% of the population, depending on the island, were annually treated for food poisoning in a hospital. Modernization and cross-cultural exchange of the late 20th century brought new issues of unhealthy diet and lifestyle, heavy smoking, especially among the young, and external infections, including HIV/AIDS.

Fresh water remains a concern of Kiribati – during the dry season (Aumaiaki), water has been drilled for instead of using rain water tanks. In recent years, there has been a longer than usual Aumaikai season resulting in additional water having to be drilled from beneath the water table. This has introduced water-borne illnesses, compounding the health problems within Kiribati.

The Human Rights Measurement Initiative finds that Kiribati is fulfilling 77.2% of what it should be fulfilling for the right to health based on its level of income. When looking at the right to health with respect to children, Kiribati achieves 93.8% of what is expected based on its current income. In regards to the right to health amongst the adult population, the country achieves 92.2% of what is expected based on the nation's level of income. Kiribati falls into the "very bad" category when evaluating the right to reproductive health because the government is fulfilling only 45.5% of what the country is expected to achieve based on the resources (income) it has available.

=== Education ===
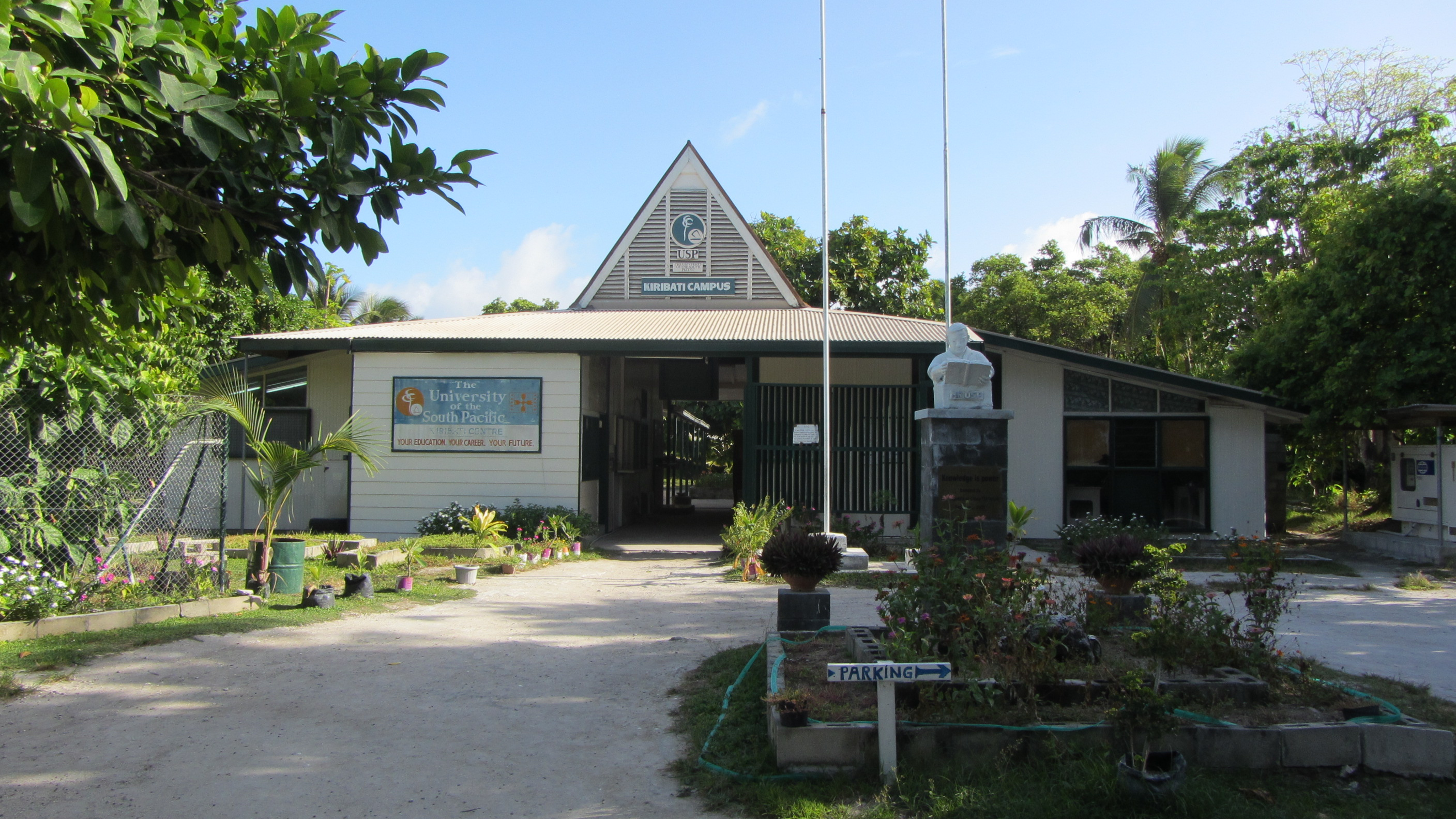
The University of the South Pacific, Kiribati Campus

Primary education is free and compulsory for the first nine years, beginning at age six. Mission schools are slowly being absorbed into the government primary school system. Higher education is expanding; students may seek technical, teacher or marine training, or study in other countries. Most choosing to do the latter have gone to Fiji to attend the University of the South Pacific, and those wishing to complete medical training have been sent to Australia, New Zealand or Cuba.

The education system is organised as follows:

- Preschool for childhood from 1 to 5 years;
- Primary school (Class 1 to 6) from 6 to 11 years;
- Junior secondary school (Form 1 to 3) from 12 to 14;
- Senior secondary school (Form 4 to 7) from 15 to 18.

Kiribati Ministry of Education is the education ministry. The government high schools are King George V and Elaine Bernacchi School, Tabiteuea North Senior Secondary School, and Melaengi Tabai Secondary School. Thirteen high schools are operated by Christian churches.

The University of the South Pacific has a campus in Teaoraereke for distant/flexible learning, but also to provide preparatory studies towards obtaining certificates, diplomas and degrees at other campus sites.

The other prominent schools in Kiribati are:

- the Marine Training Centre in Betio;
- the Kiribati Institute of Technology;
- the Kiribati Fisheries Training Centre;
- the Kiribati School of Nursing;
- the Kiribati Police Academy;
- the Kiribati Teachers College.

== Culture ==
Songs (te anene) and dances (te mwaie) are held in high regard.

=== Music ===
Kiribati folk music is generally based on chanting or other forms of vocalising, accompanied by body percussion. Public performances in modern Kiribati are generally performed by a seated chorus, accompanied by a guitar. However, during formal performances of the standing dance (Te Kaimatoa) or the hip dance (Te Buki), a wooden box is used as a percussion instrument. This box is constructed to give a hollow and reverberating tone when struck simultaneously by a chorus of men sitting around it. Traditional songs are often love-themed, but there are also competitive, religious, children's, patriotic, war and wedding songs. There are also stick dances which accompany legends and semi-historical stories. These stick dances or tirere (pronounced "seerere") are performed only during major festivals.

=== Dance ===
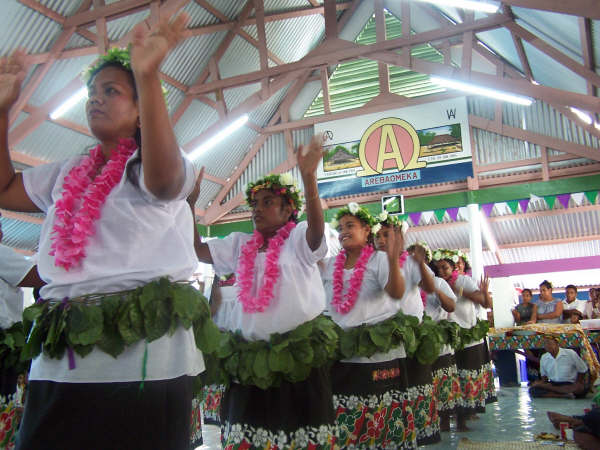
A welcome display

Kiribati dance is distinguished among other Pacific island dances by its emphasis on the outstretched arms of the dancer and sudden birdlike movements of the head. The frigate bird (Fregata minor) on the Kiribati flag is emblematic of this bird-like style of Kiribati dancing. Most dances are in the standing or sitting position with movement limited and staggered. Smiling whilst dancing is generally considered vulgar within the context of Kiribati dancing. This is due to its origin of not being solely as a form of entertainment but as a form of storytelling and a display of the skill, beauty and endurance of the dancer.

=== Cuisine ===
Traditionally, the staple diet of the I-Kiribati was the abundance of seafood and coconuts. Starch-based carbohydrate sources were not plentiful due to the hostile climate of the atolls, with only the northernmost atolls being viable for constant agriculture. The national crop, bwabwai, was only eaten during special celebrations along with pork.

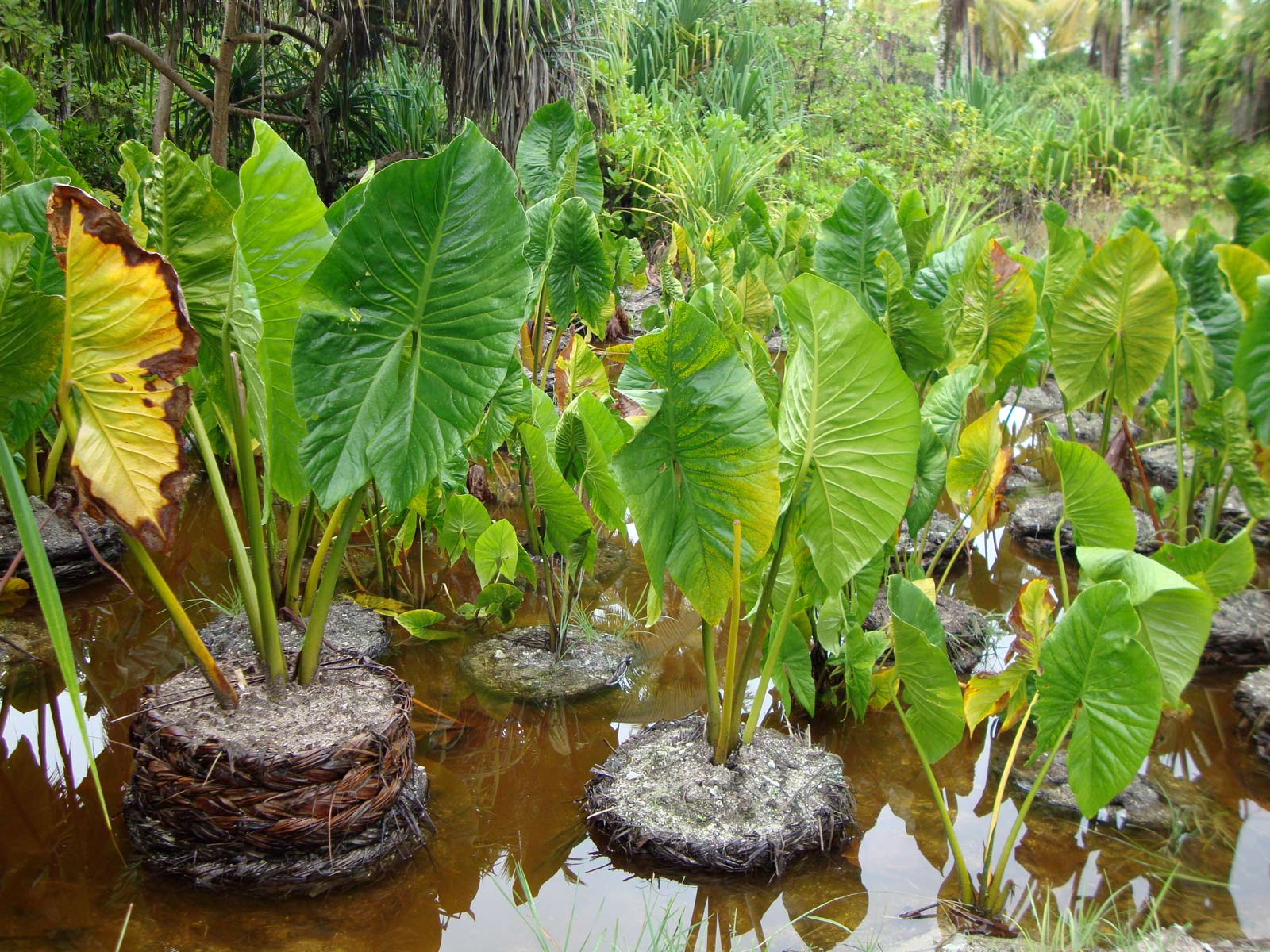
Bwabwai cultivation in Butaritari

To complement the rather low consumption of carbohydrates in their diets, the I-Kiribati processed the sap and fruit of the abundant pandanus and coconut trees into different beverages and foods such as te karewe (fresh daily sap of the coconut tree) or te tuae (dried pandanus cake) and te kabubu (dried pandanus flour) from pandanus fruit pulp and te kamaimai (coconut sap syrup) from coconut sap.

After World War II, rice became a daily staple in most households; this is still the case today. The majority of seafood—in particular, fish—is eaten sashimi-style with either coconut sap, soy sauce, or vinegar-based dressings, often combined with chillies and onions.

Coconut crabs and mud crabs are traditionally given to breastfeeding mothers, with the belief that the meat stimulates the production of high-quality breast milk.

=== Sport ===
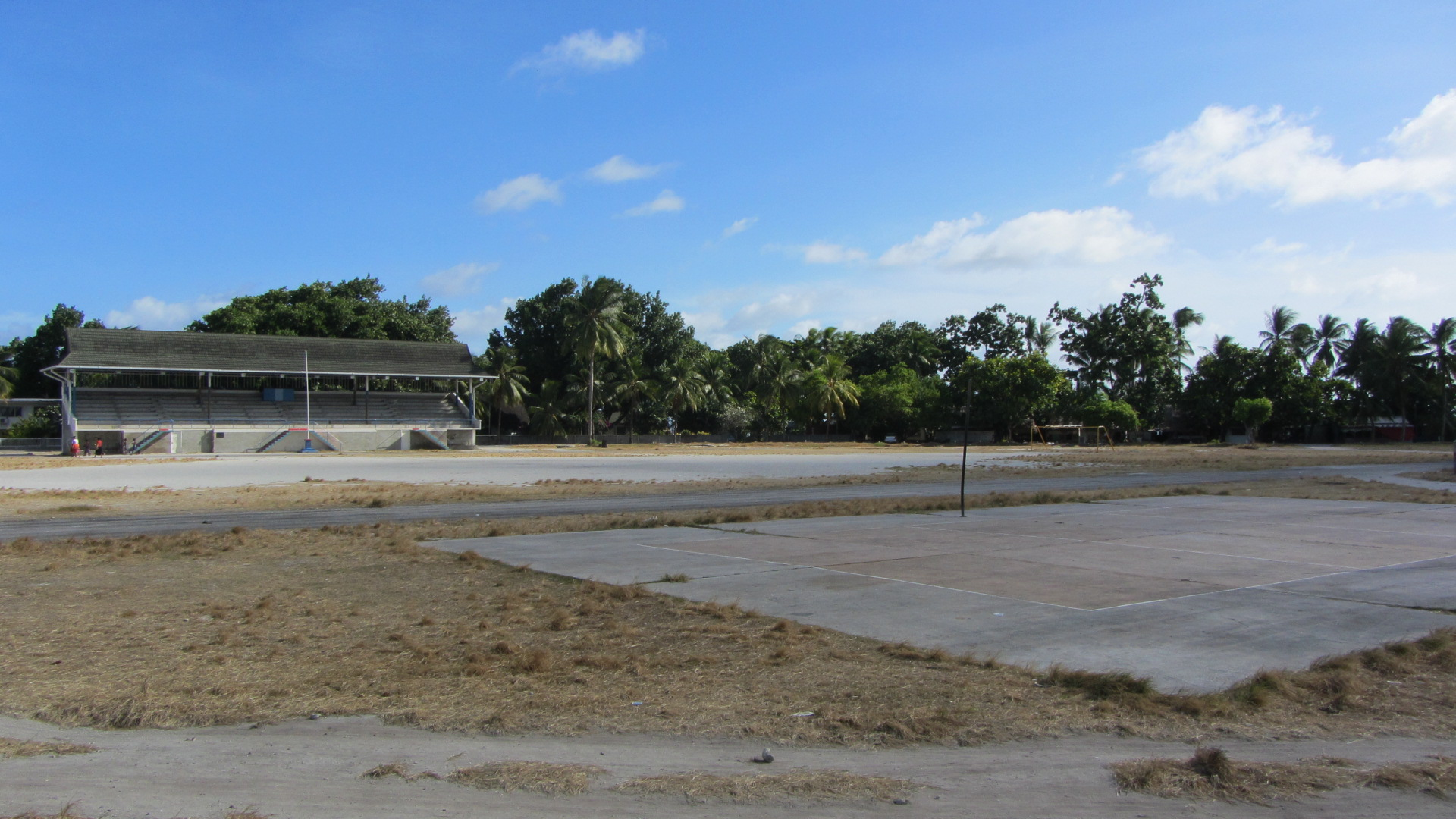
Bairiki National Stadium, at Bairiki, Tarawa

Kiribati has competed at the Commonwealth Games since 1998 and the Summer Olympics since 2004. It sent three competitors to its first Olympics, two sprinters and a weightlifter. Kiribati won its first ever Commonwealth Games medal at the 2014 Commonwealth Games, when weightlifter David Katoatau won Gold in the 105 kg Group.

Football is the most popular sport. Kiribati Islands Football Federation (KIFF) is an associate member of the Oceania Football Confederation, but not of world-governing body FIFA. Instead, they are member of ConIFA. The Kiribati National team has played ten matches, all of which they have lost, and all at the Pacific Games from 1979 to 2011. The Kiribati football stadium is Bairiki National Stadium, which has a capacity of 2,500.

The Betio Soccer Field is home to a number of local sporting teams.

=== Outside perspectives ===
Edward Carlyon Eliot, who was Resident Commissioner of the Gilbert and Ellice Islands (now Kiribati and Tuvalu) from 1913 to 1920, describes this period in his autobiography Broken Atoms.

Sir Arthur Grimble wrote about his time working in the British colonial service in Kiribati (then the Gilbert Islands) from 1914 to 1932 in two popular books A Pattern of Islands (1952) and Return to the Islands (1957). He also undertook academic studies of Gilbertese culture.

John Smith, the last governor of the Gilbert and Ellice Islands, wrote his memoir An Island in the Autumn (2011).

J. Maarten Troost's more recent autobiographical experiences in Tarawa are documented in his book The Sex Lives of Cannibals (2004).

Alice Piciocchi's illustrated essay, Kiribati. Cronache illustrate da una terra (s)perduta, (2016) Milan: 24 ORE Cultura, also translated into French (2018, éditions du Rouergue), tries to write and portray a comprehensive encyclopaedic book of modern Kiribati.

== See also ==
- List of towns and villages in Kiribati
- Outline of Kiribati

== Bibliography ==
- Dixon, Keith (2021). Acclimatising to higher ground: The realities of life of a Pacific atoll people. Sidestone. ISBN 978-94-6426-029-8..
- Ellis, Albert F. (1935). Ocean Island and Nauru; Their Story. Sydney, Australia: Angus and Robertson. OCLC 3444055.
- Grimble, Arthur (1981) [1952]. A Pattern of Islands. Penguin Books. ISBN 978-1-906011-45-1.
- Grimble, Arthur (1989). Tungaru Traditions: Writings on the Atoll Culture of the Gilbert Islands. Penguin Travel Library. University of Hawaii Press. ISBN 978-0-8248-1217-1.
- Koch, Gerd (translated by Guy Slater) (1986). The Material Culture of Kiribati. Suva: University of the South Pacific. ISBN 9789820200081.
- Te Rikitianere ni baibara, ae te boki ni kaoti nanon taeka ianena aika 376 aika n te baibara ni kiribati: ma te kankaotanti ae karako [Gilbert Islands Bible dictionary, and pocket concordance of proper names and contents of the Bible]. Honolulu: E katauraoaki irouni beiñam. 1895.
- Macdonald, Barrie (1982). Cinderellas of the Empire: Towards a History of Kiribati and Tuvalu. Australian National University Press. ISBN 9789820203358 – via Google Books.
- Moseley, William G. (2014). An Introduction to Human-Environment Geography: Local Dynamics and Global Processes. Wiley-Blackwell. ISBN 978-1-4051-8932-3.
- Piciocchi, Alice (2016). Kiribati: cronache illustrate da una terra (s)perduta. Milan, Italy: 24 ORE Cultura. ISBN 978-88-6648-307-6. (also in French)
- Sabatier, Ernest (1954). Dictionnaire gilbertin-français. Mission of the Sacred Heart.
- Stearns, Harold Thornton (1973). Geologic Setting of the Fossil Goose Bones Found on Molokai Island, Hawaii. Bernice P. Bishop Museum. "Malayo-Polynesian terms for the dog, te kiri, and the pig. te buaka, occur in Gilbertese word lists, but in general usage the dog is often called te kamea (from "come here") and the pig is known only as te beki."
- Stevenson, Robert Louis (1896). In the South Seas.
- Thomas, Frank R. (2003). "Kiribati: 'Some aspects of human ecology,' forty years later" (PDF). Atoll Research Bulletin. 501: 1–40. doi:10.5479/si.00775630.501.1.
- Troost, J. Maarten (8 June 2004). The Sex Lives of Cannibals. Broadway Books. ISBN 978-0-76-791530-4.
- Walsh, Michael Ravell (2020). A History of Kiribati: From the Earliest Times to the 40th Anniversary of the Republic. ISBN 9-79869535-895-7.
- Whincup, Joan; Whincup, Tony (2001). Akekeia! Traditional dance in Kiribati. Wellington, NZ.
- Williams, Maslyn; Macdonald, Barrie (1985). The Phosphateers: A History of the British Phosphate Commissioners and the Christmas Island Phosphate Commission. Melbourne University Press. ISBN 978-0-522-84302-6.
