= Religion in Kiribati =

Religion in Kiribati (2020 census)
1. Catholic Church (58.9%)
2. Uniting Church (21.2%)
3. Other Christian (16.1%)
4. Baháʼí Faith (2.10%)
5. Other / None (1.70%)

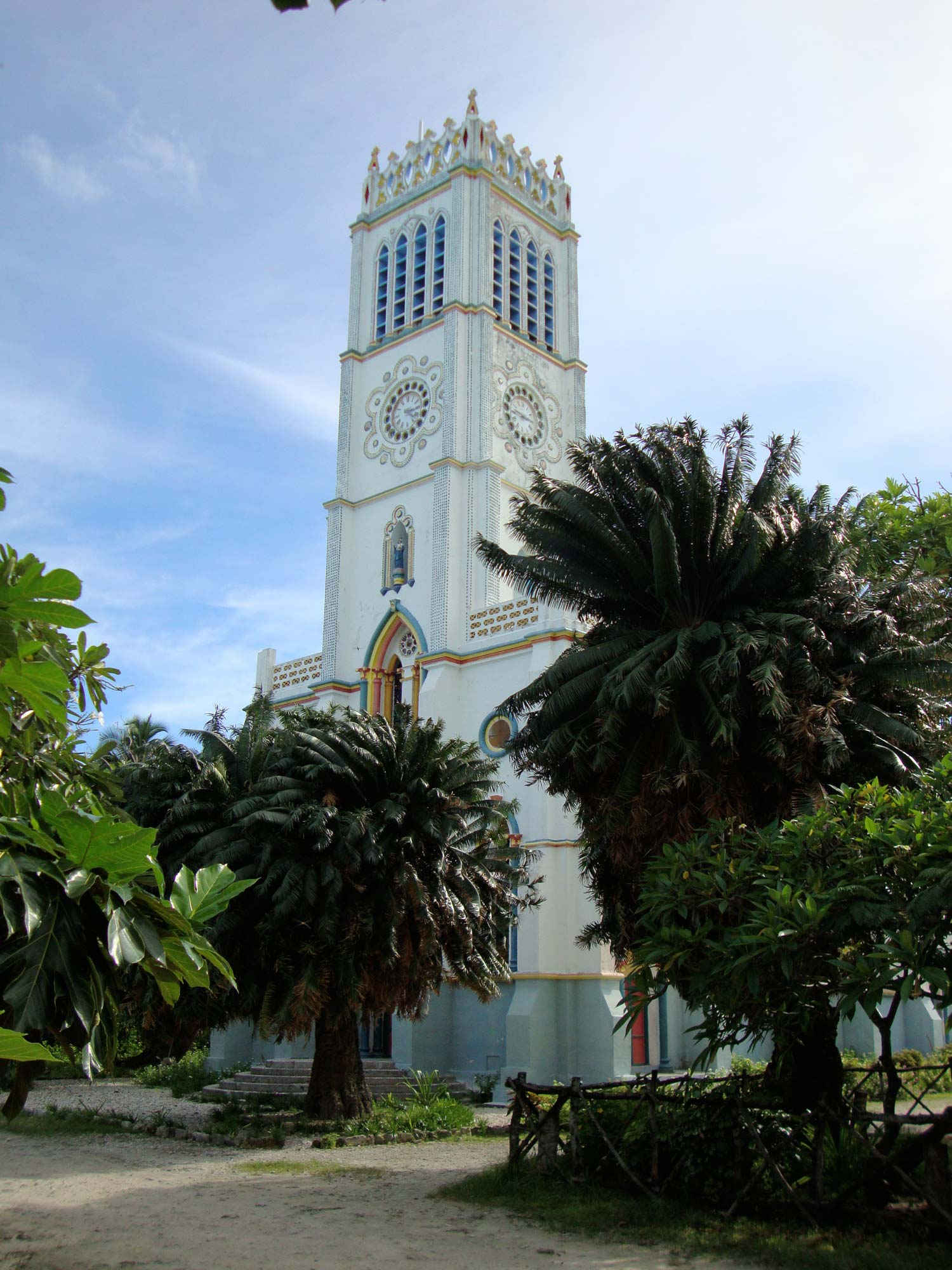
Cathedral of Our Lady of the Rosary in Koinawa, Abaiang

Christianity is the predominant religion in Kiribati, with Catholicism being its largest denomination.

Kiribati is a secular state and the freedom of religion is enshrined in its constitution.

== Overview ==
According to 2020 government statistics, Christian groups form about 96% of the Kiribati population, most of whom are either Catholic or members of the new Kiribati Uniting Church (redenominated in 2015) and Kiribati Protestant Church. Persons with no religious affiliation account for about 0.1% of the population. Members of the Catholic Church are concentrated in the northern islands, while Protestants are the majority in the southern islands.

Missionaries introduced Christianity into the area in the mid-19th century. Hiram Bingham II of the American Board of Commissioners for Foreign Missions arrived in Abaiang in 1857. The Rev. Samuel James Whitmee, of the London Missionary Society, visited the islands in 1870. Missionaries continue to be present and operate freely. The Constitution provides for freedom of religion, and the government generally respects this right. Societal abuses or discrimination based on religious belief or practice occur, but are relatively infrequent.

Over the period from 1990 to 2020, some changes have been recorded across the Kiribati population with a 6% increase in affiliation with the Catholic Church. The KUC/KPC have seen a decline of 10%.

Religion is always very active in urban and rural island communities, providing pastoral care, youth faith programmes, women's activities, support for overseas workers, chaplaincy work as well as vocational training for young men and women. The KUC also runs a Theological College. It is becoming common for church groups to build maneabas, a traditional style meeting house, particularly in the larger villages’ settlements and especially in South Tarawa (Wincup 2010). While lacking the deep cultural significance and use, the church groups utilise these large space buildings for a range of community activities.

== Education role ==
The role of church organisations in the education sector is often crucial in their role in Early Childhood Education & Care (ECCE) centres and Secondary level schools. Data from the Kiribati Ministry of Education (MoE) for 2020 report that 130 ECCE Centres (43% of total ECCE) are administered by Church groups. At the Secondary level, all 11 Combined (Junior & Secondary) High Schools across Kiribati are run by the Catholic Church (5), Kiribati Uniting Church (4), Seventh Day Adventists (1) and The Church of Jesus Christ of Latter-day Saints (1). At the Senior High School level, the Catholic Church (4) and KUC (2) contribute an important part of the education sector and the community (MoE 2022).

== Catholicism ==
In 2020, Catholicism was the single largest religion in Kiribati with over 58% of the population. Catholic missionaries were amongst the first Europeans to settle in the Gilbert Islands (1888) and in 1897 the first permanent structures were in place when it became part of the Apostolic vicariate of Gilbert Islands. In 1966 it was raised to the status of diocese and became known as the Diocese of Tarawa. In 1978, the year before independence, it changed names and became known as the Diocese of Tarawa, Nauru and Funafuti. Nauru and Funafuti were part of the Apostolic Vicariate. Four years later Funafuti split and became a Mission Sui Iuris. The remaining structure today is the Diocese of Tarawa and Nauru and was led by elected Bishop Koru Tito until his death.

== Protestantism ==
In 2020, Protestants made up 35% of the Kiribati population; the largest Protestant denomination in the country is Kiribati Uniting Church, but the Kiribati Protestant Church (KPC) was the original denomination of this church, and it is now a separated church with less believers (8.4% in 2020).

== The Church of Jesus Christ of Latter-day Saints ==
The Church of Jesus Christ of Latter-Day Saints claims 17,462 members in 26 congregations on December 31, 2016, though the 2020 census had only 6,720 people (5.6%) identifying as Mormon. From church membership data on December 31, 2019, the Church reported 20,946 members in 37 congregations, but the actual number does not exceed 6,720 during the November 2020 census. As of October 4, 2020, a temple was announced to be constructed in Kiribati.

== Baháʼí Faith ==
The only substantial non-Christian population is of the Baháʼí Faith. The Baháʼí Faith in Kiribati begins after 1916 with a mention by `Abdu'l-Bahá, then head of the religion, that Baháʼís should take the religion to the Gilbert Islands which form part of modern Kiribati. The first Baháʼís pioneered to the island of Abaiang (aka Charlotte Island, of the Gilbert Islands), on March 4, 1954. They encountered serious opposition from some Catholics on the islands and were eventually deported and the first convert banished to his home island. However, in one year there was a community of more than 200 Baháʼís and a Baháʼí Local Spiritual Assembly. Three years later the island where the first convert was sent to was found to now have 10 Baháʼís. By 1963 there were 14 assemblies.

As the Ellice Islands gained independence as Tuvalu and the Gilbert Islands and others formed Kiribati, the communities of Baháʼís also reformed into separate institutions of National Spiritual Assemblies in 1981. The Baháʼís had established a number schools by 1963 and there are still such today - indeed the Ootan Marawa Baháʼí Vocational Institute being the only teacher training institution for pre-school teachers in Kiribati. The census figures are consistently between 2 and 3% for the Baháʼís while the Baháʼís claim numbers above 17%. All together the Baháʼís now claim more than 10,000 local people have joined the religion over the last 50 years and there are 38 local spiritual assemblies.

== Other ==
The 2010 and 2015 censuses listed smaller religions such as Te Koaua (Jehova's Witnesses), Assembly of God, Church of God, and Islam as other options. There is also an All Nations Church with few followers (Ministries Without Borders). According to the Association of Religion Data Archives, there is a non-negligible population of Buddhists comprising less than 0.1% of the population. Unlike many Pacific Island countries, there was no significant Indian migration to Kiribati and in 1981, the Indian population comprised only 15 people, mostly expatriates on assignment from the Government of India. The main religions of the Indian families in Kiribati are Hinduism, Sikhism, and Christianity. On 30 October 1978, a Diwali festival was celebrated with a feast in the country. As of 2010, the Hindu population in Kiribati is still negligible. According to the 2020 official census, 102 Muslims reside in the country, 0.1% of the population.

== Religious freedom ==
Any religious group representing more than 2 percent of the population (about 2160 people as of the 2015 census) must register with the government, although there are no penalties for failure to register.

There is no standardized religious education program in public schools, but schools generally allow representatives of various faiths to provide religious education courses.

Two islands in Kiribati, Arorae and Tamana, maintain a "one-church-only" tradition, refusing to build any religious structures other than a single church. According to officials, this custom is in deference to the Protestant missionaries that arrived on those islands in the 19th century. Residents of other religions on those islands are able to worship freely in their homes, and the government has received no reports of complaints about this policy.
