= Catholic Church in Kiribati =

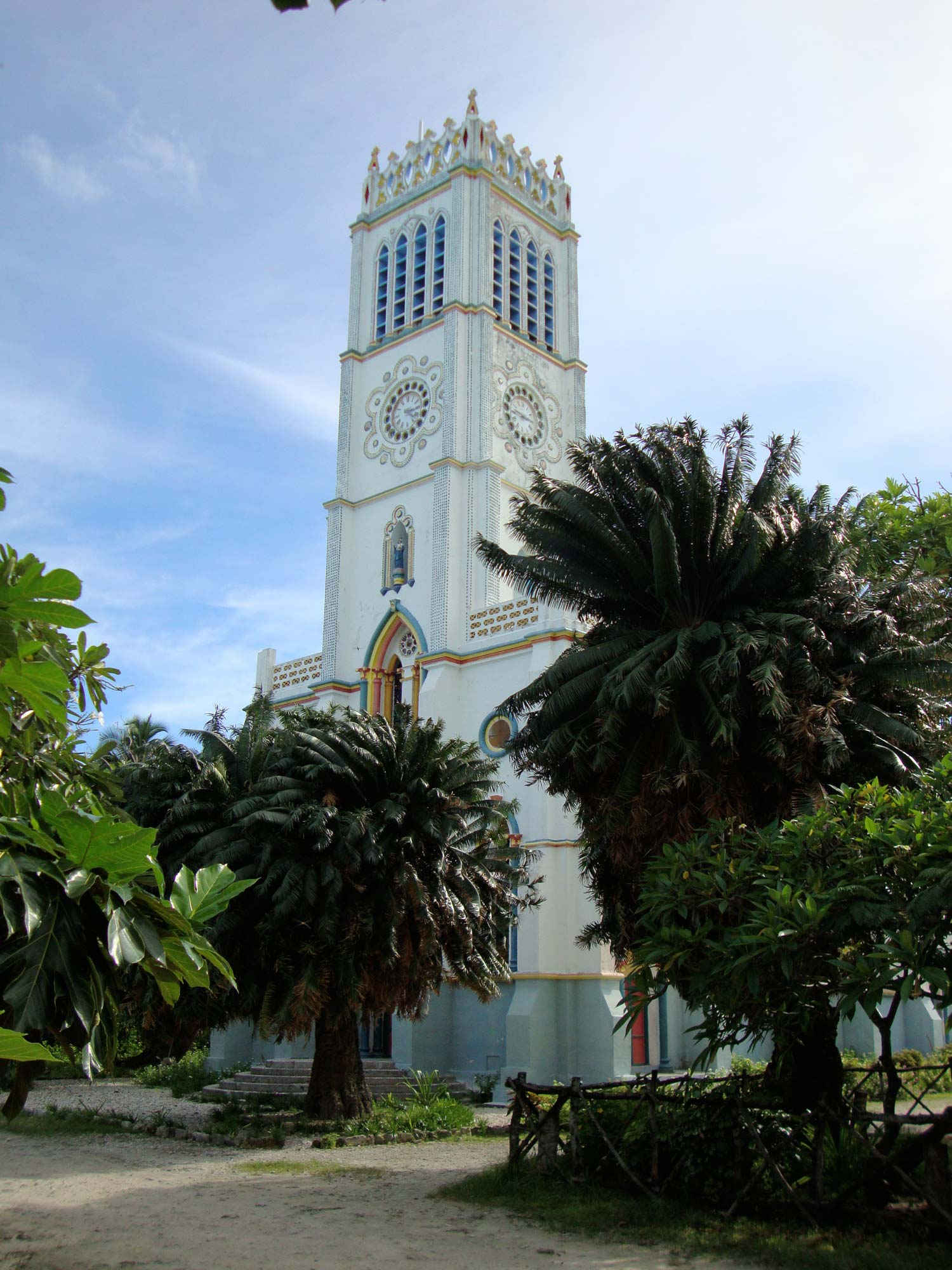
Church of Our Lady of the Rosary in Koinawa, Abaiang, Kiribati. It is the biggest church on the island.

The Catholic Church in Kiribati is part of the worldwide Catholic Church, which, inspired by the life, death and teachings of Jesus Christ, and under the spiritual leadership of the Pope and Roman curia in the Vatican City (in Rome) is the largest Christian church in the world. Koru Tito is Bishop of Tarawa and Nauru, with see in Kiribati.

== Demography ==
Kiribati is predominantly Christian with a population of 119,940 in 2020: 58% were Catholic and Protestants from both Kiribati Protestant Church and Kiribati Uniting Church were 28%.

The Constitution of Kiribati provides for freedom of religion. The Christian festivals of Christmas, Easter, and National Gospel Day are official religious holidays.

== History ==
Lying halfway between Hawaii and Australia, Kiribati consists of 32 low-lying atolls and one raised island in a vast expanse of ocean comprising three main groupings: the Gilbert Islands, Phoenix Islands, and Line Islands.

The original inhabitants of Kiribati are an Austronesian people who arrived more than 2000 BP. Invasions by Fijians and Tongans brought Melanesian and Polynesian influence. European contact began in the 16th century. In 1892, the Gilbert and Ellice Islands (now Tuvalu) became British protectorates. A British colony from 1916, and scene of bitter fighting during World War II, Kiribati became an independent nation in 1979.

The first Catholics were locals who had returned from working in Tahiti. They invited the Missionaries of the Sacred Heart (MSC) to come from France. Upon the partition of the Vicariate of Micronesia, the Gilbert Islands were created as a separate vicariate by the Catholic Church in 1897. Mgr. Joseph Leray was placed at its head and, with other MSC priests, he began missionary work in the islands.

In 1966, the vicariate of bishop Pierre Guichet was elevated to become the Diocese of Tarawa. In 1978, the name changed to Diocese of Tarawa, Nauru and Funafuti. This was split in 1982 into the Mission sui iuris of Funafuti and the Diocese of Tarawa and Nauru. Bishop Paul Mea, MSC, was ordained Bishop of Tarawa, Nauru and Funafuti, Kiribati in 1979.

The Sacred Heart Cathedral is in Teaoraereke, in South Tarawa, Kiribati.

== See also ==
- Diocese of Tarawa and Nauru
- Mission Sui Iuris of Funafuti
- Archdiocese of Suva
