= Nuribenua =

- Island
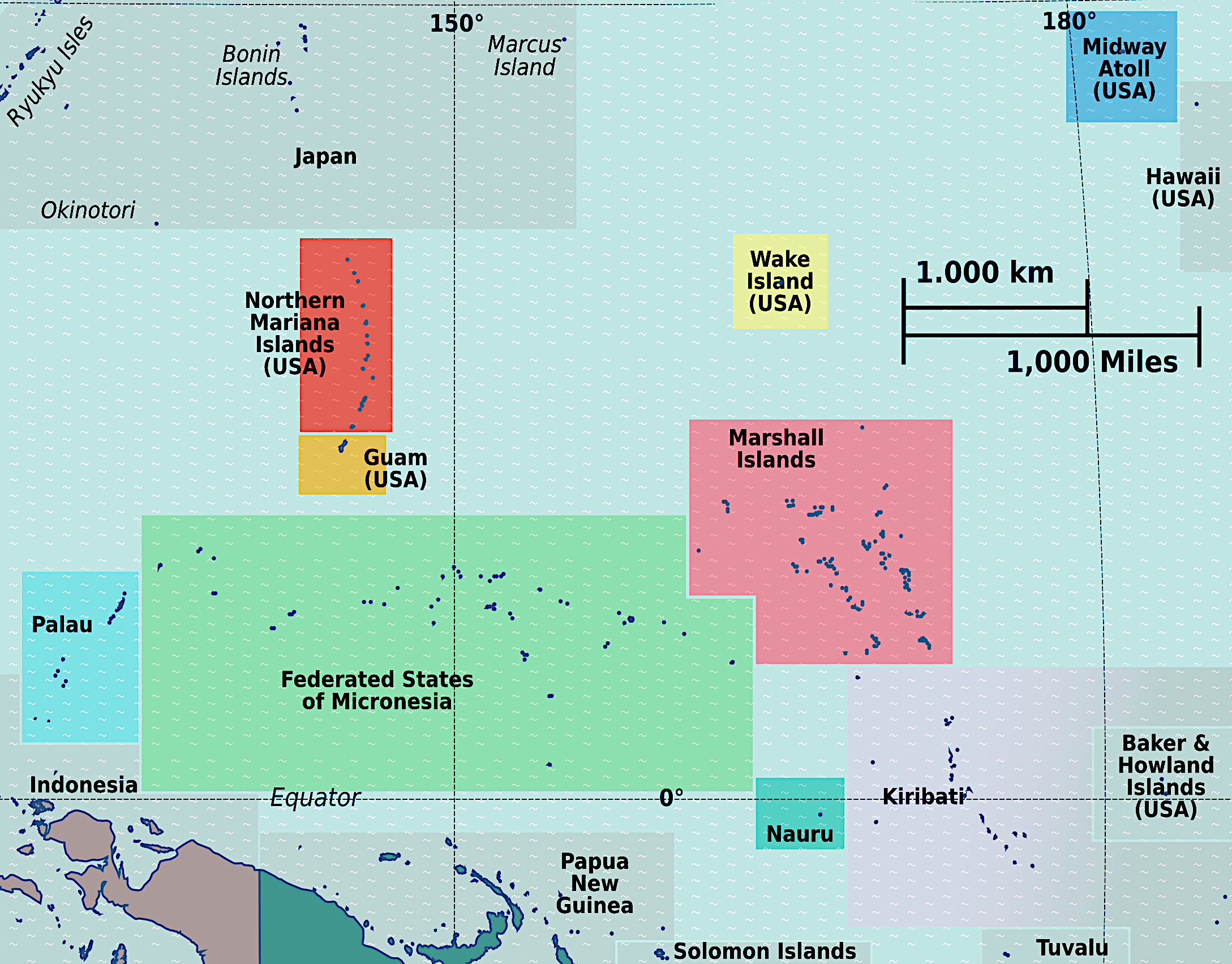
- Location within Kiribati Location within Micronesia Location within Oceania Location within Pacific Ocean
- Coordinates: 1°09′N 174°40′E
- Country: Kiribati
- Atoll: Tabiteuea
- District: North Tabiteuea
- Capital: Utiroa

Area
  - Total: 22.302 km^{2} (8.611 sq mi)

Population (2010)
  - Total: 3,200
  - Density: 140/km^{2} (370/sq mi)

Nuribenua is the largest island of Tabiteuea atoll in Kiribati; It includes the old Capital village of the atoll Terikiai (a.k.a. Aanikai, and sometimes also called Nuribenua), and the new capital village Utiroa (near the airport location). To its south are Tauma and Kabuna islands. To its north is Nonouti Atoll.

== Geography ==
Nuribenua forms the northern tip of the atoll. The elongated island runs from the north in a southeasterly direction. The northernmost place is Tekabwibwi, from there the island has moved out sharply to the north. At the southern end is the Tabiteuea North Airport.

In addition, the settlements Buota, Eita, Tanaeang, Tekaman, Terikiai and Utiroa are located on the island. The reef hem to the northeast, to the open sea is relatively wide.
