= Christ the King Church, Arubo =

Christ the King Church
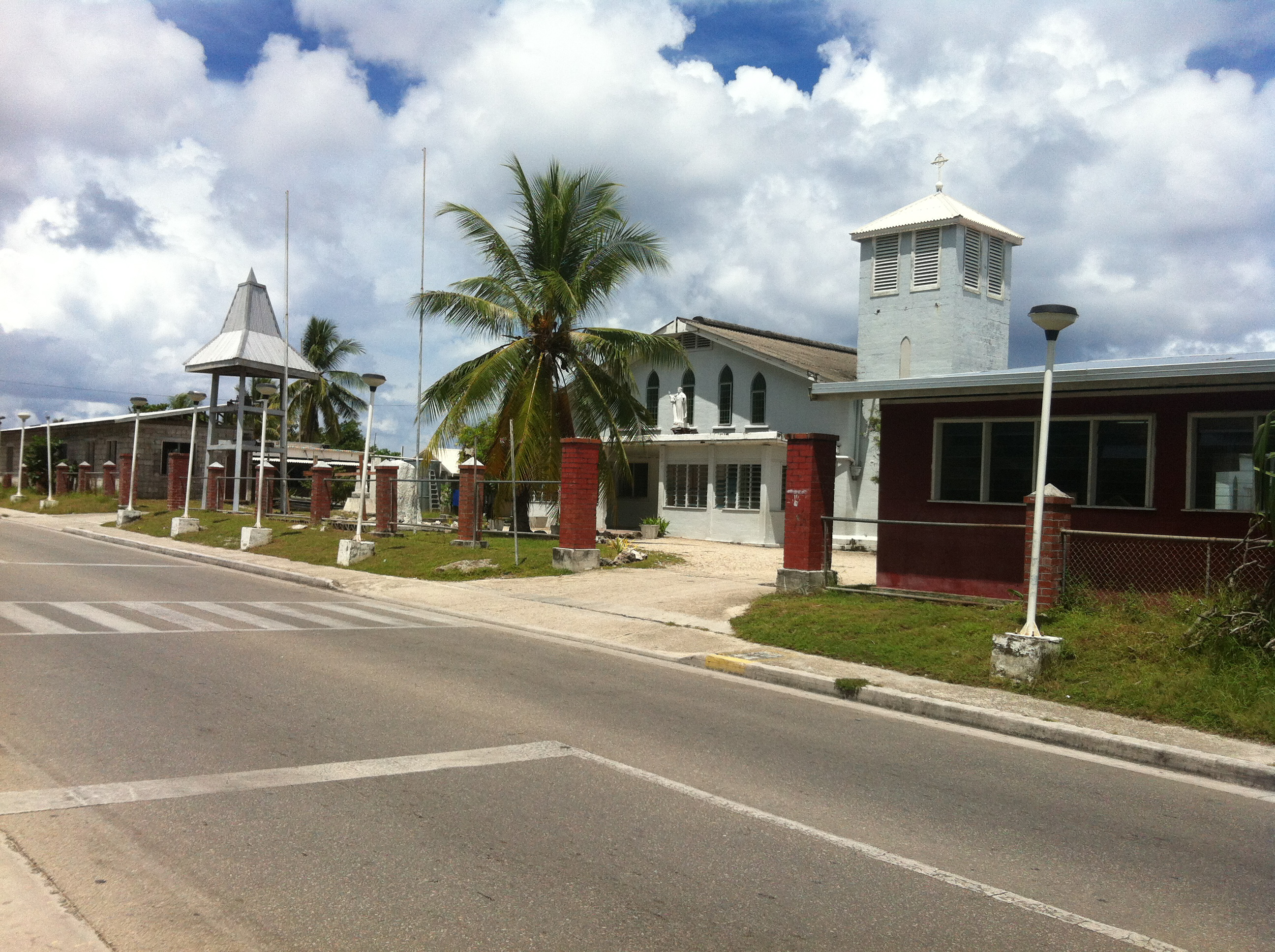

- Location within Nauru
- 0.505878°S 166.931729°E
- Location: Arubo
- Country: Nauru
- Denomination: Roman Catholic Church

Administration
- Diocese: Roman Catholic Diocese of Tarawa and Nauru

The Christ the King Church Also called the Catholic Church of Christ the King or simply Catholic Church of Arubo, is a religious building affiliated with the Catholic Church located in the town of Arubo in the district of Ewa in the north of the island of Nauru, a Country of Oceania.

The church follows the Roman or Latin rite and is within the Diocese of Tarawa and Nauru (Dioecesis Taravanus et Naurunus) which began as an apostolic vicariate in 1897 and was elevated to its current status in November 1966 by the bull "Prophetarum voes" of the Pope Paul VI.

In 2014, the church held a religious service of various Christian denominations to commemorate the World Day of Disabled Persons, and by January 2016 the church was selected as one of the places where the 48th anniversary of the Independence of Nauru from Australia was celebrated.

== Significance ==
Nauru's Catholic Church marked its centenary in 2002. Christ the King is the island's only Catholic church. A 2011 visitor's review describes a hall-type building of brick with white stucco and a squat tower, said to date from the 1920s, with a plain interior and the Nauruan flag serving as the tabernacle veil. At that time the congregation was made up of Nauruans, mostly Filipino residents and visitors, and the parish was served by a priest from Kiribati and a deacon from the Marshall Islands.

In 2012 the parish priest, Father Tatieru Ewenteang, worked with the island's three Sisters of the Missionaries of the Sacred Heart, and Catholics were reported to make up about 32 percent of Nauru's population of 9,000. Asylum seekers held on the island were welcomed at Mass, and some used the parish phone to call their families. The Catholic Church also owns Kayser College in Ewa, which is run and funded by the government.

== See also ==
- Roman Catholicism in Nauru
- Christ the King
