= Sacred Heart Cathedral, Kiribati =

Coordinates: 1.3327°N 173.0070°E

Sacred Heart Cathedral
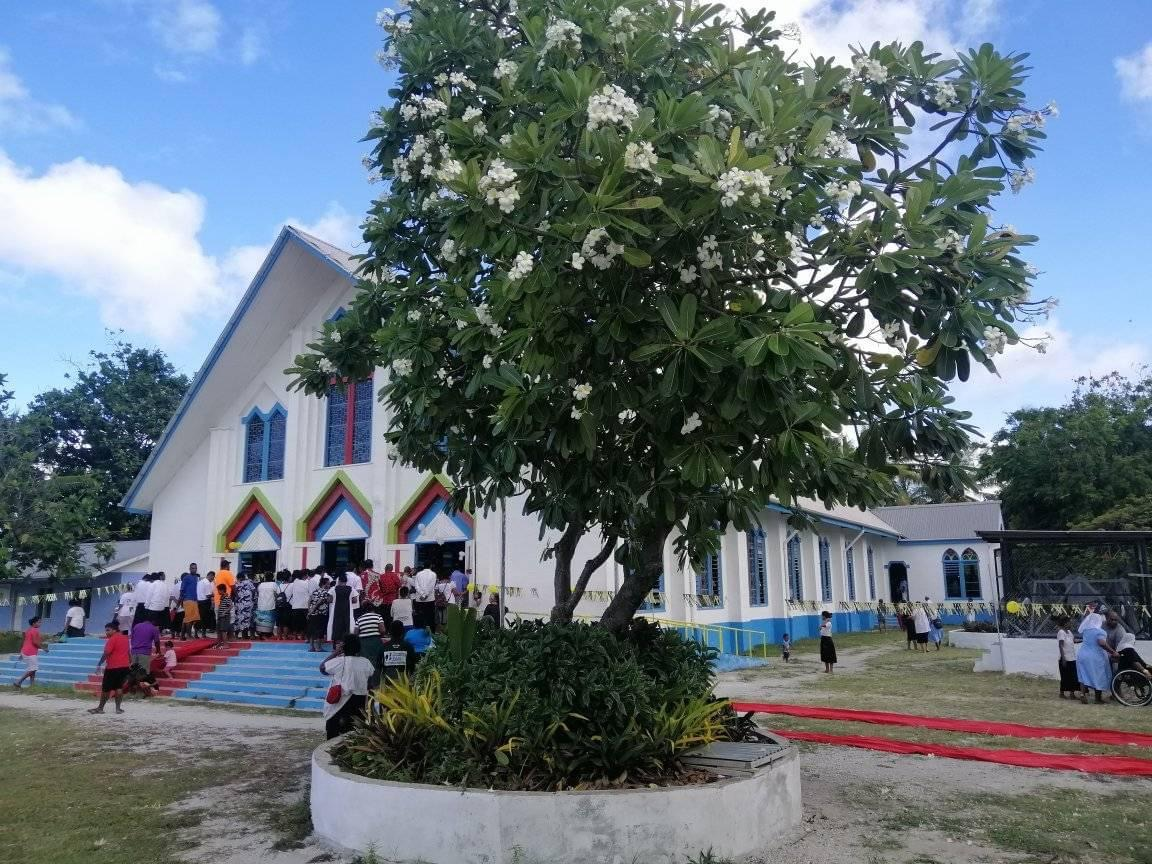
- Sacred Heart Cathedral
- Location: Teaoraereke, South Tarawa
- Country: Kiribati
- Denomination: Roman Catholic Church

The Sacred Heart Cathedral is a religious building of the Catholic church that is located in South Tarawa on the atoll of Tarawa part of the island nation of Kiribati in Oceania. The cathedral hosted Kiribati's first combined Catholic and Protestant church service in 1975. It is also associated with Bishop Paul Mea, who led the diocese for more than four decades and was buried beside the cathedral following his death in June 2021.

== History ==
Since 1966, the Sacred Heart Cathedral is the seat of the Bishop of the Diocese of Tarawa and Nauru (Dioecesis Taravana et Nauruna) which was created in 1982 to replace the Diocese of Tarawa and Nauru Funafuti of 1978 and Diocese of Tarawa of 1966. It was under the pastoral responsibility of the Bishop-elected Koru Tito, and since the acting Vicar general Tatau.

In 1975 the cathedral hosted the first combined church service of Catholics and Protestants held in Kiribati. Paul Mea, the diocese's I-Kiribati bishop from 1978 to 2020, died in June 2021 and was buried next to the cathedral. His successor, Koru Tito, who had served as assistant at the cathedral parish from 2008 to 2010, was appointed by Pope Francis on 29 June 2020. Tito died in August 2022 before being consecrated. In May 2024 the Holy See appointed Simon Samendra Mani, M.S.C., Rector of the Pacific Regional Seminary in Suva, as Bishop of Tarawa and Nauru. He was ordained at the sports complex in Betio on 27 July 2024.

== See also ==
- Roman Catholicism in Kiribati
- Sacred Heart Cathedral (disambiguation)
