= Catholic Church in Nauru =

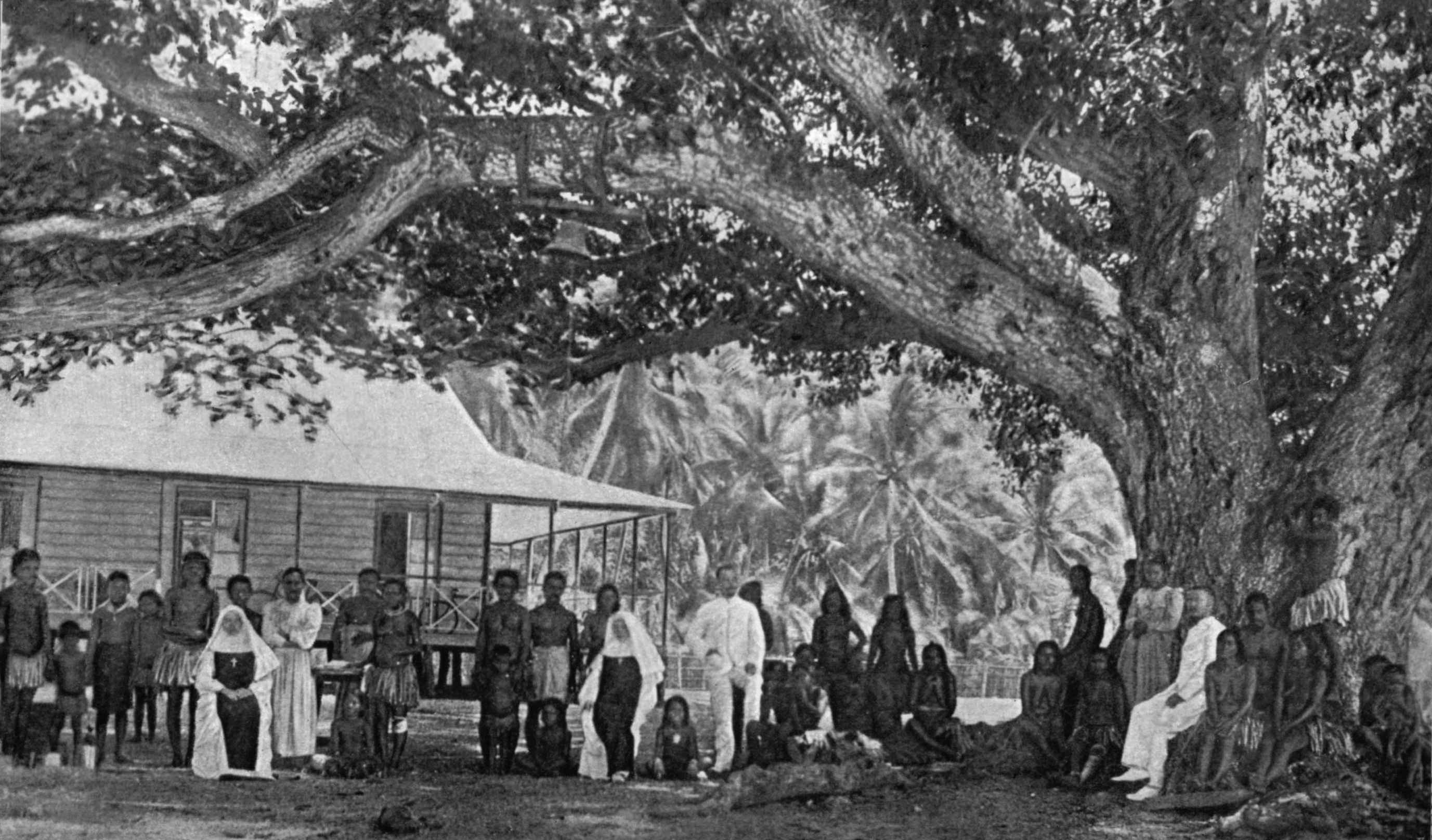
Catholic Mission, Nauru, 1914.

The Catholic Church in Nauru is part of the worldwide Catholic Church, which, inspired by the life, death and teachings of Jesus Christ, and under the spiritual leadership of the Pope and Roman curia in the Vatican City (within Rome) is the largest Christian church in the world.

The bishopric for the island is vacant in 2023, after the death of Koru Tito.

== Demographics ==
The South Pacific island republic of Nauru has an area of approximately 8 square miles (21 km^{2}) and a population of around 9,800. Christianity is the largest religion. According to the CIA World Factbook, Catholicism is narrowly the second largest Christian denomination in Nauru after Nauru Congregational Church, who made up 36% of the overall population at the time of the 2011 Census, with Catholics accounting for 33%.

== History ==
Nauru was first inhabited by Polynesians and Melanesians. Contact with European whalers began in the late 18th century. Prior to the arrival of Christianity, the inhabitants of Nauru adhered to an indigenous religion which believed in the primordial establishment of the island by two spirits who had come from Kiribati. The German government annexed the island in 1888.Christianity arrived in Nauru at the end of the 19th century, and began to impact Nauruan culture, brought by both a Catholic missionary and a Congregational minister. These two denominations remain the dominant religious affiliations on the island.

The Catholic Church established the Vicariate Apostolic of Gilbert Islands {Isole Gilbert} in 1897. A German colony until World War I, Nauru was thereafter jointly administered by Australia, New Zealand and Great Britain before being briefly occupied by Japan during World War II. In 1968, Nauru adopted its Constitution, which provided for Freedom of Religion, and became one of the world's smallest independent, democratic states.

Timothy Detudamo translated the Bible into the Nauruan language in the 1930s. In 1966, the Vicariate was elevated to become the Diocese of Tarawa. In 1978, the name changed to Diocese of Tarawa, Nauru and Funafuti. This was split in 1982 into the Mission "Sui Iuris" of Funafuti and the Diocese of Tarawa and Nauru. Bishop Paul Mea, M.S.C. was ordained Bishop of Tarawa, Nauru and Funafuti, Kiribati in 1979. He was succeeded in 2020 by Koru Tito; in 2023, the bishopric is vacant.

The Christian festivals of Christmas and Easter are official religious holidays in Nauru. The Catholic Church remains active in education and mission work. In 2020, there were 4 priests and 3 nuns serving one parish.

== See also ==
- Religion in Nauru
- Mission Sui Iuris of Funafuti
- Diocese of Tarawa and Nauru
