= Tabiteuea =

Atoll in the Gilbert Islands, Kiribati

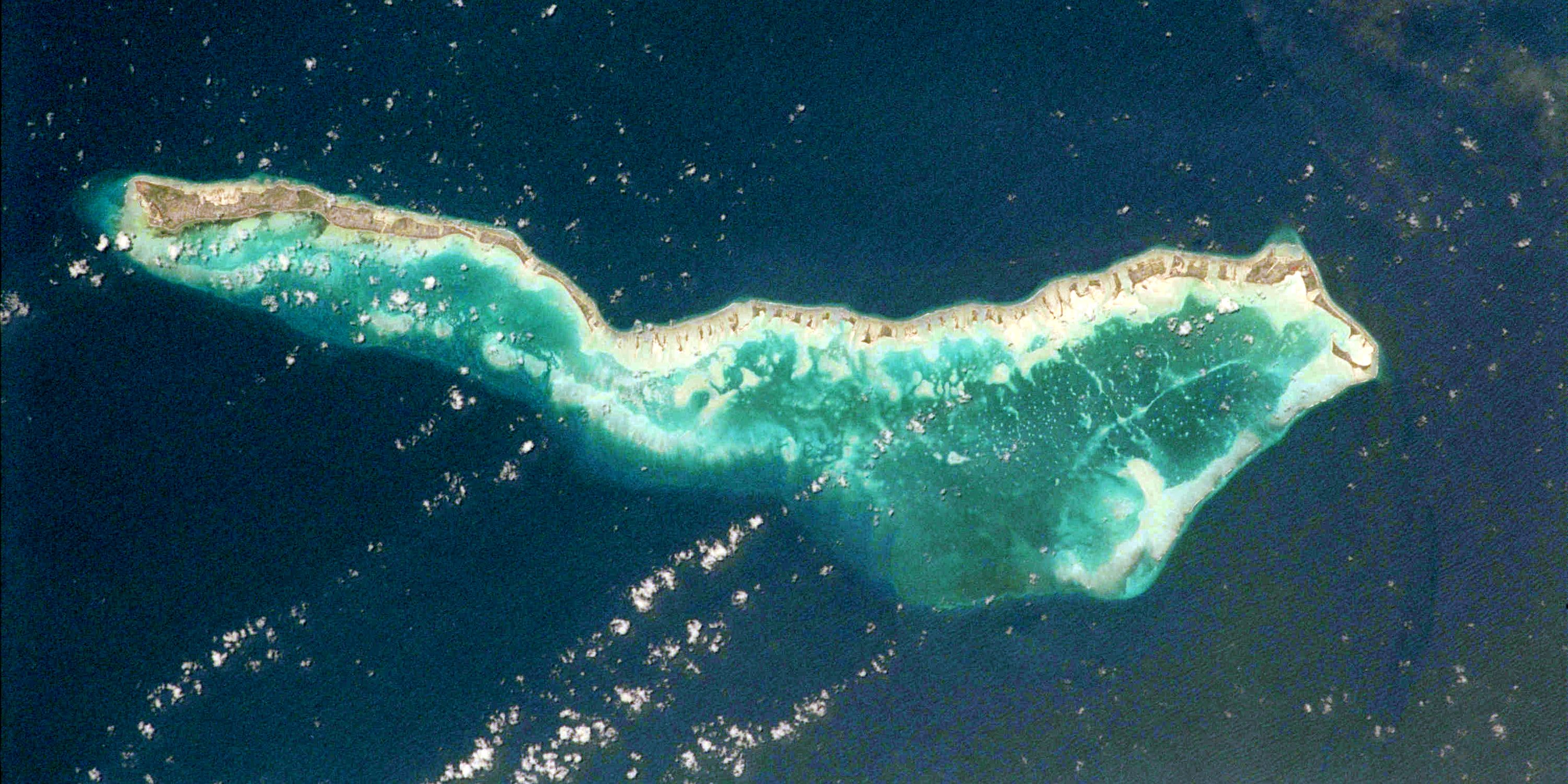
- Satellite photograph of Tabiteuea (NE top)

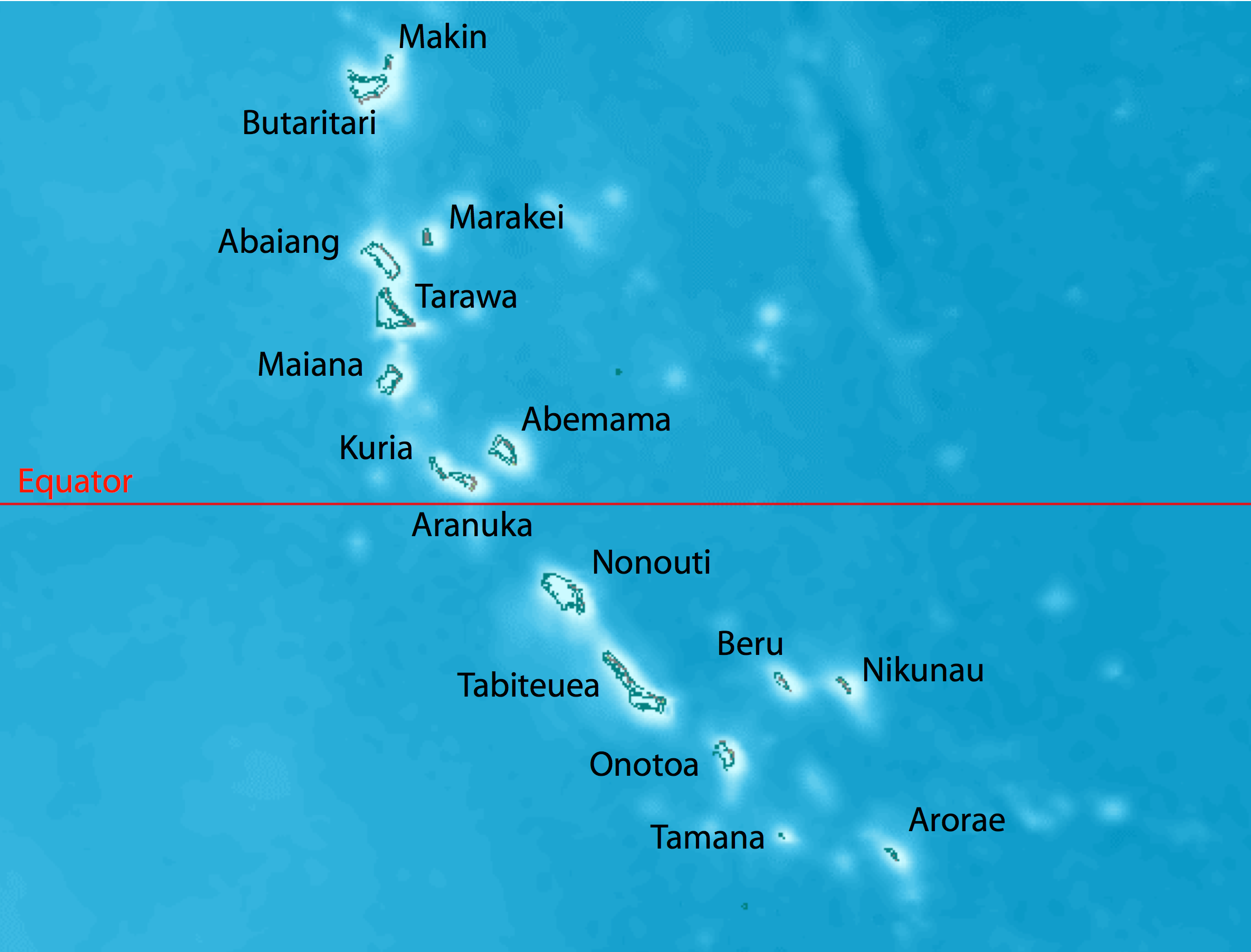

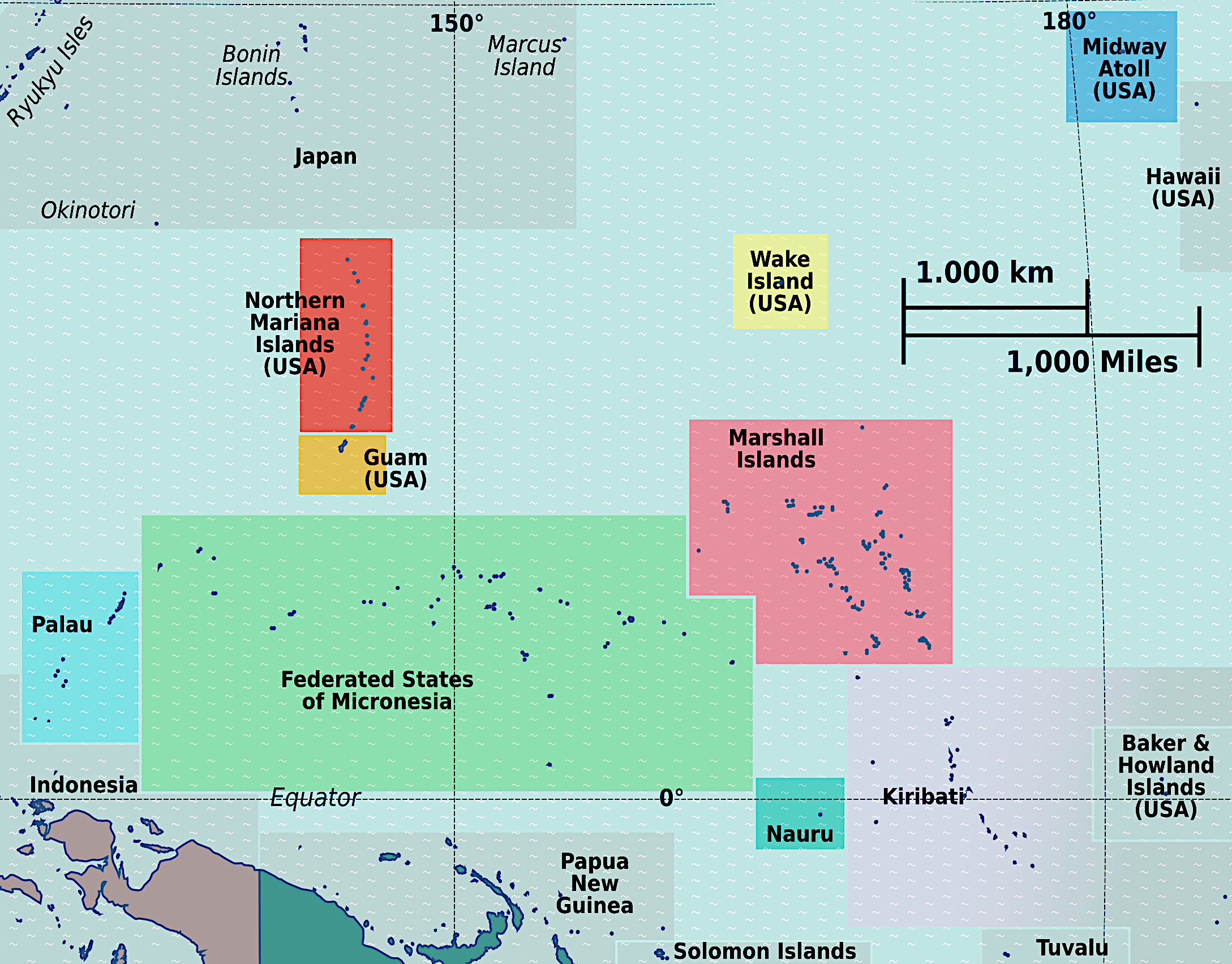
- Location within Kiribati Location within Micronesia Location within Oceania Location within Pacific Ocean

Geography
- Location: Pacific Ocean
- Coordinates: 1°21′S 174°48′E
- Archipelago: Gilbert Islands
- Major islands: Aanikai
- Area: 40.33 km^{2} (15.57 sq mi)
- Highest elevation: 3 m (10 ft)

Administration
- Kiribati
- Capital: Utiroa
- Former capital: Buariki

Demographics
- Population: 5,261 (2015 Census)
- Pop. density: 123.8/km^{2} (320.6/sq mi)
- Ethnic groups: I-Kiribati 99.7%

Tabiteuea (formerly Drummond's Island) is an atoll in the Gilbert Islands, Kiribati, farther south of Tarawa. This atoll is the second largest and the most populated of the Gilbert Islands after Tarawa. The atoll consists of one main island, Aanikai in the north, and several smaller islets in between along the eastern rim of the atoll. The atoll has a total land area of 38 km^{2} (15 sq mi), while the lagoon measures 365 km^{2} (141 sq mi). The population numbered 5,261 in 2015. The islanders have customary fishing practices related to the lagoon and the open ocean.

While most atolls of the Gilbert Islands correspond to local government areas governed by island councils, Tabiteuea, like the main atoll Tarawa, is divided into two:

- North Tabiteuea (in Gilbertese, Tabiteuea Meang) has a land area of 26 km^{2} (10 sq mi) and a population of 3,955 as of 2015, distributed among twelve villages (capital Utiroa)
- South Tabiteuea (Tabiteuea Maiaki) has a land area of 12 km^{2} (4.6 sq mi) and a population of 1,306, distributed among six villages (capital Buariki).

== History ==
"Tabiteuea" is Gilbertese for "no chief allowed"; the island is traditionally egalitarian and is known for its huge maneaba.

On 1 July 1799, Charles Bishop and George Bass entered in the lagoon of Tabiteuea and many canoes visited his brig Nautilus. Bishop called it Bishop’s Island, and called Aanikai, Drummond’s Island.

The Battle of Drummond's Island occurred during the United States Exploring Expedition in April 1841 at Tabiteuea, then known as Drummond's Island. After one sailor from sloop USS Peacock, was missing without reason, the US party decided on exacting redress for the incident. Twelve islanders were killed in the fighting and others were wounded. Utiroa village with more than 1,000 inhabitants, was burned and erased..

Around the 1840s, the USS Peacock crew stayed on the village in the North part of the island. After about 3 weeks, one crew from the American ship raped a young woman already betrothed to Tebubua from Eita village. The fiance came to Utiroa village and challenged the American sailor and he killed him on the Ocean side. After the incident, bad tension started but the hosting family was trying to calm things. In the end, the crew had a fight with the Utiroa young men. 2 locals were injured and 3 Americans died. The crew escaped to their ship. From the ship, they fired cannons to the village. There are several people died, men, women and kids in Utiroa village. The 3 dead ship sailors were taken to the maneaba and dismembered. They named their the place 'te raara ni matang'. It means 'the blood of the white men'.

During the American Civil War, the Confederate States Navy steamer CSS Shenandoah visited the island on March 23, 1865 in search of United States whalers, but the whalers had fled the area. Captain James Waddell described the islanders as "of copper colour, short of statue, athletic in form, intelligent and docile" and were "without a stitch of clothing".

In the late 1800s, the two parts of the island were the site of a religious war when the populace of North Tabiteuea, partly converted to Christianity and, led by a Hawaiian pastor called Kapu who had assembled a "hymn-singing army on a crusade", invaded and conquered South Tabiteuea, where was recently (1860) created a cult of Tioba (Jehovah).

Bishop Octave Terrienne built his main Catholic Church in Tanaeang, North Tabiteuea in 1936 and established there the see of his apostolic vicariate of the Gilbert and Ellice Islands.

Tabiteuea Post Office opened around 1911 and was renamed Tabiteuea North around 1972. Tabiteuea South Post Office opened on 13 September 1965.

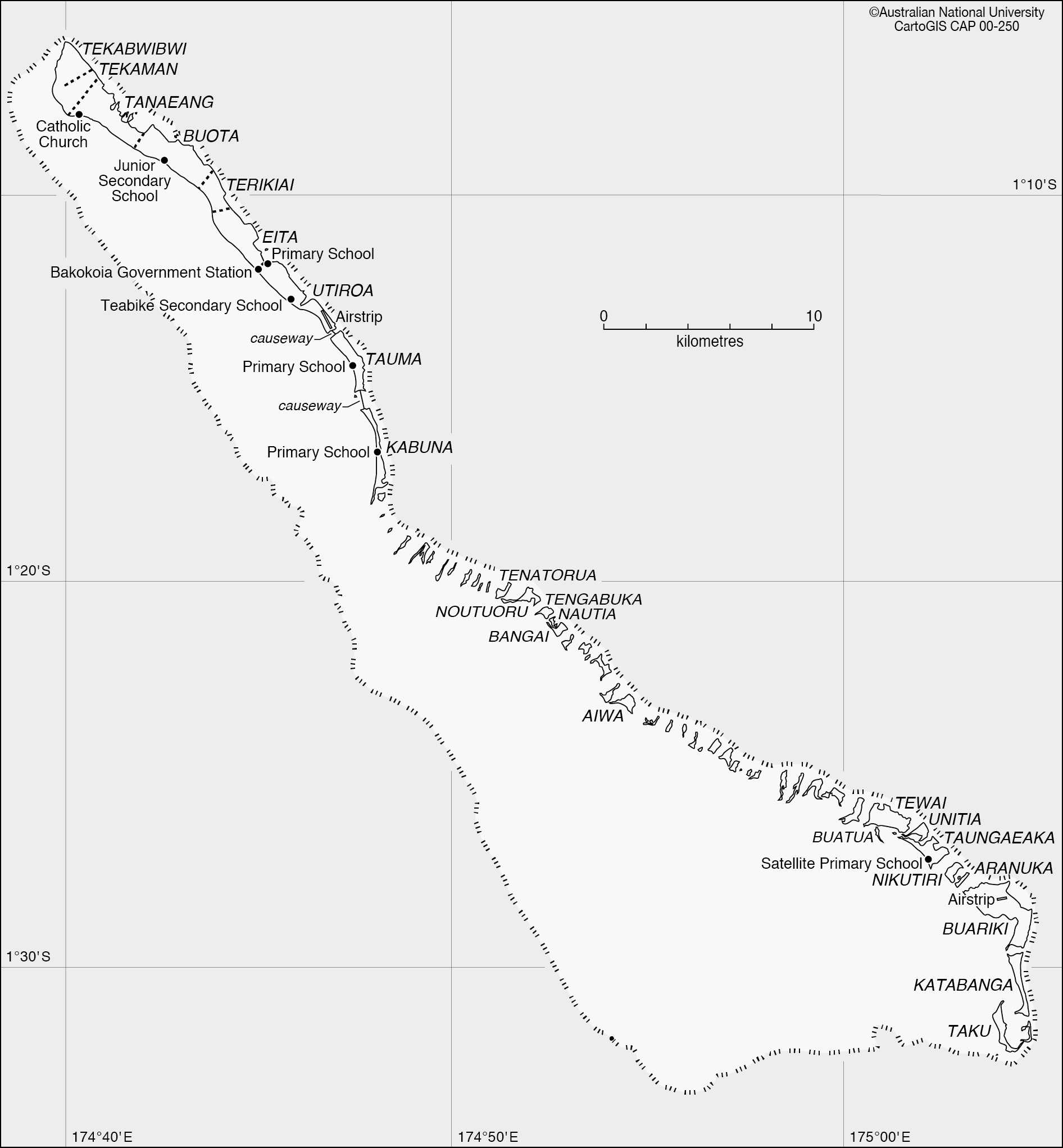
Map of Tabiteuea

== Education ==
There is a government high school, Tabiteuea North Senior Secondary School, also known as Teabike College. Located in Eita, it serves the entire island.

There is also a government junior high school, Takoronga School in Terikiai, serving all of Tab North.

The elementary schools on Tab North are all government schools. They include:

- Aiwa: Nukantewaa School, which also serves Bangai
- Buota: Taunibong School, which also serves Tanaeang
- Eita: Temwamwang School, which serves a portion of Eita as well as Utiroa; the school does not serve all of Eita, as Eita and Utiroa are both the settlements with the most people in Tabiteuea North.

Taunibong School in Buota serves as the elementary school. The area junior high school is Takoronga School in Terikiai, and the area senior high school is Tabiteuea North Senior Secondary School a.k.a. Teabike College in Eita.

- Kabuna: Kabuna School
- Tekaman: Burannikoraoi School, which also serves Tekabwibwi
- Terikiai: Takoronga School, which also serves a section of Eita; Kiribati authorities included a section of Eita in its attendance zone to relieve Temwamwang School
- Tanaatoorua: Ueen Maungan te Raoi School, which also serves Bangai
- Taumwa: Auriaria School
- Taku: Taku School

Students from Bangai may attend either Nukantewaa School or Ueen Maungan te Raoi School; Bangai does not have enough residents, so the Kiribati authorities do not operate a school there.

== Transport ==
There are two domestic airports:

- Tabiteuea North Airport that is the main hub serving the southern Gilbert Islands;
- Tabiteuea South Airport, only serving South Tabiteuea.

== Gallery ==
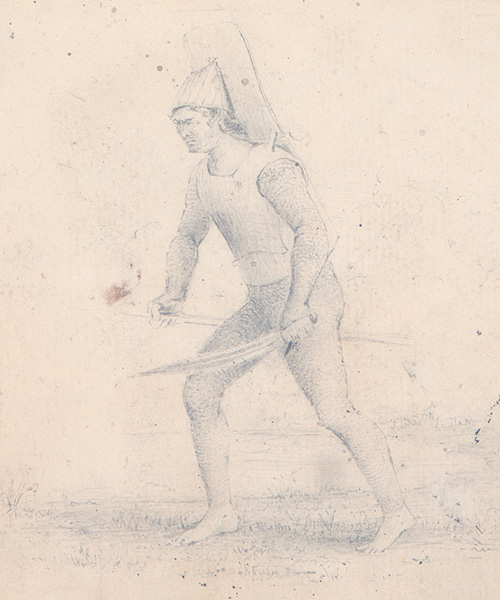
A drawing by Alfred Thomas Agate featuring a warrior of Drummond Island in 1841

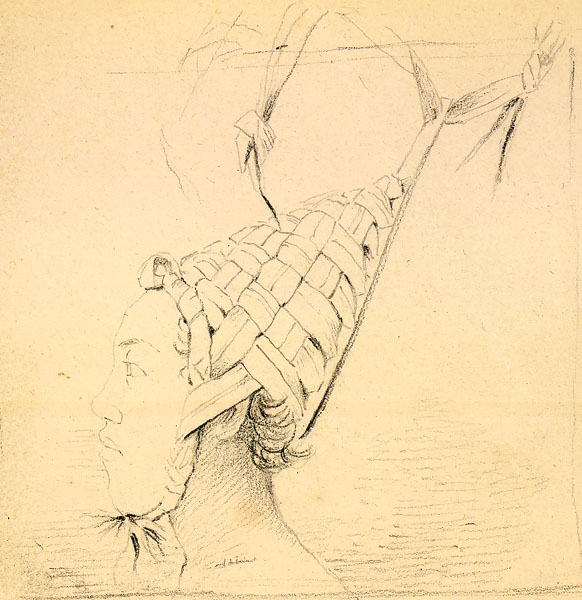
Drawing of a native of the island, showing his distinctive conical headdress; drawn by Alfred Thomas Agate
