= Terikiai =

- Interactive map of Terikiai
- Coordinates: 1°10′S 174°43′E
- Country: Kiribati
- Local council: North Tabiteuea
- Time zone: UTC+12:00

Terikiai is a settlement in Kiribati. It is located on an atoll; to its west are Nuribenua, Tanaiang, and Te Kapuipui, and to its east are Eita and Utiroa.

== Education ==
Terikiai has one elementary school, Takoronga School, which also serves a portion of Eita; this is done to relieve the elementary school in Eita, Temwamwang School. The area junior high school is Takoronga School in Terikiai, and the area senior high school is Tabiteuea North Senior Secondary School a.k.a. Teabike College in Eita.
