= Joseph Bach (bishop) =

French cleric and bishop

Joseph Bach M.S.C.
- Vicar Apostolic of Gilbert Islands
- Church: Catholic Church
- See: Apostolic Vicariate of Gilbert Islands
- In office: 26 January 1927 – 27 December 1933
- Predecessor: Joseph-Marie Leray
- Successor: Octave Terrienne
- Other post: Titular Bishop of Eriza (1927-1943)

Orders
- Ordination: 30 May 1896
- Consecration: 29 May 1927 by Bartolomeo Cattaneo

Personal details
- Born: 1 September 1872 Urmatt, Imperial Territory of Alsace–Lorraine, German Empire
- Died: 22 May 1943 (aged 70)

Joseph Bach (born 1 September 1872 in Urmatt; died 22 May 1943) was a French clergyman and bishop for the Apostolic Vicariate of Gilbert Islands. He was appointed bishop in 1927. He died in 1943.
