= The Church of Jesus Christ of Latter-day Saints in Micronesia =

The Church of Jesus Christ of Latter-day Saints in Micronesia may refer to:

- The Church of Jesus Christ of Latter-day Saints in Kiribati
- The Church of Jesus Christ of Latter-day Saints in Nauru
- The Church of Jesus Christ of Latter-day Saints in Palau
- The Church of Jesus Christ of Latter-day Saints in the Federated States of Micronesia
- The Church of Jesus Christ of Latter-day Saints in the Mariana Islands (Guam & Northern Mariana Islands)
- The Church of Jesus Christ of Latter-day Saints in the Marshall Islands
