= Taku, Kiribati =

Coordinates: 1°31′S 175°04′E

Taku
- Interactive map of Taku
- Country: Kiribati
- Islands: Gilbert Islands
- Atoll: Tabiteuea

Population
  - Total: 151

Taku is a village on Tabiteuea, atoll in Kiribati. There are 151 residents of the village (2017 census). The nearest village is Katabanga to the north. Apart from small breaks, the whole coastline from on the lagoon side is eroding as the result of wave action.
