= Our Lady of the Rosary Church, Koinawa =

Our Lady of the Rosary Church
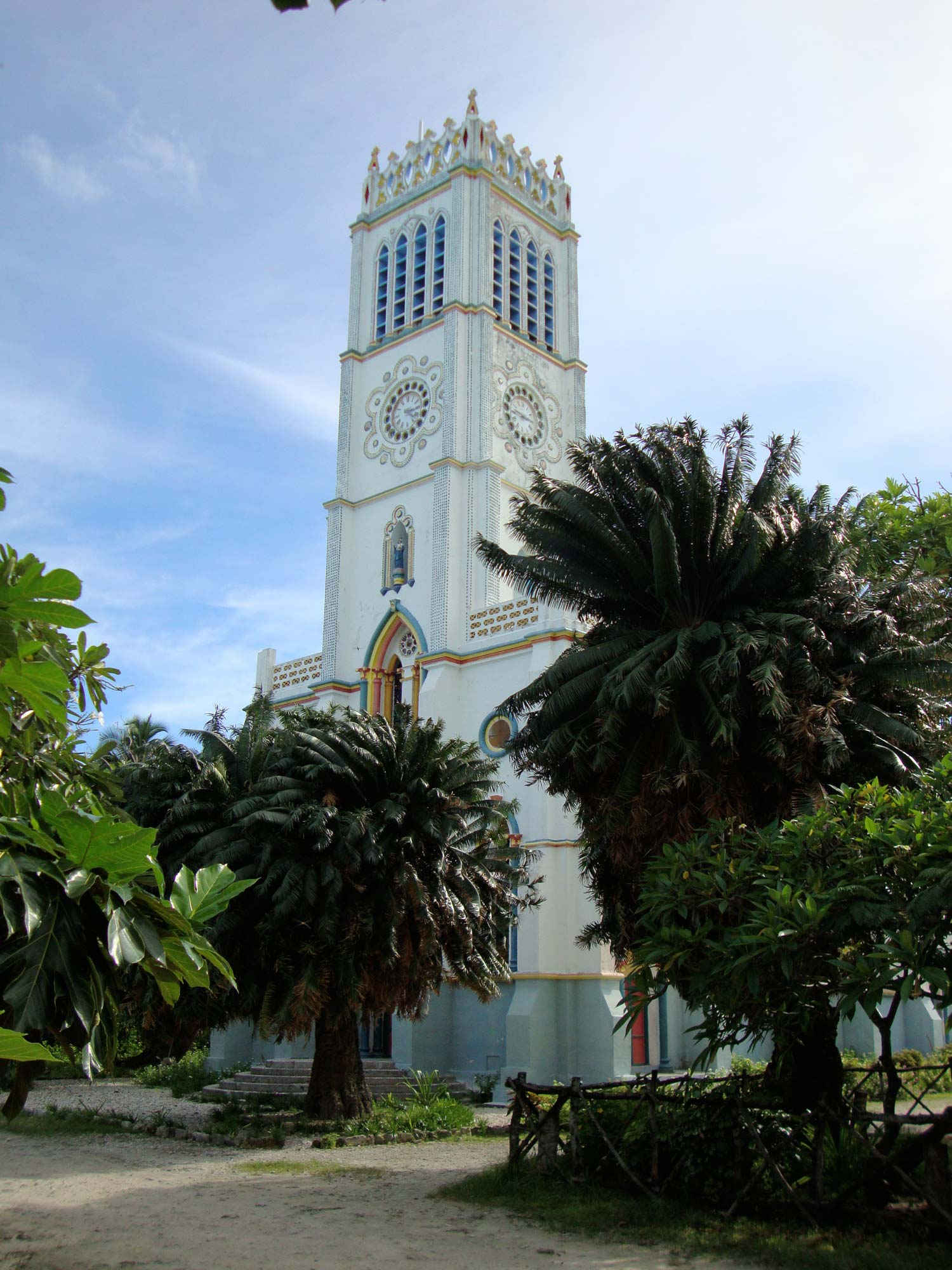
- Our Lady of the Rosary Church, Koinawa
- Our Lady of the Rosary Church
- 1°51′53.219″N 172°59′17.603″E
- Location: Koinawa
- Country: Kiribati
- Denomination: Roman Catholic Church

The Our Lady of the Rosary Church also called the Catholic Church of Our Lady of the Rosary, is a religious building that is affiliated with the Catholic Church and is located in the town of Koinawa in the east of Abaiang Atoll, in the north of the Gilbert Islands in the country of Kiribati, Oceania.

== History ==
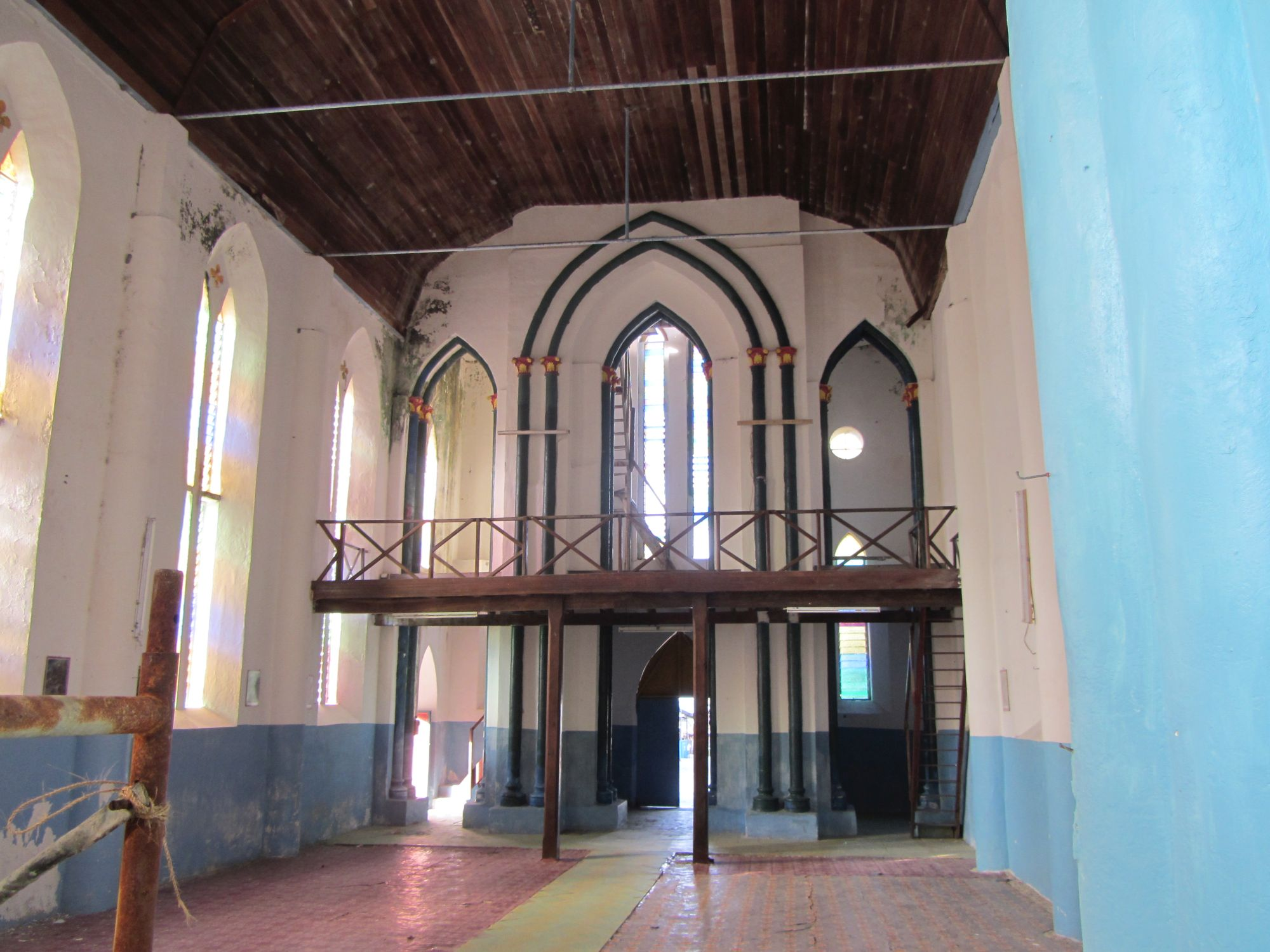
Church interior

The church was completed in October 1907 when the territory was a protectorate of the United Kingdom and the promotion of a priest from Belgium. The church follows the Roman or Latin rite and is within the Diocese of Tarawa and Nauru (Dioecesis Taravana et Nauruna), which began as the Diocese of Tarawa in 1966 and was created by Pope Paul VI by bula "Prophetarum voces".

== See also ==
- Roman Catholicism in Kiribati
- Catholic Church in Kiribati
