= Battle of Drummond's Island =

Conflict between the United States Exploring Expedition and the village of Utiroa

Coordinates: 1°21′00″N 174°48′00″E

- Part of the United States Exploring Expedition
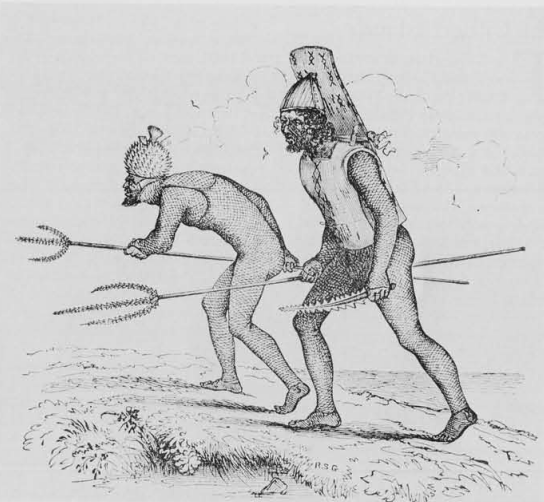
- Drummond Island warriors, drawn by Alfred Agate
Date	April 9, 1841
Location	Drummond's Island, Gilbert Islands
Result	American victory

Belligerents
United States Navy	Island natives

Commanders and leaders
William L. Hudson; William M. Walker	Unknown

Strength
20 marines; 62 sailors; 1 sloop-of-war; 1 schooner; 7 armed boats	~600 warriors

Casualties and losses
0 killed; 7 armed boats damaged	20 killed

The Battle of Drummond's Island was a conflict between the United States Exploring Expedition and the village of Utiroa in April 1841 at Drummond's Island, Tabiteuea North, which is now part of Tabiteuea. The cause of the conflict was the disappearance of the American seaman John Anderson, who was suspected, with no evidence, to have been murdered by the village natives. In retaliation, the members of the expedition killed twelve of the natives and burned the village of Utiroa to the ground.

== Background ==
The twenty-two gun sloop-of-war USS Peacock was commanded by Lieutenant William L. Hudson, the second in command of the United States Exploring Expedition. Charles Wilkes had ordered Hudson to explore Drummond's Island, named after a member of the expedition. Lieutenant Hudson learned from a member of his crew that a merchant ship had wrecked on a reef off the island's northwest coast years before. Most of its crew were massacred, except for a "white woman" and a child, who was supposed to still be alive. On 3 April, the Peacock anchored off Utiroa on Drummond's Island. Hudson went ashore with a couple of Navy officers, a marine detachment, as well as the Scientific Corps.

Initially, the natives were described as calm and peaceful, gathered in their huge maneaba, "far exceeding in size any they had before met with"; they led the Americans to their village centre. Tabiteuea means "chiefs are forbidden" in Gilbertese, and the natives themselves practiced egalitarianism, which meant the Americans had no tribal chief, or leader, to consult with.

Utiroa was said to be where the massacre had taken place. Other than studying the flora and fauna of the island, Hudson wanted to inquire about the shipwreck and the stranded woman and child. The natives spoke nothing of the incident but "parts of the vessel were found" inside the village's huts, though most of the buildings were deemed off-limits.

The Americans returned to their ship after several hours but returned the next day, April 7. All was well until Lieutenant Hudson and his men were on their way back to the Peacock. They noticed that a member of the procession, seaman John Anderson, was missing. A search was undertaken which went unnoticed by the Gilbertese, who appeared to be arming themselves with swords, spears, and other weapons.

Eventually, the search was discontinued. As the Americans were boarding their gig and armed boats, the natives tried to surround the sailors and marines. The natives threw rocks and waved their weapons as the boats shoved off. No one was harmed; Lieutenant Hudson decided to wait for Anderson until April 9, by which time the USS Flying Fish had arrived.

== Battle ==
After it became apparent that the sailor would not return, Hudson attacked the town to administer punishment against the natives. About eighty marines and sailors under Lieutenant William M. Walker of the Marine Corps were divided into three sections and landed at daylight. Meanwhile, the Peacock maneuvered into firing position off Utiroa and the Flying Fish covered the landing of men in seven boats. In case the landing party was overwhelmed, the schooner would provide covering fire and rescue the survivors.

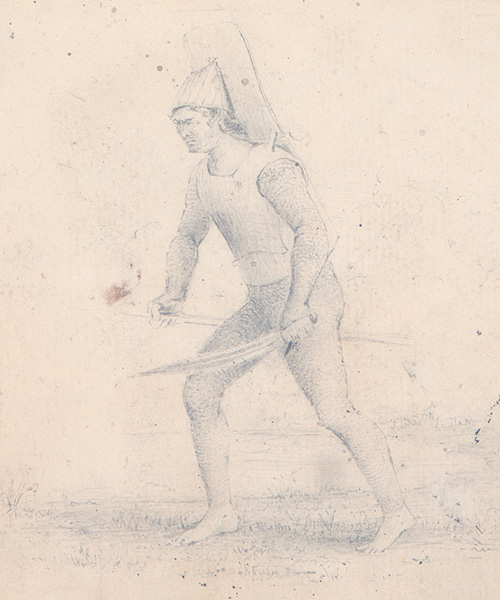
Warrior drawn by Alfred Agate

Around 700 Gilbertese warriors were dancing in the jungle near the beach and as the boats pulled in, Lieutenant Walker demanded they let Seaman Anderson go. However, the demand was ignored and the natives entered the water and headed for the boats, forcing them to retreat for a short distance. After this Walker turned his boats around and opened fire with a rocket at the mass of warriors. He then ordered his men to begin volley fire and devastated the natives according to the Peacock's log book. A little while later the natives "fled to the bush" so the American vessels pulled in close to shore, within "pistol shot" range. Then the landing was made.

The Gilbertese were not gone for long. Many returned to defend their villages and they unsuccessfully skirmished with Americans for hours. When all the buildings of Utiroa were burned, Walker and his men moved on to another nearby village and destroyed it as well. They then tried to inquire about the shipwrecked survivors but again nothing was uncovered so Lieutenant Walker led his men back to the boats.

There were no American combat casualties, but the armed boats were damaged in some way during the action, and they were repaired aboard USS Peacock as she sailed to rejoin Commander Wilkes in the sloop-of-war USS Vincennes with the USS Flying Fishing company. Approximately 20 islanders were killed in the fighting and others were wounded. Later during the expedition, the Peacock sank without loss of life in July 1841, while sailing into the mouth of the Columbia River.

== Similar expeditions ==
- First Sumatran Expedition of 1832
- Second Sumatran Expedition of 1838–1839
- First Fiji Expedition of 1855
- Second Fiji Expedition of 1859
- Nukapu Expedition of 1871–1872
