= Kabuna, Kiribati =

Kabuna
- Interactive map of Kabuna
- Country: Kiribati
- Islands: Gilbert Islands
- Atoll: Tabiteuea

Population
  - Total: 202

Kabuna is a village on Tabiteuea atoll in Kiribati. There are 202 residents of the village (2010 census). The nearest village is Taumwa to the north; and Tanaatoorua to the south. Apart from small breaks, the whole coastline from on the lagoon side is eroding as the result of wave action.
