= Diocese of Tarawa and Nauru =

Latin Catholic diocese in the Pacific

Diocese of Tarawa and Nauru Dioecesis Taravana et Nauruna
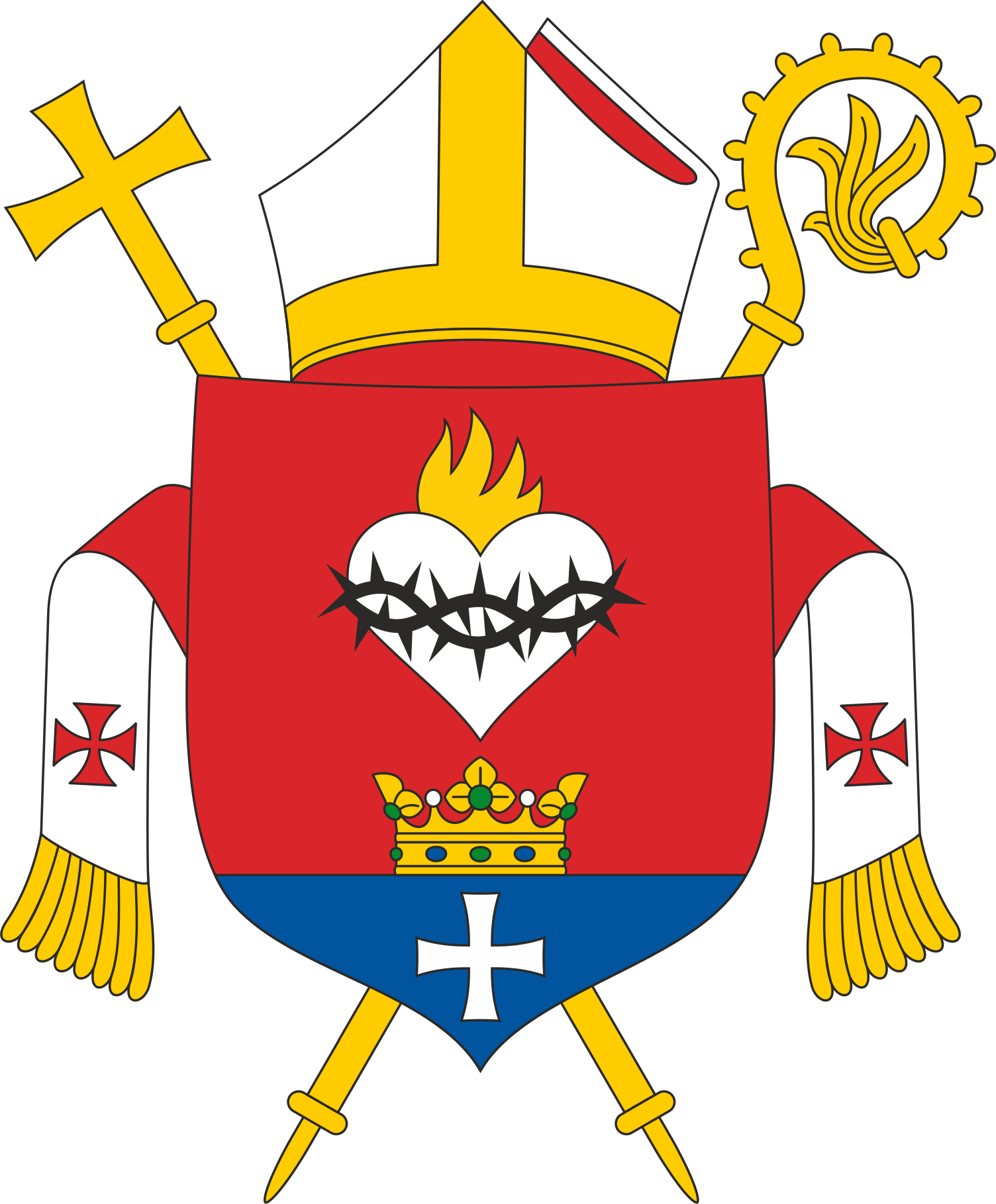
- Coat of arms of the Diocese

Location
- Country: Kiribati and Nauru
- Ecclesiastical province: Suva

Statistics
- Area: 320 sq mi (830 km^{2})
- Population: Total; Catholics: (as of 2014); 119,435; 63,644 (57 (53% with Nauru)%)
- Parishes: 22 (1 in Nauru)

Information
- Denomination: Catholic Church
- Sui iuris church: Latin Church
- Rite: Roman Rite
- Established: 28 June 1897
- Cathedral: Sacred Heart Cathedral
- Secular priests: 28

Current leadership
- Pope: Leo XIV
- Bishop: Simon Samendra Mani

The Diocese of Tarawa and Nauru (Latin: Dioecesis Taravana et Nauruna) in Kiribati and Nauru is a Latin Catholic suffragan diocese of the Archdiocese of Suva. It was erected as the Vicariate Apostolic of Gilbert Islands in 1897, with see in Tanaeang (on Tabiteuea) from 1936 to the end of 1950s, and later elevated to as the Diocese of Tarawa in 1966. There was a name change in 1978 and, in 1982, the diocese was split from the Mission sui iuris of Funafuti. The diocese currently has jurisdiction over all of Kiribati and Nauru.

== History ==
=== The first missionaries ===
The first Christian missionaries to arrive in the Gilbert Islands were Protestants from Hawaii and New England, the first of whom arrived in November 1857. The most notable of these missionaries was Hiram Bingham II, a Congregationalist minister and son of Hiram Bingham I, an early missionary in Hawaii. Bingham and his wife translated the Bible into Gilbertese, wrote school books, and authored a major dictionary (published posthumously), before leaving the islands in the early 1860s due to ill health.

In addition to Bingham's conversions, many of the Gilbertese natives had been taken by blackbirders in the 1870s to work on plantations on other islands in the Pacific, where they were met by Catholic missionaries. Two of these converted laborers, Betero and Tiroi, returned to Nonouti and instructed the local people about Catholicism. They built eight small churches, where people of different villages assembled each Sunday to sing hymns and recite prayers. By 1888, Betero and Tiroi had already baptized 560 people and were instructing and additional 600. As the number of Catholics grew, the two men wrote letters to many Catholic bishops requesting missionaries and priests.

=== Arrival of Catholic priests ===
In response to a letter Betero and Tiroi sent to Samoa, three members of the Missionaries of the Sacred Heart, Father E. Bontemps, Father Joseph Leray, and Brother Conrad Weber, left in a tiny schooner from Sydney in 1887 and arrived on Nonouti on the Feast of the Ascension, 10 May 1888. They anchored at the entrance of a wide, shallow lagoon, and took a dinghy to land on shore, where a crowd of local people were waiting. The trip to the shore was taking several hours, so the two priests decided to celebrate Mass on the dinghy some distance from land as it was close to midday. So the first Catholic Mass on the Gilbert Islands took place on a dinghy in the Nonouti lagoon. When the missionaries arrived on shore, they visited the church, which they found to be large and well built, and already equipped with an altar, altar cloth, and crucifix. The following morning, Mass was celebrated in the church, supplemented by Gilbertese hymns and prayers. After Mass, a statue of Our Lady of the Sacred Heart was placed in a visible location.

=== Arrival of religious sisters ===
In 1892, Father Bontemps, accompanied by two young Gilbertese men, left for Europe on a trip to gain assistance for the Gilbert Islands mission. They visited Rome, and in 1894 visited Issoudun, France, where the Daughters of Our Lady of the Sacred Heart, the sister congregation of the Missionaries of the Sacred Heart, had their convent. Bontemps asked the Superior General, Mother Marie Louise, for sisters for the Gilbert Islands. Marie Louise had long been a loyal helper of the Missionaries, but in this case she hesitated due to the exceptional isolation of the Gilbert Islands. However, she hesitantly agreed and named seven sisters, the oldest of whom was 25, to be sent to the islands.

Bontemps and the sisters left Issoudun in April 1895, and on the return trip stopped for a short stay with the sisters at Kensington, Australia. They also stopped in Sydney, where two more sisters joined them, bringing the total to nine. They arrived at the Gilbert Islands in August, after a difficult journey on the Archer, an old, slow, and unsteady ship, which had to be used because nobody wanted to risk a new ship in such rough and reef-strewn seas.

On 28 June 1897, it was established as Apostolic Vicariate of the Gilbert Islands (Insularum Gilbertinarum in Latin) from Apostolic Vicariate of New Pomerania.

=== Poverty and hostility from Protestants ===
Upon their arrival, both material and social conditions were difficult for the sisters. The sisters, who were active in education, faced much opposition from the Protestant teachers. In addition, they faced stark poverty. Upon the sisters' arrival at the mission house where the Missionaries of the Sacred Heart were living and where the sisters were to live, they found a kitchen equipped only with two small saucepans, a few plates, and a single spoon, to serve 12 missionaries. There were no cups or glasses, so the missionaries drank out of jam tins. They lived off of coconuts, taros, fish, black coffee, brown sugar, biscuits, boiled rice, tinned beans, and salted meat. Condensed milk and bread were treats saved for Sundays and feast days. The extreme heat, in addition to malnourishment and disease, caused a number of deaths during the early years; however, it took four months or longer for the news of this to reach Europe.

A second group of sisters arrived on Nonouti on 2 February 1899. Conditions were still very primitive and poor. During the sisters' early years in the Gilbert Islands, the young Superior, Mother Mary Isabel, as well as the priests, often traveled from Nonouti, the mission headquarters, to visit newly established missions on other islands in the chain. These voyages were hazardous and often very exciting.

On one occasion, Mother M. Isabel and Father Bontemps left Nonouti to visit a nearby island, but after two weeks of battling against wind and strong currents, landed in Nauru, 100 kilometers off course. The island's administrator invited them to come ashore, which Bontemps agreed to do the next morning. However, during the night, the current carried their vessel off to the Caroline Islands. There they were welcomed ashore by Spanish Capuchin missionaries, and were just in time for a feast and baptism of the native king and queen. Mother M. Isabel was given the honor of being godmother. After several days they set out for the Gilbert Islands, and sighted Nonouti on 27 June 1897 after an absence of five months.

In addition to material difficulties the missionaries faced, they faced hostile opposition from Protestants, at that time the dominant and established faith. Some of the inhabitants of the southern island of Nikunau asked for missionaries, so the next year a priest and two sisters were sent. They faced fierce opposition from the island's Protestants. Upon their arrival, they were forbidden to go ashore, a command which they disobeyed at risk of their safety. They were left stranded on the beach, with the few possessions they had amidst a crowd of hostile people. Nobody gave them any assistance until dusk, when a European trader took pity on them and allowed them to spend the night on his veranda. The next day the sisters went out to collect materials to build their house. The local policeman threatened imprisonment to anyone who would work with the missionaries, so they had to do the labor themselves. However, several years later conditions had improved to the point where the sisters were able to found a boarding school for girls.

=== 20th century ===
The Catholic mission's first inter-island ship was launched in 1938. It was built on the island of Abemama and was named Santa Teretia. Previously in 1894 the mission had bought a small ship, the Maris Stella, but it was sold in 1910 to help the mission through financial difficulty. Before 1894 and from 1910 to 1938, the Missionaries of the Sacred Heart had to rely on passing ships carrying copra or cargo in order to reach the various islands. Bishop Octave Terrienne established his vicariate on Tabiteuea North in 1938 The new ship was sold to a local company in 1950 and a larger ship, also named Santa Teretia, was bought from an Australian company. The new ship went aground in Nauru during a storm and could not be refloated. A third ship was bought, which also was sunk on a reef of one of the southern islands. In 1970 airstrips were built on all but one of the outer islands which made travel much more convenient for the priests and sisters.

On 21 June 1966, the Vicariate Apostolic of Gilbert Islands, of Bishop Pierre Guichet, vicariate which had existed since 1897, was elevated as the Diocese of Tawara. On 15 November 1978, its name was changed to the Diocese of Tarawa, Nauru and Funafuti, and on 10 September 1982, was changed to the Diocese of Tarawa and Nauru.

During the 20th century, the number of active clergy and religious sisters in the diocese grew quickly. In 1950, Bishop Octave Terrienne founded an indigenous congregation called the Sisters of St. Therese. And, in 1960, several indigenous girls asked to join the Daughters of Our Lady of the Sacred Heart and were sent to study at the sisters' Australian novitiate. As there were not many Sisters of St. Therese, they asked to join the Daughters of the Sacred Heart, and the merger happened in 1968. In 1976 the Daughters of the Sacred Heart established a novitiate in the Gilbertine Islands.

By 1970, there were nearly 25,000 Catholics in the diocese, nearly 45% of the population. By 2015 Census, Catholics made up 57% of the total population of Kiribati, numbering 63,116.

== Ordinaries ==
1. Joseph Leray, MSC (27 July 1897 – 1926)
2. Joseph Bach, MSC (26 January 1927 – 27 December 1933)
3. Octave Terrienne, MSC (2 December 1937 – 28 February 1961)
4. Pierre Guichet, MSC (19 July 1961 – 15 November 1978)
5. Paul Mea, MSC (15 November 1978 – 29 June 2020)
6. Koru Tito (29 June 2020 – 6 August 2022) (elected)
7. Simon Samendra Mani (2 May 2024 - )

== Churches ==
- Our Lady of the Rosary Church, Koinawa

== See also ==
- Religion in Nauru
- Catholic Church in Nauru
