= Islam in Nauru =

Islam in Nauru is a minority religion. In Nauru, there are approximately 100 Muslims, which amounts to 0.84% of the country’s total population. The majority of the population in Nauru adheres to various forms of Christianity.

== History ==
Islam began to gain a significant presence in Nauru in the late 20th to early 21st century, largely through the arrival of migrants from Iran, Iraq, Somalia and Pakistan. Under the provisions of the Pacific Agreement, during the period from 2001 to 2008, Nauru accepted approximately 300 Iraqis and 1300 Afghans; these individuals were accommodated in a refugee camp located at the Nauru State Palace, adjacent to the Meneng Stadium.

== Today situation ==
In 2005, about 100 Muslims reside in Nauru, predominantly migrants from Iran, Iraq, Somalia and Pakistan. Both Sunni and Shia communities are present on the island, although, despite there being no restrictions on constructing places of worship, there is no mosque in Nauru.

Despite the predominance of Christianity in Nauru, there are no indications of widespread social discrimination against the Muslim minority.

== See also ==
- Islam in Oceania
- Islam in the United States
- Religion in Nauru
