= Utiroa =

- Location within Kiribati Location within North Pacific
- Coordinates: 1°13′N 174°45′E
- Country: Kiribati
- Atoll: Tabiteuea
- Council: North Tabiteuea
- Island: Aanikai

Population (2020)
  - Total: 774

Utiroa is a settlement in Kiribati. It is located on Tabiteuea atoll and is the capital of North Tabiteuea; Nuribenua is to its west, while Terikiai and Eita are to its north.

== Education ==
Utiroa is served by Temwamwang School in Eita. The area junior high school is Takoronga School in Terikiai, and the area senior high school is Tabiteuea North Senior Secondary School a.k.a. Teabike College in Eita.

== History ==
This settlement was the site of the Battle of Drummond's Island in 1841, when members of the scientific United States Exploring Expedition attacked and burned the village after the suspected murder of a crew member by the natives.
