= Bureieta Karaiti =

Bureieta Karaiti was the general secretary of the Kiribati Protestant Church (KPC), the second-largest religious group in Kiribati.

As a representative of the KPC, Karaiti has spoken out against the exploitation of i-Kiribati women and girls as prostitutes and the dangers posed to Kiribati and other Pacific islands by global warming.
