= Buariki (Tabiteuea) =

- Village
- Location in Kiribati
- Coordinates: 01°20′32″N 174°50′00″E
- Country: Kiribati
- Island group: Gilbert Islands
- Atoll: Tabiteuea

Area
  - Total: 1.0 km^{2} (0.39 sq mi)
- Elevation: 1 m (3.3 ft)

Population (2020)
  - Total: 482
  - Density: 480/km^{2} (1,200/sq mi)

Buariki is a settlement in Kiribati. It is located on a Tabiteuea atoll; It serves as the capital of Tabiteuea South district. Nikutoru is to its east and Taungaeaka to its north.
