= Arubo =

Settlement in Nauru

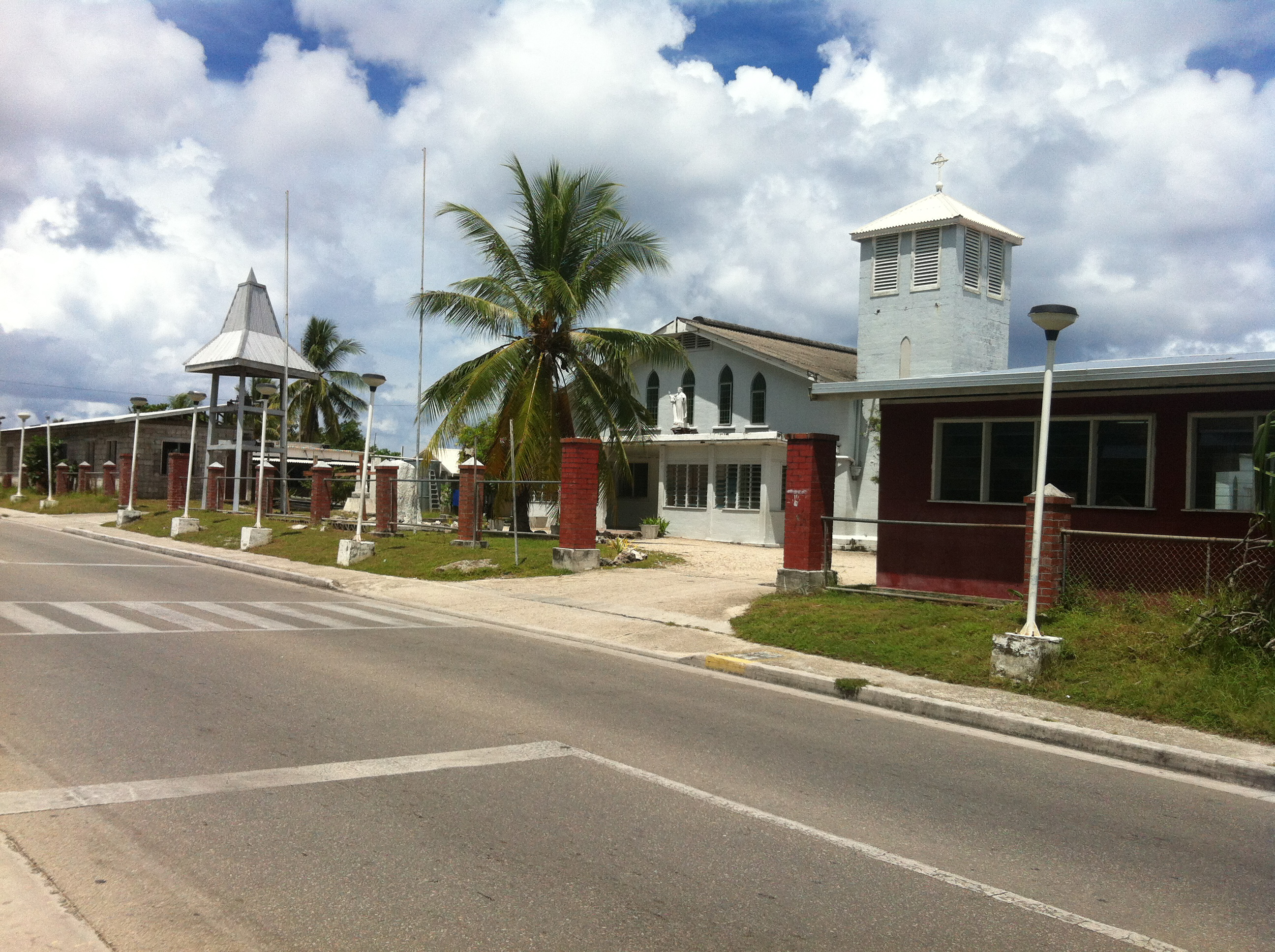
- Catholic Church in Arubo
- Interactive map of Arubo
- Country: Nauru

Arubo is a village in Ewa District, Nauru. It is the northernmost village in the Country. Arubo has a Catholic church, the Christ the King Church, Arubo.
