= Koru Tito =

Roman Catholic priest (1960–2022)

Monsignor Koru Tito
- Bishop-elect of Tarawa and Nauru
- Church: Catholic Church
- Diocese: Diocese of Tarawa and Nauru
- Appointed: 29 June 2020
- Predecessor: Paul Mea
- Previous post: Vicar general of the Diocese of Tarawa and Nauru

Orders
- Ordination: 20 June 1987

Personal details
- Born: 30 September 1960 Buota, North Tabiteuea, Gilbert Islands
- Died: 7 August 2022 (aged 61) South Tarawa, Kiribati
- Education: Pontifical Angelicum University

Koru Tito (30 September 1960 – 7 August 2022) was an I-Kiribati priest of the Roman Catholic Church who was appointed bishop of the Diocese of Tarawa and Nauru on 29 June 2020 but was not consecrated a bishop before his death.

== Biography ==
Tito was born on 30 September 1960 in North Tabiteuea, in the Gilbert and Ellice Islands of present-day Kiribati. He earned a diploma in education at the University of the South Pacific in Suva (1977–1979). He completed his philosophical and theological studies at the Pacific Regional Seminary in Fiji (1981–1985). Tito was ordained a priest of the Diocese of Tarawa and Nauru on 20 June 1987. He was the youngest of 10 siblings from his father (Tito) and mother (Ioana).

Tito spent a year at St. Paul's National Seminary in Kensington, New South Wales (1990–1991). He obtained a doctorate in theology with a specialization in spirituality at the Pontifical Angelicum University in Rome.

After ordination he served in the following roles:

- 1987–1989: Parish priest in the islands of Beru, Nikunau and Onotoa;
- 1990–1991: Assistant in St. Andrew's Clayton South Parish, in Victoria, Australia;
- 1991–1993: Parish priest in the islands of Kuria, Aranuka and Abemama;
- 1993–2000: Licentiate and Doctoral studies in Spiritual Theology at the Pontifical University of Saint Thomas Aquinas, Rome;
- 2001–2008: Professor at the Pacific Regional Seminary;
- 2008–2010: Assistant at the Parish Cathedral of Tarawa and Nauru;
- 2010–2020: Vicar general of the Diocese of Tarawa and Nauru.

Pope Francis appointed him Bishop of Tarawa and Nauru on 29 June 2020. At the time of his appointment Tito was not in good health. He twice received dispensations from the requirement that he be consecrated a bishop without three months of his appointment because of travel restrictions imposed in the Pacific region due to the COVID-19 pandemic. In September 2020 he was diagnosed with serious kidney and heart problems. He was treated with some success in Kiribati, Fiji and New Zealand. He returned to Tarawa on 2 July and died there in the early hours of 7 August 2022 in Tungaru Central Hospital.

== See also ==
- Religion in Nauru
- Catholic Church in Nauru
