= Nauru Congregational Church =

Religious denomination in Nauru

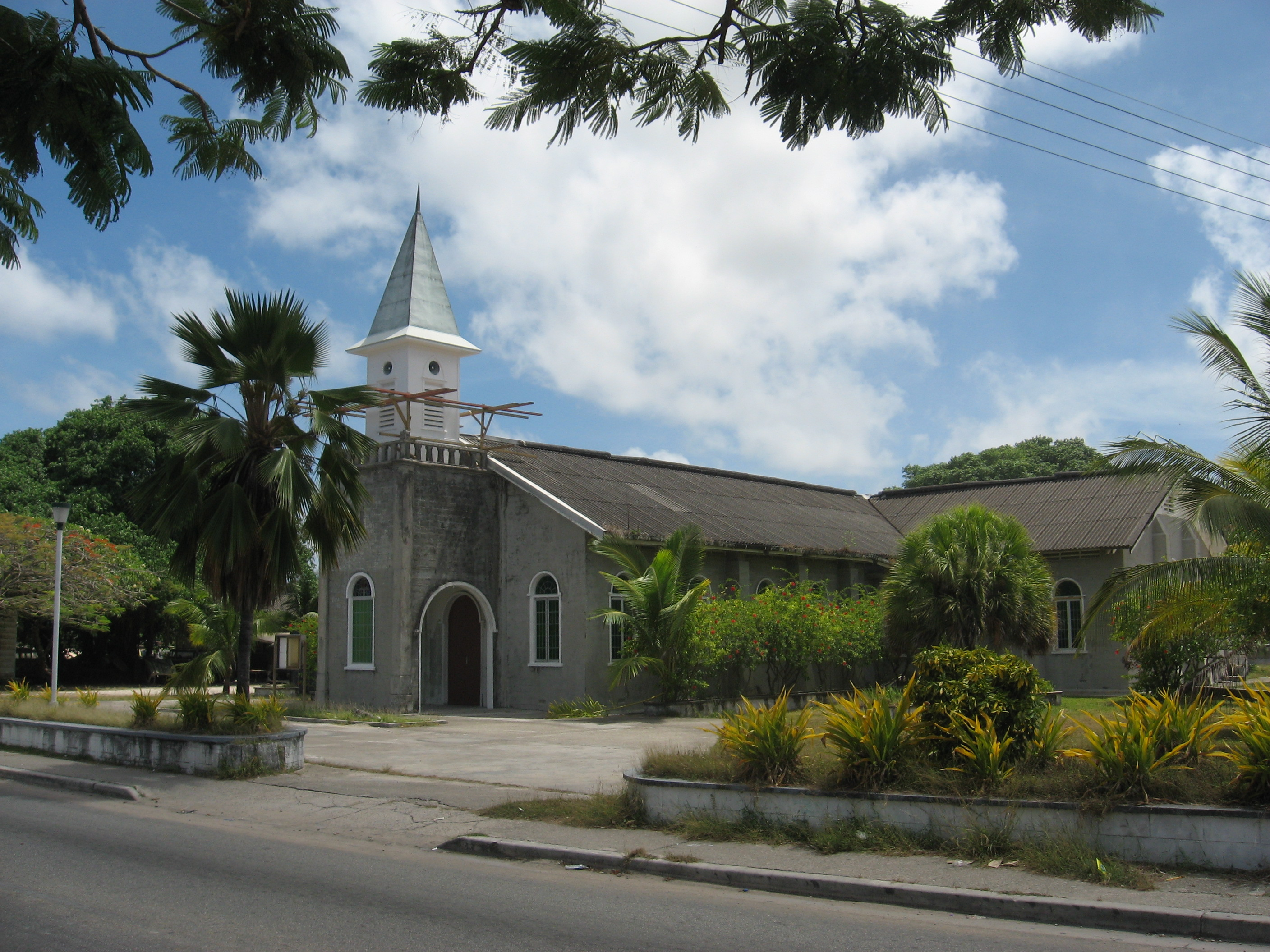
Nauru Congregational Church in Aiwo District

The Nauru Congregational Church (NCC) is the largest religious denomination in Nauru, claiming as members approximately 60% of Nauru's population of about 10,000.

In the 2011 census, it was noted that those affiliating to the NCC made up 35.7% of the island's population, 3,552 out of 9,945 people. In the following census, 10 years later in 2021, 4,001 people, out of a population of 11,680 people (34.3%) claimed affiliation with the NCC. This was followed very closely by the Roman Catholic Church with 3,959 (33.9%).

The NCC is a Protestant Congregationalist denomination. It has seven congregations in Nauru. Each of the congregations is headed by a deacon. Rene Harris, a former president of Nauru, has served as the general secretary of the church.

In 2015, Pastor Wanda Joleen Hiram and Pastor Ruth Omodien Garabwan became the first women to be ordained as ministers in the NCC.

== See also ==
- Religion in Nauru
