= Joseph Leray =

French clergyman

Joseph Leray (born in 1854 in Montoir-de-Bretagne) was a French clergyman and bishop for the Roman Catholic Diocese of Tarawa and Nauru. He was appointed bishop in 1897. He died in 1929.
