= Urmatt =

- Commune
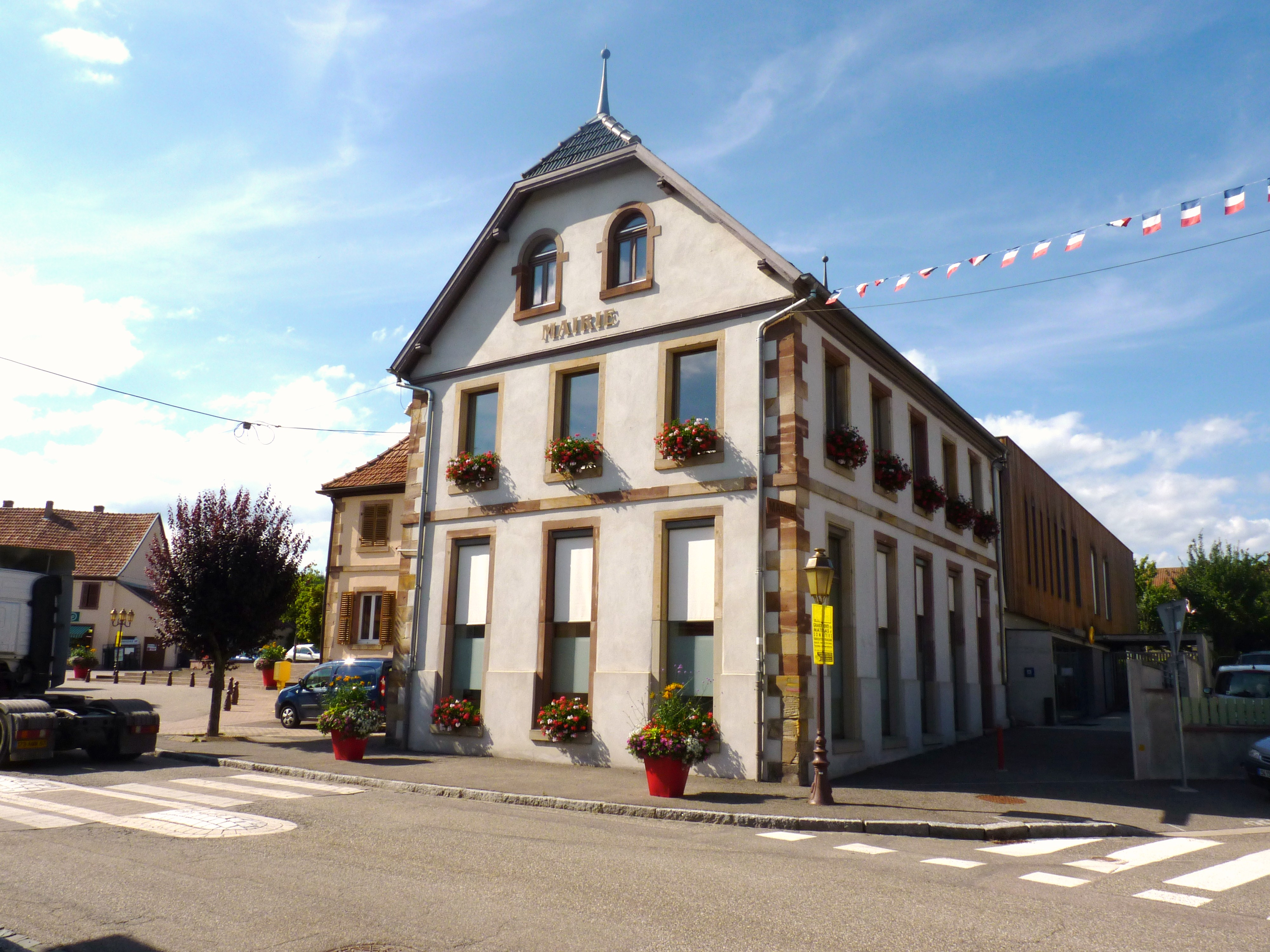
- The town hall in Urmatt

- Coat of arms
- Location of Urmatt
- Location within France Location within Grand Est
- Coordinates: 48°31′40″N 7°19′32″E
- Country: France
- Region: Grand Est
- Department: Bas-Rhin
- Arrondissement: Molsheim
- Canton: Mutzig

Government
  - Mayor (2020–2026): Alain Grisé
- Area^{1}: 13.83 km^{2} (5.34 sq mi)
- Highest elevation: 900 m (3,000 ft)
- Lowest elevation: 224 m (735 ft)
- Population (2023): 1,505
  - Density: 108.8/km^{2} (281.8/sq mi)
- Time zone: UTC+01:00 (CET)
  - Summer (DST): UTC+02:00 (CEST)
- INSEE/Postal code: 67500 /67280
- ^{1} French Land Register data, which excludes lakes, ponds, glaciers > 1 km^{2} (0.386 sq mi or 247 acres) and river estuaries.

Urmatt (French pronunciation: [yʁmat]) is a commune in the Bas-Rhin department in Grand Est in north-eastern France.

== See also ==
- Communes of the Bas-Rhin department
