= The Church of Jesus Christ of Latter-day Saints in Nauru =

- Area: Pacific
- Members: 146 (2025)
- Branches: 1

The Church of Jesus Christ of Latter-day Saints in Nauru refers to the Church of Jesus Christ of Latter-day Saints (LDS Church) and its members in Nauru. A branch was organized in 1984 with 16 members. It now has 146 members.

== History ==
Membership in Nauru
Year	Membership
1984	16
1989	40
1999	96
2009	108
2019	126
2025	146

Church members began moving to Nauru in the early 1980s for employment. Church meetings were initially conducted in their homes. In April of 1984, Joseph B. Keeler, president of the Micronesia Guam Mission, visited Nauru, in which a branch was organized with 16 members. This branch became part of the Suva Fiji Mission on July 1, 1986.

Church membership increases and declines with the demand of the phosphate rock, the island's chief export. Because of restrictions on proselytizing, church representatives are only allowed temporary visits to the island. The first couple to make periodic visits was Raymond and Lorraine Schmedes beginning in 1998. They assisted in establishing a Relief Society, Primary, and a seminary program. In February of 1999, the branch became part of the Tarawa Gilbert Islands district.

== Congregations ==
Nauru has a single branch, the Nauru Branch. This branch is administered by the Marshall Islands/Kiribati Mission.

== Missions ==
Nauru is located in the Marshall Islands/Kiribati Mission.

== Temples ==
As of August 2026, Nauru was located within the Suva Fiji Temple district. Due to its location within the Marshall Islands/Kiribati Mission, it is anticipated it will be in the Tarawa Kiribati Temple district after it is dedicated.

== See also ==
- Religion in Nauru
