= Pierre Guichet =

French bishop of the Gilbert Islands (1915-1989)

Pierre Auguste Antoine Marie Guichet M.S.C.
- Bishop of Tarawa
- Church: Catholic Church
- Diocese: Diocese of Tarawa
- In office: 19 July 1961 – 15 November 1978
- Predecessor: Octave Terrienne
- Successor: Paul Mea
- Previous post: Titular Bishop of Stectorium (1961-1966)

Orders
- Ordination: 24 March 1946
- Consecration: 18 November 1961 by Jean Villepelet

Personal details
- Born: 21 January 1915 Saint-Hilaire-de-Clisson, Loire-Inférieure, France
- Died: 6 October 1989 (aged 74) Brive-la-Gaillarde, Limousin, France

Pierre Auguste Antoine Marie Guichet, MSC, MBE (21 January 1915 – 6 October 1989) was the Catholic bishop of the Diocese of Tarawa from 1961 to 1978, when Paul Mea succeeded him.

He was titular bishop of Stectorium from 1961 to 1966 as Vicar Apostolic of the Gilbert and Ellice Islands, until it was elevated as the Diocese of Tarawa in Teaoraereke in 1966.

He was ordained a priest on 24 March 1946, was the superior of the Mission of Melanesia, and consecrated bishop on 18 November 1961.

== See also ==
- 1975 New Year Honours
