= Kiribati Uniting Church =

United Protestant Christian denomination in Kiribati

The Kiribati Uniting Church (KUC) (until 2014 the Kiribati Protestant Church and earlier, the Gilbert Islands Protestant Church) is a united Protestant Christian denomination in Kiribati. With approximately 25,000 members, and 136 congregations, the KUC is the second-largest religious group in Kiribati and accounts for approximately 21 percent of the population of the country.

== History ==
Because of their remoteness and the few European presence, the Gilbert and Ellice Islands were ignored by Christian missions until the latter half of the 19th century. Protestant missionaries (e.g., Hiram Bingham) sent by the American Board of Commissioners for Foreign Missions first arrived in Kiribati in 1857, and missionaries from the London Missionary Society arrived in 1870. The Protestant converts were served by pastors from Hawaii, Samoa and Tuvalu until the early 20th century, after which Tuvaluans and I-Kiribati, trained at Rongorongo, on Beru Atoll, took on this role. In 1968, the first general assembly of the Gilbert Islands Protestant Church met to organise an autonomous church. In 1979, when the Gilbert Islands was renamed Kiribati, the church changed its name to the Kiribati Protestant Church. The church was originally established as a Congregationalist denomination.

== 21st century ==
In 2014, after a Church Bi-annual Assembly (Maungatabu), which was held on the island of Arorae, the Kiribati Protestant Church changed its name to Kiribati Uniting Church. The word "uniting" reflects that the church is now a union of several Protestant denominations in Kiribati, including Congregationalists, Evangelicals, Anglicans, and Presbyterians. But 10,000 members, mainly Congregationalists, did not accept the move and recreated a separate Kiribati Protestant Church.

The current head of KUC, called Moderator, is Reirei Kouraabi.

KUC has 209 pastors. The majority of church members are fisherman or copra cutters. Membership is decreasing since the move of 2014.

The KUC is a member of the World Council of Churches, the World Communion of Reformed Churches, and the Council for World Mission. The pastors for the KUC are trained at Tangintebu Theological College, which is owned by the church.

== See also ==
- Bureieta Karaiti
