= Octave Terrienne =

French bishop of the Gilbert Islands

Octave Marie Terrienne M.S.C.
- Vicar Apostolic of Gilbert Islands
- Church: Catholic Church
- See: Apostolic Vicariate of Gilbert Islands
- In office: 2 December 1937 – 28 February 1961
- Predecessor: Joseph Bach
- Successor: Pierre Guichet
- Other post: Titular Bishop of Menelaites (1937-1994)

Orders
- Ordination: 27 January 1929
- Consecration: 25 June 1938 by Jean Villepelet

Personal details
- Born: 9 September 1902 Bouvron, Loire-Inférieure, France
- Died: 4 March 1994 (aged 91) Marseille, Provence-Alpes-Côte d'Azur, France

Octave Marie Terrienne MSC (9 September 1902 – 4 March 1994) was the Roman Catholic bishop of the apostolic vicariate of the Gilbert Islands from 1937 until 1961, when Pierre Guichet succeeded him.

He was bishop of Menelaites (a titular see) from 1938 to 1961 as Vicar Apostolic of the Gilbert and Ellice Islands. After building there the biggest church of the colony in 1936, Bishop Terrienne established the vicariate see in Tanaeang, on North Tabiteuea, instead of Ocean Island, headquarters of the British Colony, or Tarawa, the former capital, where it was transferred at the end of 1950s.

He was ordained Priest on 27 January 1929 and consecrated Bishop on 25 June 1938 at Nantes Cathedral. He was then the youngest Roman Catholic bishop at only 36.
