= Religion in Nauru =

Religion in Nauru, based on the 2021 census
1. Nauru Congregational Church (34.3%)
2. Catholicism (33.9%)
3. Assemblies of God (11.7%)
4. Nauru Independent Church (3.50%)
5. Pacific Light House Church (6.00%)
6. Other (Other Christian denominations or not stated (7.30%)

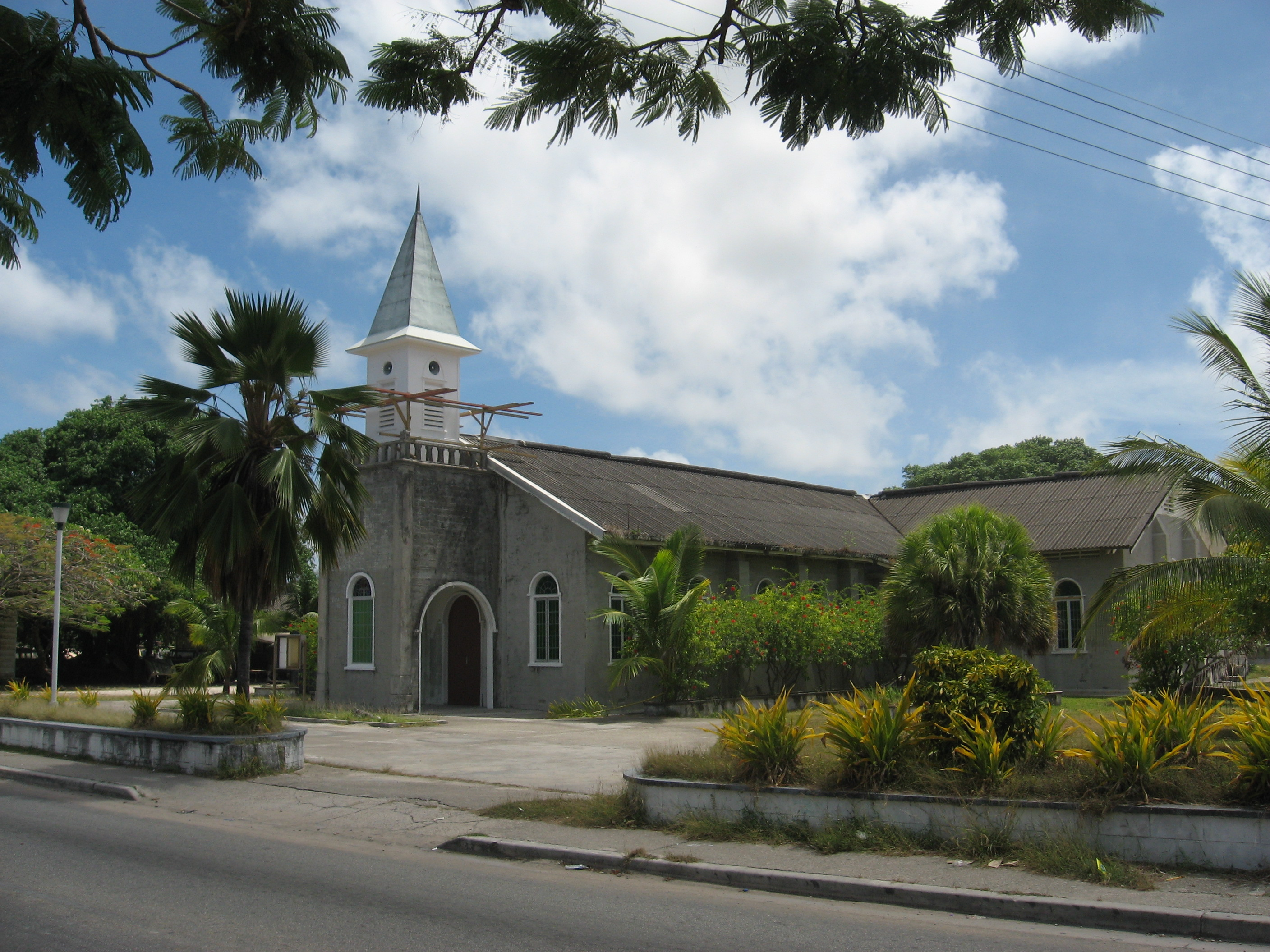
Church in Nauru

Christianity is the largest religion in Nauru, with Nauru Congregational Church and Catholicism being the largest denominations, encompassing 34.3% and 33.9% of the population respectively as of the 2021 census.

Freedom of religion is a constitutional right, and the country's laws and society uphold this right without any significant breaches.

== Demographics ==
According to the 2021 census, the island was predominantly Christian with 34.3% following the Nauru Congregational Church down from 35.7% in 2011 Census; 33.9% following Catholicism up from 33.0% in 2011 Census. The Assemblies of God also shown decline from 13.0% in 2011 to 11.7% in 2021. The biggest decline was for the Nauru Independent Church which saw a decline from 9.5% to 3.5%. The Pacific Light House Church is followed by 6%. Members of the Seventh-day Adventists, Baptists, Other Protestants and Brethren Church are followed by 1.4%, 1.5%, 1.1% and 0.4% respectively.

The Census also noted 1.3% of the population doesn't profess any religion and 0.05% following Hinduism.

The ethnic Chinese people living on the island (approximately 5% of the population) were mainly Confucian, Buddhist, Taoist, Christian, or nonreligious.

The largely Christian communities of Tuvaluan and I-Kiribati expatriates were repatriated in late 2006 following the near cessation of phosphate mining in the country.

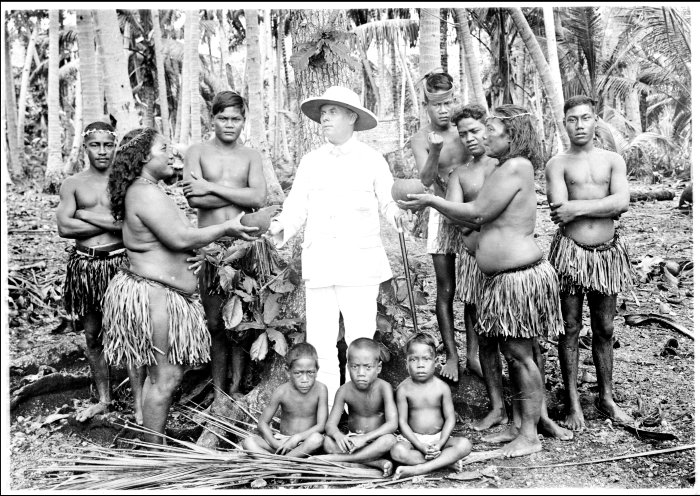
A welcome ceremony for a missionary, 1916–17

Nauruan indigenous religion was the predominant religion in Nauru before the late nineteenth and early twentieth centuries, when foreign missionaries introduced Christianity to the island. In the early 2000s, there were a few active Christian missionary organisations, including representatives of Anglicanism, Methodism, and Catholicism.

According to data from Pew Research, the religions of Hinduism, Judaism, and Islam had a small presence in the island, with about 0.1% of the population (fewer than ten people), adhering to each faith. With the exception of detainees in Nauru Regional Processing Centre, in which majority are Muslims, with significant minority of Buddhists and Hindus, although the population were slowly decreasing due to re-settlement program by the Australian Government.

== Religious freedom ==
The constitution of Nauru provides for freedom of conscience, thought, and religion, as well as freedom to change one’s religion or beliefs.

Religious groups are required to register with the government in order to proselytize, build houses of worship, hold religious services, or officiate marriages. As of 2022, religious groups are required to have 750 members to register. In the past, local religious leaders noted that in practice the only activity which is restricted for unregistered groups is marriage officiation.

Religious groups are allowed to operate private schools. In public schools, religious groups are allowed to provide religious studies courses once a week during school hours, but they are not required to do this. Students are expected to attend courses pertaining to their chosen religious denomination; other students are expected to use the time as an independent study period.

According to a 2022 US government report, there are no significant societal limits on religious freedom in Nauru. In the past, some elements of the Nauru Protestant and Roman Catholic communities have occasionally voiced discomfort with religious groups they perceived as foreign, in particular the LDS Church and the Jehovah's Witnesses.

== See also ==
- Catholic Church in Nauru
- The Church of Jesus Christ of Latter-day Saints in Nauru
- The Church of Jesus Christ of Latter-day Saints in Micronesia (disambiguation) for the LDS Church elsewhere in Micronesia.
  - The Church of Jesus Christ of Latter-day Saints membership statistics § Countries
