= North Tabiteuea =

Local council in Tabiteuea, Kiribati

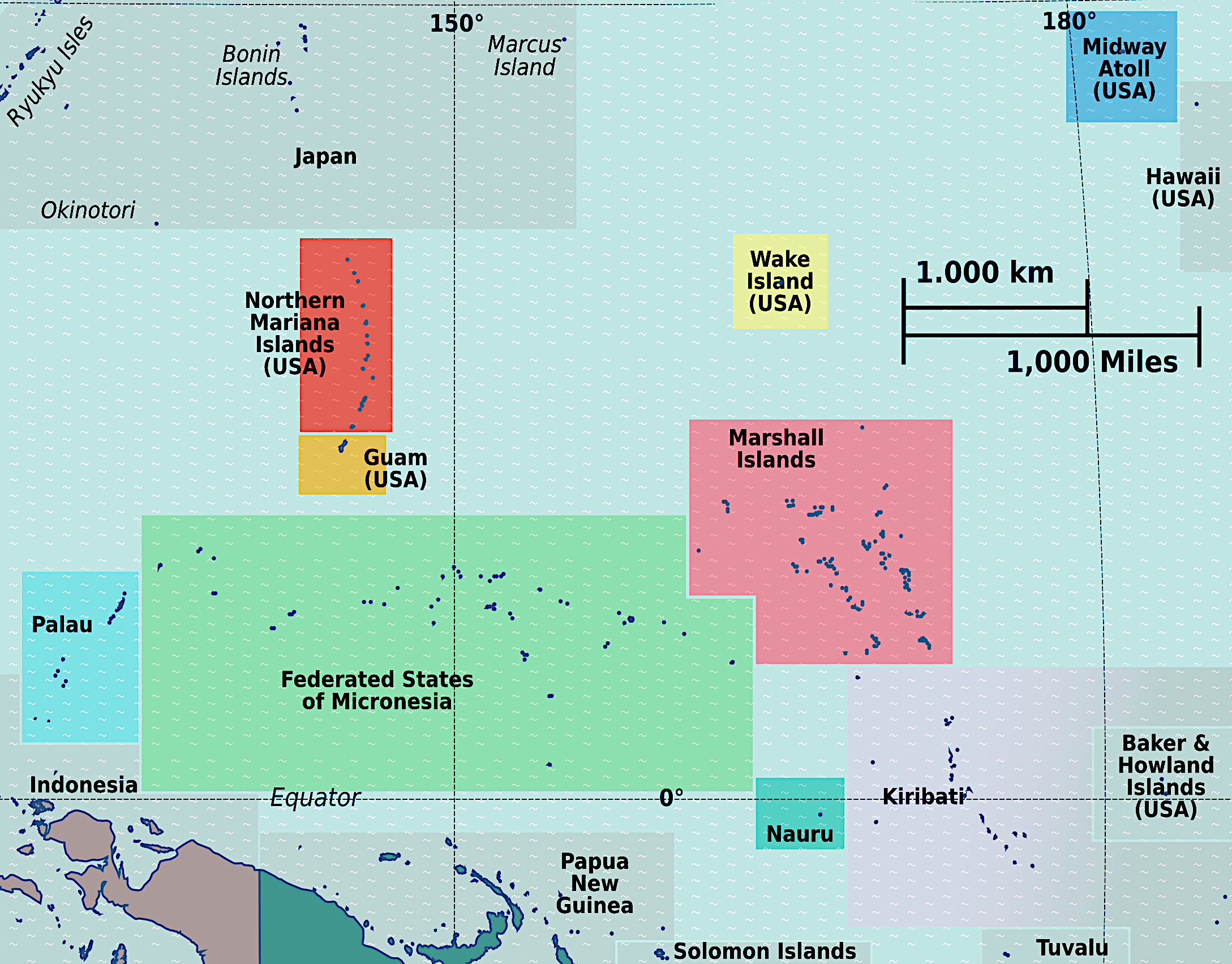
- Location within Kiribati Location within Micronesia Location within Oceania Location within Pacific Ocean

Geography
- Location: Pacific Ocean
- Coordinates: 1°21′S 174°48′E
- Archipelago: Gilbert Islands

Administration
- Kiribati

North Tabiteuea is a local council in Tabiteuea, Kiribati.

North Tabiteuea (in Gilbertese, Tabiteuea Meang) has a land area of 26 km^{2} (10 sq mi) and a population of 4,120 as of 2020, distributed among twelve villages (capital Utiroa).

On 1 July 1799, Charles Bishop and George Bass entered the Tabiteuea lagoon, while many pirogues approached the brig Nautilus. Bishop named it Bishop's Island, and named Aanikai, Drummond's Island.[1]

During the United States Exploring Expedition, April 1841, the American captain William L. Hudson arrived at Tabiteuea, then known as Drummond's Island. Because a crew member who went ashore was missing for no reason, reprisals were decided: at least twenty of the inhabitants were killed by the Americans. Utiroa was set on fire and the maneaba destroyed, during the Battle of Drummond's Island.

The Catholic bishop Octave Terrienne moved the seat of the apostolic vicariate of the Gilbert and Ellice islands to Tanaeang in today's North Tabiteuea, instead of Ocean Island, then the capital of the colony.
