= Paul Mea =

Bishop of Tarawa and Nauru (1939–2021)

His Excellency Paul Mea
- Bishop of Tarawa and Nauru
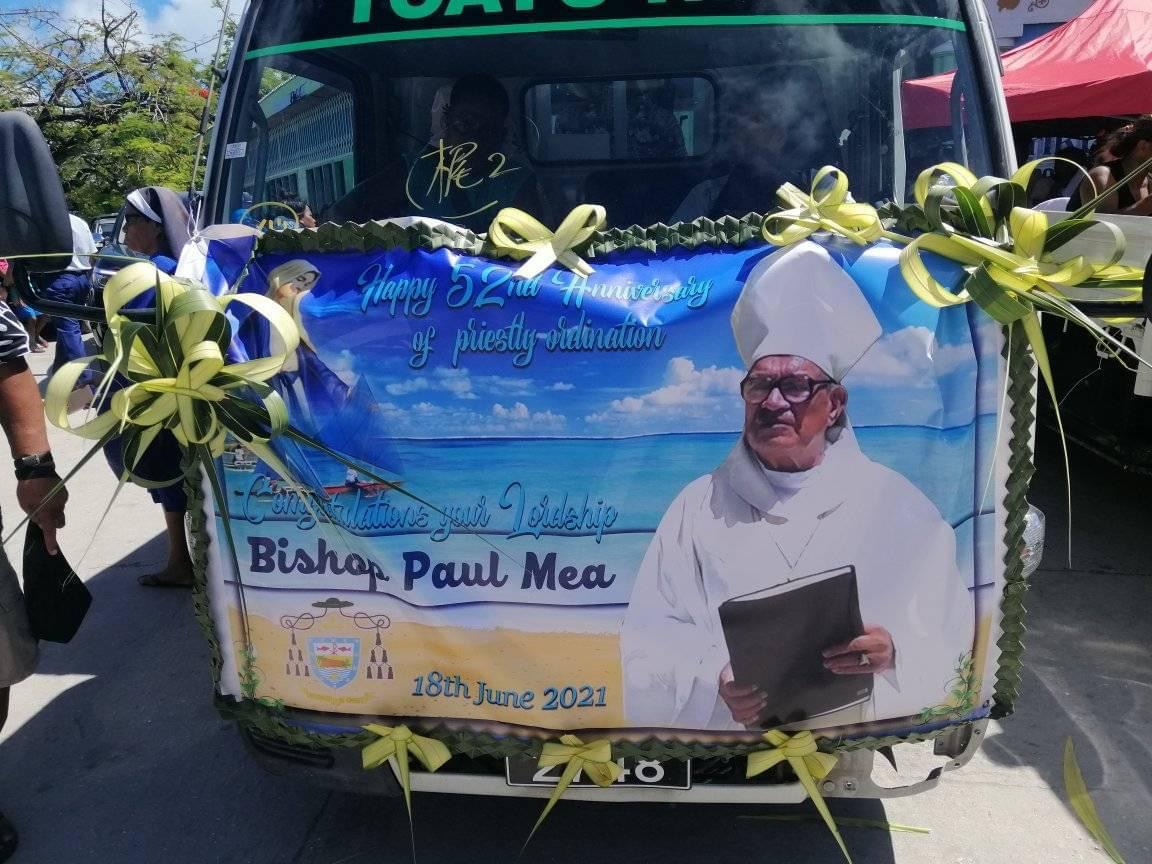
- Church: Roman Catholic Church
- Diocese: Diocese of Tarawa and Nauru
- Installed: 15 November 1978
- Term ended: 29 June 2020
- Predecessor: Pierre Guichet
- Successor: Koru Tito
- Previous post: Vicar General of the Diocese of Tarawa

Orders
- Ordination: 18 January 1969
- Consecration: 10 February 1979 by Pierre Guichet

Personal details
- Born: 16 December 1939 Beru, Kiribati
- Died: 24 June 2021 (aged 81) South Tarawa, Kiribati
- Motto: To serve in the islands

Styles of Paul Mea
- Reference style: The Most Reverend
- Spoken style: Your Excellency
- Religious style: Monsignor

Paul Eusebius Mea Kaiuea (16 December 1939 - 24 June 2021) was a Kiribati Roman Catholic prelate bishop of the Diocese of Tarawa and Nauru from 1978 to 2020.

Mea was born in Gilbert and Ellice Islands and was ordained in 1969 as a priest of the Missionaries of the Sacred Heart. He was then appointed as the parish priest of North Tarawa. His work brought him to the attention of French Bishop Pierre Guichet, and in 1978, Mea succeeded him as the diocese bishop when it encompassed all of Gilbert Islands, soon independent Kiribati, Nauru, and Tuvalu. In 1982, Tuvalu was removed from the jurisdiction of the diocese. In 2020, he became emeritus after his resignation and was replaced by elected Koru Tito.

Paul Mea died on June 24, 2021.
