= Koinawa =

- Village
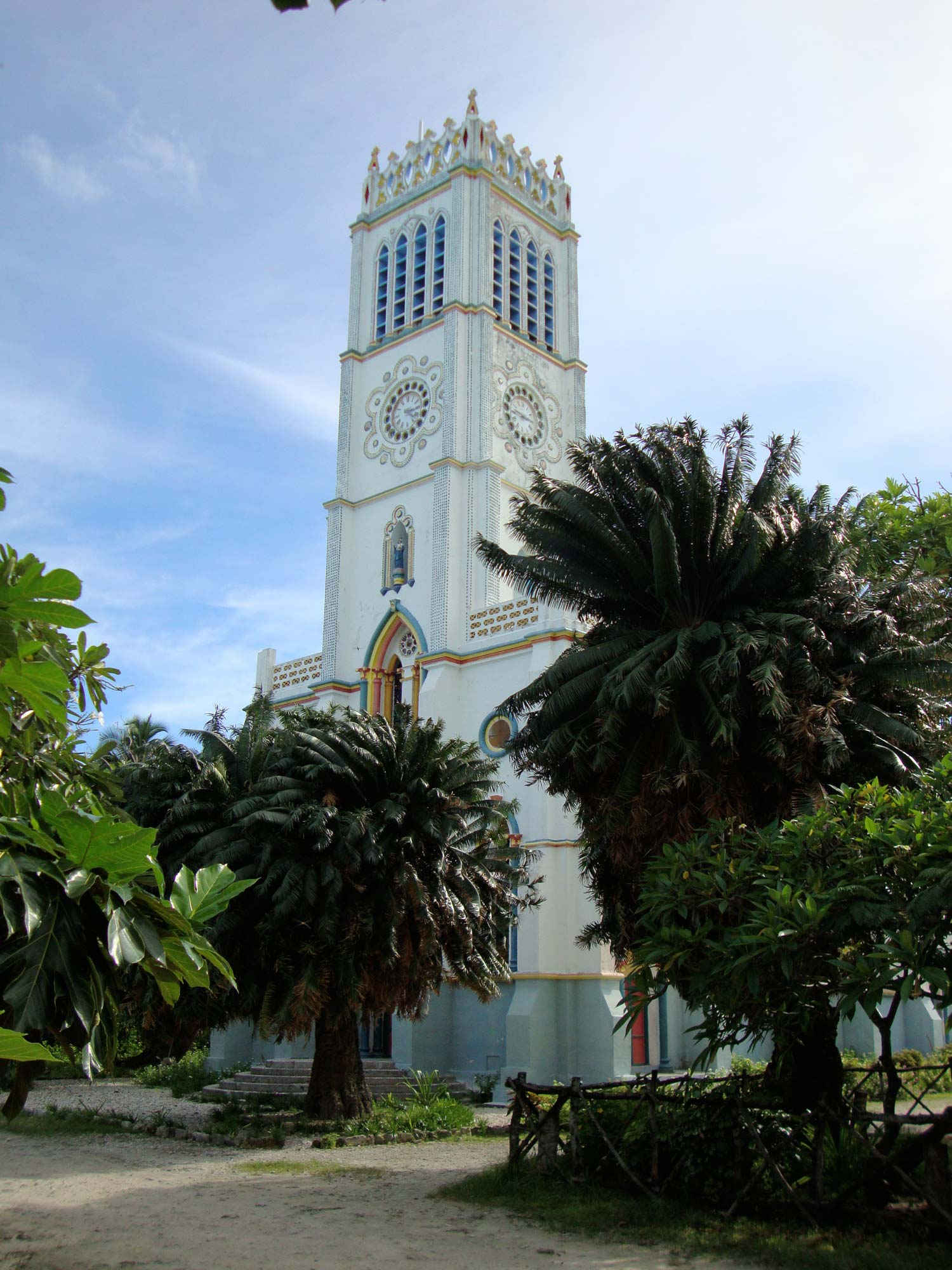
- The catholic Church of Our Lady of the Rosary

- Location within Kiribati
- Coordinates: 1°52′N 172°59′E
- Country: Kiribati

Population (2010)
  - Total: 312

Koinawa is a village on Abaiang atoll in Kiribati. There are 312 residents of the village (2010 census). It is located to the south of Aonobuaka; to its east is Morikao.

The village has a medical clinic that is staffed by a Nursing Officer and the clinic is accessed by resident of the Koinawa and Aonobuaka community.

The lagoon coastline of Koinawa is eroding as the result of wave action.

== Religion ==
=== Church ===
- Our Lady of the Rosary Church, Koinawa
