= Kiribati Protestant Church =

Protestant Christian denomination in Kiribati

The Kiribati Protestant Church (KPC) and earlier, the Gilbert Islands Protestant Church, is a Protestant Christian denomination in Kiribati. With approximately 10,000 members, and 136 congregations, the KPC was the second-largest religious group in Kiribati (after Catholicism) before the creation of the new Kiribati Uniting Church in 2014, and accounts now for approximately 8 percent of the population of the country.

== History ==
Because of their remoteness and the few European presence, the Gilbert and Ellice Islands were ignored by Christian missions until the latter half of the 19th century. Protestant missionaries (e.g., Hiram Bingham) sent by the American Board of Commissioners for Foreign Missions first arrived in the current Kiribati in 1857, and missionaries from the London Missionary Society arrived in 1870. The missions relied heavily upon Pacific islanders as teachers and pastors: the Protestant converts were served mainly by pastors from Hawaii, Samoa and Tuvalu until the early 20th century, after which Ellicean and Gilbertese, trained at Rongorongo, on Beru, took on this role. In 1968, the first general assembly of the Gilbert Islands Protestant Church (GIPC) met to organise an autonomous church. In 1979, when the Gilbert Islands were renamed Kiribati after independence, the church changed its name to the Kiribati Protestant Church. The church was originally established as a Congregationalist denomination.

== 21st century ==
In 2014, after a Church Bi-annual Assembly (Maungatabu), which was held on the island of Arorae, the initial Kiribati Protestant Church changed its name to Kiribati Uniting Church. The word "uniting" should reflect that the church would like to become now a union of several Protestant denominations in Kiribati, including Congregationalists, Evangelicals, Anglicans, and Presbyterians, but this move provoked an immediate scission and the following recreation of the original KPC.

The current head of KPC is Baranite Kirata (PI).
