= Tanaeang =

Coordinates: 1°10′S 174°42′E

Tanaeang is a village in Tabiteuea North, Kiribati.

== History ==
According to oral tradition, Tabiteuea has long been divided between autonomous districts or villages such as Tanaeang, known as aono. One story describes the establishment of Tanaeang from a distant land in the west, Rôrô, led by the brothers Bouabaraki and Taningabaraki. They built the village maneaba, which was completed by another group of ancestors, Bakoa and his three sons, Rairimoa, Rairimui and Tewatu.

In the 1860s, a man named Tanako introduced a new religion to Tabiteuea that worshipped Tioba (Jehovah). It syncretized indigenous beliefs and Christian teachings he claimed to have learned in Fiji. Tanaeang was quickly converted and made Tanako's headquarters. Tioba's worshippers were later defeated in a violent battle against two Protestant missionaries and their convertees. Tanaeang was forced to convert to Protestantism.

In 1933, Father Octave Terrienne and Brother Eloi built a Catholic stone church in Tanaeang. The village today is predominantly Catholic. However, the people prefer to use a larger church modelled after a maneaba, with cement pillars and a corrugated sheet metal roof. In 1936, Terrienne became the bishop of the Gilbert Islands. He made Tanaeang an apostolic vicariate until he moved to Tarawa in the 1850s.

Former president Teburoro Tito was born in Tanaeang on 25 August 1952 or 1953.

== Bibliography ==
- Dumas, Guigone (2014). Tabiteuea, Kiribati. Fondation Culturelle Musée Barbier-Mueller. ISBN 9-782754-10787-7.
