= List of members of the 11th Parliament of Kiribati =

Tobwaan Kiribati Party: 20 seats Pillars of Truth: 13 seats Kiribati Moa: 13 seats Independents: 1 seat

The 11th Parliament of Kiribati was the legislature of Kiribati following the 2015–16 parliamentary election of members of parliament (MPs) to the House of Assembly (Maneaba ni Maungatabu).

== Members ==
Members of the 11th Parliament of Kiribati
Constituency	Political party	Member	Assumed office	Notes
Makin	Tobwaan Kiribati Party	James Toam	2016	
Makin	Pillars of Truth	Pinto Katia	2016	
Butaritari	Tobwaan Kiribati Party	Alexander Teabo	2016	Minister for Environment, Lands and Agriculture Development
Butaritari	Independent	Tinian Reiher	2016	
Marakei	Tobwaan Kiribati Party	Ioteba Tebau	2016	
Marakei	Tobwaan Kiribati Party	Ruateki Tekaiara	2016	Minister of Infrastructure & Sustainable Energy
Abaiang	Tobwaan Kiribati Party	Tekena Toroa	2016	
Abaiang	Tobwaan Kiribati Party	Teuea Toatu	2016	Vice President, Minister for Finance and Economic Development
Abaiang	Pillars of Truth	Kautu Tenaua	2016	
North Tarawa	Tobwaan Kiribati Party	Emil Urii Tuuti	2016	
North Tarawa	Tobwaan Kiribati Party	Atarake Natara	2016	Minister for Internal and Social Affairs
North Tarawa	Pillars of Truth	Boutu Bateriki	2016	
South Tarawa	Tobwaan Kiribati Party	Taoaba Kaiea	2017	Assumed office after the resignation of Teburoro Tito; Minister for Women, Youth, Sports and Social Affairs
South Tarawa	Tobwaan Kiribati Party	Kourabi Nenem	2016	
South Tarawa	Pillars of Truth	Shiu-Fung Jong	2016	
Betio	Tobwaan Kiribati Party	Ioteba Redfern	2016	Minister for Employment and Human Resource
Betio	Tobwaan Kiribati Party	Tebao Awerika	2016	
Betio	Pillars of Truth	Tangariki Reete	2016	
Maiana	Tobwaan Kiribati Party	David Collins	2016	Minister for Education
Maiana	Pillars of Truth	Kaure Babo	2016	
Kuria	Tobwaan Kiribati Party	Banuera Berina	2016	
Aranuka	Tobwaan Kiribati Party	Tianeti Ioane	2016	
Abemama	Tobwaan Kiribati Party	Natan Teewe	2016	Minister of Justice
Abemama	Tobwaan Kiribati Party	Willie Tokataake	2016	Minister of Information, Communication, Transport, Tourism Development
Nonouti	Tobwaan Kiribati Party	Bonteman Tabera	2017	Assumed office after the death of Waysang Kum Kee
Nonouti	Pillars of Truth	Ieremia Tabai	2016	
North	Tobwaan Kiribati Party	Kobebe Taitai	2016	Minister of Internal Affairs
Tabiteuea North	Pillars of Truth	Taberannang Timeon	2016	
Tabiteuea South	Pillars of Truth	Titabu Tabane	2016	
Onotoa	Tobwaan Kiribati Party	Taneti Maamau	2016	President of Kiribati
Onotoa	Tobwaan Kiribati Party	Kouraiti Beniato	2016	
Beru	Tobwaan Kiribati Party	Tetabo Nakara	2016	Minister for Fisheries and Marine Resources Development
Beru	Pillars of Truth	England Iuta	2016	
Nikunau	Tobwaan Kiribati Party	Tauanei Marea	2016	Minister Health and Medical Services
Nikunau	Pillars of Truth	Rimeta Beniamina	2016	
Tamana	Tobwaan Kiribati Party	Tekeeua Tarati	2019	Assumed office after the resignation of Matiota Kairo
Arorae	Pillars of Truth	Teima Onorio	2016	
Kiritimati	Tobwaan Kiribati Party	Mikarite Temari	2016	Minister for Lines and Phoenix Islands Development
Kiritimati	Tobwaan Kiribati Party	Jacob Teem	2016	
Kiritimati	Pillars of Truth	Kirata Temamaka	2016	
Tabuaeran	Tobwaan Kiribati Party	Tekiau Aretaateta	2016	
Tabuaeran	Tobwaan Kiribati Party	Tewaaki Kobae	2016	
Teraina	Tobwaan Kiribati Party	Uriam Iabeta	2016	
Banaba	Tobwaan Kiribati Party	Tibanga Taratai	2016	
Rabi Island	Tobwaan Kiribati Party	David Christopher	2016	Nominated member

=== Former members ===
Former members of the 11th Parliament of Kiribati
Constituency	Political party	Member	Assumed office	Notes
South Tarawa	Tobwaan Kiribati Party	Teburoro Tito	2016	Resigned in 2017 to become Kiribati's Permanent Representative to the United Nations.
Nonouti	Tobwaan Kiribati Party	Waysang Kum Kee	2016	Died of cancer in late 2016.
Tamana	Pillars of Truth	Matiota Kairo	2016	Resigned in 2018.
