= Politics of Kiribati =

Politics of Kiribati takes place in a framework of a parliamentary representative democratic republic, whereby the Beretitenti, President of Kiribati, is both the head of state and head of government, and of a multi-party system. Executive power is exercised by the government, Beretitenti, and his cabinet, all MPs. Legislative power is exercised by the House of Assembly. The Judiciary of Kiribati is independent of the executive and the legislature. The Constitution of Kiribati, promulgated at independence on 12 July 1979, establishes the Republic of Kiribati as a sovereign democratic republic and guarantees the fundamental rights of its citizens and residents.

== Executive branch ==
After each general election, the new-elected Maneaba ni Maungatabu (House of Assembly) nominates not less than three nor more than four of its own members to stand as candidates for President (Beretitenti). The voting public then elects the Beretitenti from among these candidates. On 22 June 2020, for the first election ever since 1979 Independence, two candidates only have been nominated — unless Section 32(2) of the Constitution writes “not less than 3”. On 17 June 2020, Judgment of Sir John Muria, the Chief Justice on Civil Case 56, allowed this reading of the Constitution. The elected Beretitenti appoints a Kauoman-ni-Beretitenti (vice-president) and up to ten other Cabinet Ministers from among the members of the Maneaba.

Main office holders
Office	Name	Party	Since
President	Taneti Maamau	Tobwaan Kiribati Party	11 March 2016
Vice President	Teuea Toatu	Tobwaan Kiribati Party	19 June 2019

=== Cabinet ===
The Cabinet is the top decision-making body in Kiribati, through which all functions of the government get their authority. Parliament can undo Cabinet decisions through a vote of no confidence, triggering a new election.

The current Cabinet consists of the following Ministers:

Cabinet of Kiribati (since 2 July 2020)
Office	Officeholder
Beretitenti and Minister of Foreign Affairs and Immigration	Taneti Maamau
Vice President and Minister of Finance and Economic Development	Dr Teuea Toatu
Minister of Infrastructure and Sustainable Energy (MISE)	Willie Tokataake
Minister of Education	Alexander Teabo
Minister of Environment, Lands and Agricultural Development (MELAD)	Ruateki Tekaiara
Minister of Fisheries and Marine Resources Development	Ribanataake Tiwau
Minister of Health and Medical Services	Dr Tinte Itinteang
Minister of Internal Affairs (MIA)	Boutu Bateriki
Minister of Commerce, Industry and Cooperatives (MCIC)	Booti Nauan
Minister for Women, Youth, Sports and Social Affairs (MWYSSA)	Martin Moreti
Minister of Employment and Human Resources (MEHR)	Taabeta Teakai
Minister for Line and Phoenix Islands Development	Mikarite Temari (sworn in on 6 August 2020)
Minister of Justice (MOJ)	Tarakabu Tofinga (sworn in on 16 July 2020)
Minister of Information, Communications, Transport and Tourism Development (MICTTD)	Tekeeua Tarati

The first nine ministers sworn in on 2 July 2020 at the State House in Bairiki (South Tarawa) and include Dr Teuea Toatu, Willie Tokataake, Ruateki Tekaiara, Ribanataake Awira, Dr Tinte Itinteang, Boutu Bateriki, Booti Nauan, Martin Moreti and Taabeta Teakaiao.

The remaining four ministers who are stranded in the outer islands, at their respective island, which include Alexander Teabo, Tarakabu Martin, Tekeeua Tarati and Mikarite Temari, have been sworn later.

=== Attorneys-General of Kiribati ===
In Kiribati, the Attorney-General is defined by section 42 of the Constitution as "the principal legal adviser to the Government." The Constitution specifies: "No person shall be qualified to hold or to act in the office of Attorney-General unless he is qualified to practise in Kiribati as an advocate in the High Court."

The Attorney-General of Kiribati was also until October 2016 a member of Cabinet of Kiribati and a member of the Maneaba ni Maungatabu as an ex-officio member of parliament. According to a 2005 source, the Attorney-General "is designated by the Republic of Kiribati as the Central Authority who shall have the responsibility and power to receive requests for mutual legal assistance."

Attorneys-General of Kiribati (Complete Table)
Name	Years of Service
C.J. (Joe) Lynch	c. 1978-1979
Michael Jennings	c. 1980-1984
Michael N. Takabwebwe	c. 1984-2002
Titabu Tabane	c. 2002-2016
Natan Teewe Brechtefeld	2016
Tetiro Semilota (1st I-Kiribati female)	October 2016-October 2022

== Legislative branch ==
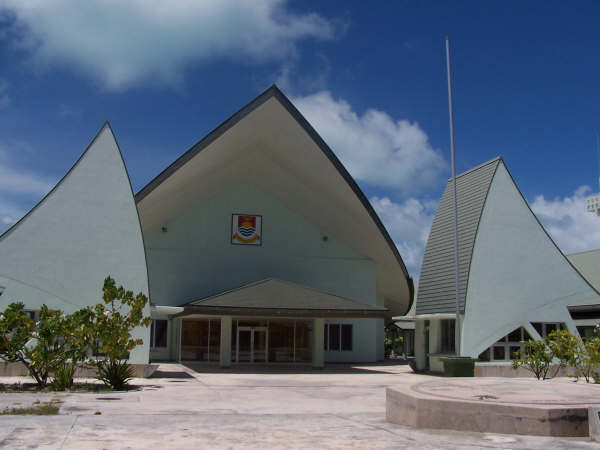
Maneaba ni Maungatabu, in Ambo (2000)

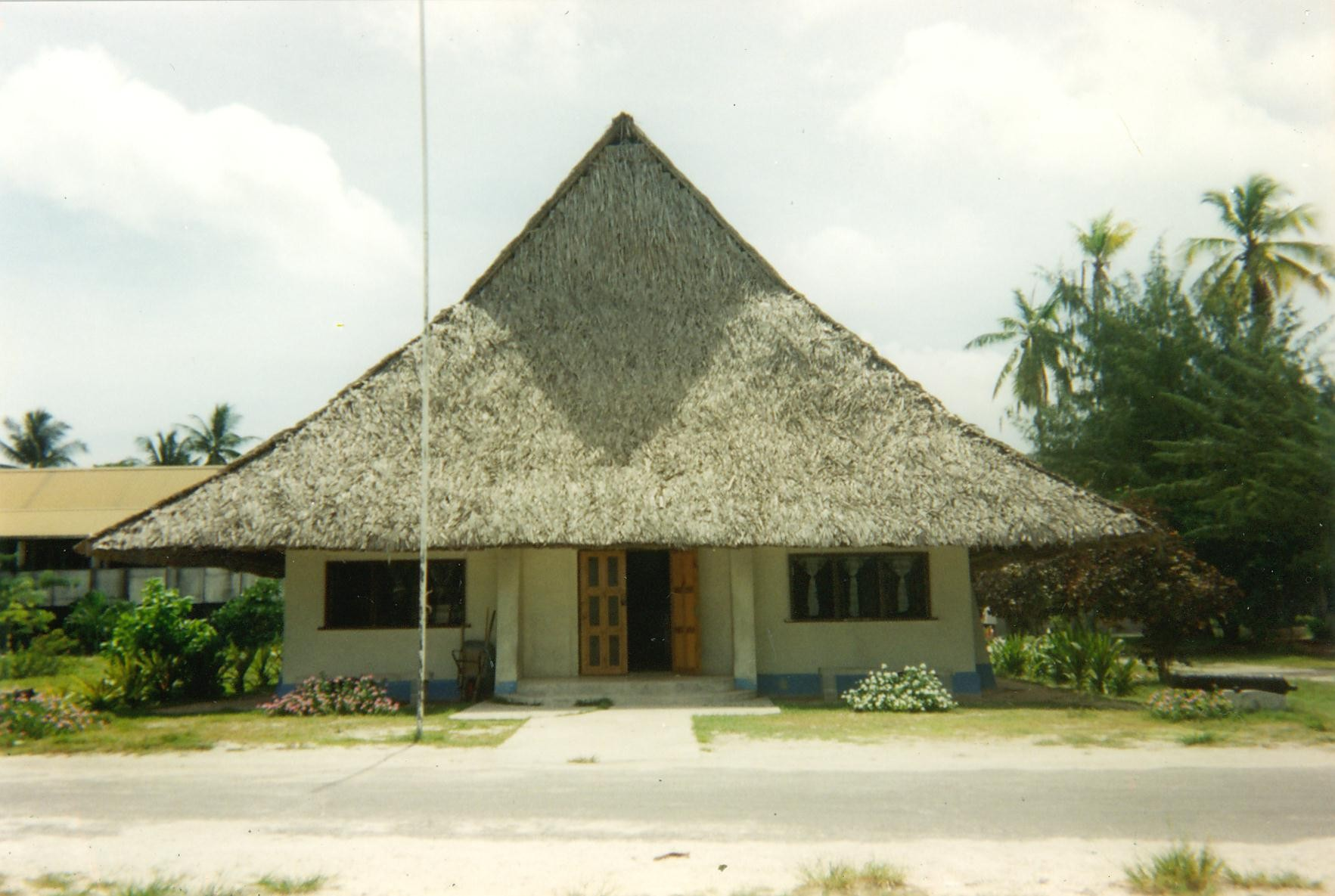
The former House of Assembly, at Bairiki

In a Westminster system, the unicameral House of Assembly (Maneaba ni Maungatabu) has 45 members: 44 elected in single-seat and multi-seat constituencies; one appointed member from the Banaban community on Rabi Island in Fiji. The Attorney general was no longer an ex officio member. The elected members of the Maneaba ni Maungatabu serve four-year terms. The Speaker of the Maneaba ni Maungatabu is elected by the members of the Maneaba from outside of its membership. The total number of MPs is forty-four from Kiribati, and the representative nominated from the Rabi Council representing the people on Rabi Island in Fiji.

All citizens of Kiribati are eligible to vote at the age of 18.

== Judiciary ==
The Chapter VI of the Constitution of 1979 describes the Judiciary of Kiribati. The judicial system consists of magistrates' courts, the High Court and the Kiribati Court of Appeal. The Beretitenti (President), acting in accordance with the advice of the Public Service Commission, makes all judicial appointments, and amongst them, the Chief Justice, the main judge of the High Court. The High Court is in Betio. Sir John Muria was the Chief Justice of Kiribati until his replacement by Bill Hastings in August 2021, after a 8 months vacancy. On 30 June 2022, Hastings was abruptly suspended from his office during the 2022 Kiribati constitutional crisis.

The Judicial Committee of the Privy Council in London, England has jurisdiction only if a case involves constitutional rights. Appeals are taken directly to the Judicial Committee of the Privy Council itself.

The Court of Appeal of Kiribati is otherwise the supreme court in Kiribati.

=== The People's Lawyer of Kiribati ===
The People's Lawyer of Kiribati represents disadvantaged residents and those who are unable to access legal representation. Accordingly, the office represents clients in "Land, Civil and Criminal Matters and act for them in the Magistrates and High Court as well as the Court of Appeal." The position had long been filled by expatriate lawyers who were volunteering from either Australia or New Zealand with the "role...funded by the Australian Government through [the] Australian Volunteers International." In 2015, the role of The People's Lawyer changed in that it was now filled by a Kiribati citizen: Raweita Beniata (male lawyer; 2015- ).

The People's Lawyer of Kiribati (Incomplete Table)
Name	Term
Roger Bell (who established the office)	c. 1980-1982
Michael Lodge	c. -1986
David Lambourne	c. 1995-1999
Jackie Huston	c. 2003-2004
Jennifer Troup	c. 2004-2006
Joelle Grover	c. 2006-2007
Aomoro Amten	c. 2007-2008
Daniel Webb	c. 2010-2011
Debrah Mercurio	c. 2011-2012
Nancy Walker Andrea Hadaway	c. 2012-2013
Jessica McLaren	c. 2013-2015
Raweita Beniata (1st I-Kiribati male citizen)	c. 2015-

== Political conditions ==
Political parties have existed since 1965 but are more similar to informal coalitions in behaviour. They do not have official platforms or party structures. Most candidates formally present themselves as independents, then they joined one party at the first meeting of the House. The website of the House of Assembly explains that in this way:

"There [were] four political parties in Kiribati, Boutokaan Te Koaua (BTK), Maurin Kiribati Party (MKP), Maneaban Te Mauri Party (MMP) and Kiribati Tabomoa Party. The parties are loose groupings rather than disciplined blocks, with little or no structure. Members may change allegiance on a number of occasions during their tenure. It is also common for members to vote according to the special interests of their electorate on certain issues."

Kiribati Tabomoa Party ("National Progressive Party") and Christian Democratic Party merged into Maneaban Te Mauri (MMP, "Protect the Maneaba") in 2003, which later merged with Kiribati Independent Party into Karikirakean Te I-Kiribati (KTK, "United Coalition Party") in 2010, which later merged with Maurin Kiribati Party (MKP) to form Tobwaan Kiribati Party (TKP), the only one facing Boutokaan Te Koaua (BTK, "Pillars of Truth").

A major source of conflict has been the protracted bid by the residents of Banaba Island to secede and have their island placed under the protection of Fiji. The government's attempts to placate the Banabans include several special provisions in the constitution, such as the designation of a Banaban seat in the legislature and the return of land previously acquired by the government for phosphate mining.

== Political parties and elections ==
There is no solid tradition of formally organized political parties in Kiribati, even if the 2 first political parties were founded in 1965; they more closely resemble factions or interest groups with no formal platforms:

- BKM = Boutokaan Kiribati Moa Party, former BTK = Boutokaan te Koaua (Pillars of Truth, split from NPP), merged with KM, in May 2020;
- TKP = Tobwaan Kiribati Party (Embracing Kiribati Party, BTK opposition, merger of KTK and Maurin Kiribati, est. 19 Jan 2016);
- Former parties:
  - CDP = Maneabau te Mauri (Christian Democratic Party, 1965–1994, merged into MTM);
  - GNP = Gilbertese National Party (supported Gilbert Islands’ separation from Ellice Islands, est. 16 Oct 1965);
  - KM = Kiribati Moa (Kiribati First, split from TKP, est. Nov 2019) then merged with BTK in May 2020;
  - KTK = Karikirakean Tei I-Kiribati (United Coalition Party, 2010–2016, merged into TKP);
  - MTM = Maneaban te Mauri (Protect the Maneaba, Christian-democratic, conservative, merger of CDP and NPP, 2010 merged into KTK);
  - NPP = National Progressive Party (merged into MTM)

=== 2020 presidential election ===
Candidate	Party	Votes	%
Taneti Maamau	Tobwaan Kiribati Party	26,053	59.32
Banuera Berina	Boutokaan Kiribati Moa Party	17,866	40.68
Total		43,919	100.00
Valid votes		43,919	99.75
Invalid/blank votes		112	0.25
Total votes		44,031	100.00
Registered voters/turnout		55,268	79.67
Source: Ministry of Justice

=== 2016 presidential election ===
Candidate	Party	Votes	%
Taneti Maamau	Tobwaan Kiribati Party	19,833	59.96
Rimeta Beniamina	Pillars of Truth	12,764	38.59
Tianeti Ioane	Pillars of Truth	482	1.46
Invalid/blank votes		168	–
Total		33,247	100
Registered voters/turnout			
Source: Pina

=== 2015-16 legislative election ===
Party	First round			Second round			Total seats	+/–
Party	Votes	%	Seats	Votes	%	Seats	Total seats	+/–
Pillars of Truth							26	+11
United Coalition Party							19	
Maurin Kiribati Party							19	
Elected Speaker	–	–	–	–	–	–	1	0
Invalid/blank votes		–	–		–	–	–	–
Total			19			25	46	0
Registered voters/turnout			–			–	–	–
Source: IPU

== See also ==
- 2022 Kiribati constitutional crisis
