= Cabinet of Kiribati =

The Cabinet of Kiribati is the cabinet (executive branch) of the government of the Republic of Kiribati.

The initial text of the Constitution of Kiribati (art.40) specifies that the Cabinet "shall consist of the Beretitenti, the Kauoman-ni-Beretitenti and not more than 10 other Ministers, and the Attorney-General". Members of the Cabinet are appointed by the President, from among Members of Parliament (art.41). Since October 2016, a change of the Constitution text allows more than 10 ministries and retires the Attorney General from the Cabinet.

All ministries but one are headquartered in South Tarawa, from Betio to Bikenibeu. The Ministry of Line and Phoenix Islands Development is situated in London, Kiribati on Kiritimati.

== Current Cabinet ==
The current Cabinet consists of the following Ministers:

Cabinet of Kiribati (since 2 July 2020)
| Office | Officeholder |
|---|---|
| Beretitenti and Minister of Foreign Affairs and Immigration | Taneti Maamau |
| Vice President and Minister of Finance and Economic Development | Dr Teuea Toatu |
| Minister of Infrastructure and Sustainable Energy (MISE) | Willie Tokataake |
| Minister of Education | Alexander Teabo (sworn in on 10 July 2020) |
| Minister of Environment, Lands and Agricultural Development (MELAD) | Ruateki Tekaiara |
| Minister of Fisheries and Marine Resources Development | Ribanataake Tiwau |
| Minister of Health and Medical Services | Dr Tinte Itinteang |
| Minister of Internal Affairs (MIA) | Boutu Bateriki |
| Minister of Commerce, Industry and Cooperatives (MCIC) | Booti Nauan |
| Minister for Women, Youth, Sports and Social Affairs (MWYSSA) | Martin Moreti |
| Minister of Employment and Human Resources (MEHR) | Mrs Taabeta Teakai |
| Minister for Line and Phoenix Islands Development | Mikarite Temari (sworn in on 6 August 2020) |
| Minister of Justice (MOJ) | Tarakabu Tofinga (sworn in on 16 July 2020) |
| Minister of Information, Communications, Transport and Tourism Development (MICTTD) | Tekeeua Tarati (sworn in on 11 July 2020) |

The first nine ministers sworn in on 2 July 2020 at the State House in Bairiki (South Tarawa) and include Dr Teuea Toatu, Willie Tokataake, Ruateki Tekaiara, Ribanataake Awira, Dr Tinte Itinteang, Boutu Bateriki, Booti Nauan, Martin Moreti and Taabeta Teakaiao.

The remaining four ministers who was stranded in the outer islands, at their respective island, which include Alexander Teabo, Tarakabu Tofinga, Tekeeua Tarati and Mikarite Temari, will be sworn later.

== Previous cabinets ==
From March 2016 to April 2020, President of Kiribati is Taneti Maamau. His first cabinet includes Alexander Teabo and other politicians.

| Portfolio | Minister |
|---|---|
| Beretitenti (President); Office of Beretitenti; Minister for Foreign Affairs and Immigration; Minister for the Public Service Office, MET, Housing, and the Kiribati Police Service | His Excellency Taneti Maamau |
| Kauoman ni Beretitenti (Vice President); Minister for Finance and Economic Development | Honourable Dr Teuea Toatu (from June 2019) |
| Minister for Internal Affairs, then Commerce, Industry and Cooperatives | Honourable Mr Atarake Nataara |
| Minister for Information, Communications, Transport and Tourism Development | Honourable Mr Willie Tokataake |
| Minister for Women, Youth and Social Affairs, then Education | Honourable Mr David Collins, then Kourabi Nenem (2018), then from June 2019, Taoaba Kaiea |
| Minister for Environment, Lands and Agricultural Development | Tebao Awerika, then Honourable Mr Alexander Teabo |
| Minister for Public Works and Utilities, then Women, Youth and Sports | Honourable Mr Kourabi Nenem (until June 2019) |
| Minister for Fisheries and Marine Resources Development | Honourable Mr Tetabo Nakara |
| Minister of Health and Medical Services | Honourable Mr Kobebe Taitai, then Tauanei Marea |
| Minister for Internal Affairs | Honourable Mr Kobebe Taitai (from 2018) |
| Minister of Justice (newly created Ministry by Maamau's administration) | Honourable Mr Natan Teewe (from October 2016, before Attorney-General), then from November 2019, James Taom |
| Minister for Employment and Human Resource | Honourable Mr Ioteba Redfern (from October 2016) |
| Minister for Line and Phoenix Islands Development | Honourable Mr Mikarite Temari |
| Minister for Infrastructure and Sustainable Energy | Honourable Mr Ruateki Tekaiara |

=== 3rd Tong Cabinet 2011-2016 ===
Following his re-election as president in January 2012, Anote Tong appointed the following Cabinet. Several of his previous ministers having lost their seat in the October 2011 parliamentary elections, he sought and obtained the support of newly elected MPs, notably from the Opposition Maurin Kiribati party.

Maurin Kiribati members who joined the government also joined the BTK party. Party keys below indicate each minister's initial affiliation following the 2012 election.

| Party key | Boutokaan Te Koaua |
| Party key | Maurin Kiribati Party |

| Portfolio | Minister |
|---|---|
| Beretitenti (President); Minister for Foreign Affairs and Immigration; also Minister responsible for the Public Service Office and the Kiribati Police Service | His Excellency Anote Tong |
| Kauoman ni Beretitenti (Vice President); Minister for Internal and Social Affairs | Honourable Ms Teima Onorio |
| Minister for Commerce, Industry and Cooperatives | Honourable Mr Pinto Katia |
| Minister for Communications, Transport and Tourism Development | Honourable Mr Taberannang Timeon |
| Minister for Education | Honourable Ms Maere Tekanene |
| Minister for Environment, Land and Agricultural Development | Honourable Mr Tiarite Kwong |
| Minister for Finance and Economic Development | Honourable Mr Tom Murdoch |
| Minister for Fisheries and Marine Resource Development | Honourable Mr Tinian Reiher |
| Minister for Health and Medical Services | Honourable Dr Kautu Tenaua |
| Minister for Labour and Human Resources Development | Honourable Mr Boutu Bateriki |
| Minister for Line and Phoenix Islands Development | Honourable Mr Tawita Temoku |
| Minister for Public Works and Utilities | Honourable Mr Kirabuke Teiaua |
| Attorney-General | Honourable Mr Titabu Tabane |

In October 2013, two ministers -Communications, transport and tourism Minister Taberannang Timeon and Public works and energy Minister Kirabuke Teiaua- resigned, after revelations that they had received excessive allowance payments, and amidst calls that they be sacked for misconduct. They were replaced by Rimeta Beniamina and Waysang Kum Kee. Additionally, Tangariki Reete was appointed to the newly created position of Minister for Women, Youth and Social Affairs.

In February 2014, Boutu Bateriki, the Minister for Labour (Maurin Kiribati), resigned after being charged with assaulting his former wife. He was replaced by Martin Moreti.

=== 2nd Tong Cabinet 2007-2011 ===
As of June 2011:

| Portfolio | Minister |
|---|---|
| President; Minister for Foreign Affairs and Immigration | Anote Tong |
| Vice President; Minister for Commerce, Industry and Cooperatives | Teima Onorio (Arorae) |
| Minister for Public Works and Utilities / Public Works and Infrastructure | Kouraiti Beniato (Onotoa) then Kirabuke Teiaua (Beru) |
| Minister for Education, Youth and Sports | James Taom (Makin), then Toakai Koririntetaake (Butaritari) |
| Minister for Communications, Transport and Tourism Development | Patrick Tatireta then Temate Ereateiti (Marakei) |
| Minister for Health and Medical Services | Dr. Kautu Tenaua (Abaiang) |
| Minister for the Environment, Land and Agricultural Development | Tetabo Nakara (Beru) then Amberoti Nikora (Aranuka) |
| Minister for the Interior and Social Affairs | Amberoti Nikora (Aranuka), then Kouraiti Beniato (Onotoa) |
| Minister for Finance and Economic Development | Natan Teewe (Abemama) |
| Minister for Fisheries and Marine Resources | Taberannang Timeon (Tabiteuea-Meang) |
| Minister for the Line and Phoenix Islands | Tawita Temoku (Kiritimati) |
| Minister for Labour and Human Resources | Ioteba Redfern (Betio) |
| Attorney-General | Titabu Tabane |

=== 1st Tong cabinet ===
2003–2007.

- Anote Tong, also MFA
- Teima Onorio, also Minister for Education, Youth and Sport Development
- Titabu Tabane, Attorney general
- Ioteba Redfern, Minister for CIC
- Natan Teewe, Minister for CTTD
- Martin Tofinga, Minister for ELAD
- Nabuti Mwemwenikarawa, Minister for FED
- Natanaera Kirata, Minister for HMS
- Amberoti Nikora, Minister for IA & SD
- Bauro Tongaai, Minister for Labour
- Tawita Temoku, Minister for the Line and Phoenix Islands Development
- Tetabo Nakara, Minister for Fisheries NRD
- James Taom, Minister for PWU

== 2nd Tito cabinet ==
In March 2002.

- Hon. Teburoro Tito, Beretitenti, Minister for Foreign Affairs and International Trade
- Hon. Tewareka Tentoa, vice-president (deceased 2000), Minister for Home Affairs and Rural Development, then Beniamina Tinga
- Hon. Willie Tokataake, Minister for Education, Science and Technology
- Hon. Beniamina Tinga, Minister for Finance and Economic Planning
- Hon. Anote Tong, Minister for Environment and Natural Development, resigned within a year
- Hon. Kataotika Teeke, Minister for Health, Family Planning and Social Welfare
- Hon. Manraoi Kaiea (Marakei), Minister for Communications and Tourism
- Hon. Tanieru Awerika, Commerce, Industry and Employment
- Hon. Emile Schutz, Works and Energy
- Hon. Teiraoi Tetabea, Line and Phoenix Islands Development

=== 1st Tito cabinet ===
Cabinet Ministers 1994-1998:

- Tewareka Tentoa, VP and HA & RD
- Hon. Kataotika Tekee (North Tarawa), Health, Family Planning and SW
- Hon. Manraoi Kaiea (Marakei), Transport C Tourism
- Hon. Emile Schutz (Abaiang), Works & Energy
- Hon. Tanieru Awerika (Arorae), CI Employment
- Hon. Beniamina Tinga (Nikunau), Finance & Economic Planning
- Hon. Anote Tong (Maiana), Environment & Natural Rural Development
- Hon. Willie Tokataake (Abemama), Education, Science and Technology
- Hon. Teiraoi Tetabea (Betio), Line and Phoenix Islands Development
- Hon. Tiim Taekiti (Butaritari)
- Hon. Timbo Keariki (Kiritimati)
- Hon. Tewareka Boorau (Beru)
- Hon. Michael N. Takabwebwe, Attorney General, ex-officio.

=== Teannaki cabinet ===
Cabinet announced on 8 June 1991 - 1994.

- Hon. Teatao Teannaki, Beretitenti (from Abaiang) was sworn in on 3 June 1991. National Progressive Party,
- Hon. Taomati Iuta (Beru), vice-president and Minister for Finance and Economic Planning.
- Hon. Boanareke Boanareke (Tamana), Inatoa Tebania (Onotoa), Tiwau Awira (Nikunau) from January 1991, Teaiwa Tenieu (Tabiteuea North), all members of the Kiribati Protestant Church from the southern islands constituencies,
- The central islands are represented by members from Anterea Kirata Kaitaake (Abemama) and Remuera Tateraka (Maiana), both Roman Catholics,
- The northern islands by Tamwi Naotarai (Betio), Baitika Toum (North Tarawa), and Binata Tetaeka (Makin), as well as the Beretitenti himself. All these Ministers were Catholics, but the member for North Tarawa (Mormon).
- Hon. Ieremia Tabai, GCMG (Nonouti), resigned 15 January 1991, replaced by Tiwau Awira
- Hon. Michael N. Takabwebwe, Attorney General, ex-officio.

== 3rd Tabai cabinet ==
1987–1991.

- Hon. Ieremia Tabai, Beretitenti and Minister for Foreign Affairs
- Hon. Teatao Teannaki, vice-president and Minister of Finance and Economic Development
- Hon. Babera Kirata (Onotoa) for Home and Decentralisation
- Hon. Raion Bataroma (Arorae) for Trade, Industry and Labour, resigned 1990
- Hon. Ataraoti Bwebwenibure (Marakei) for Education
- Hon. Baitika Toum (North Tarawa) for World and Energy
- Hon. Boanareke Boanareke (Tamana)
- Hon. Rotaria Ataia (Maiana) for Health and Family Planning
- Hon. Taomati Iuta (Beru) for Natural Resource Development
- Hon. Tiwau Awira (Nikunau)
- Hon. Uera Rabaua (Butaritari) for Communications
- Hon. Ieruru Karotu (Aranuka) (deceased 15 February 1990), then Tekinaiti Kateie, (Abemama) for the Line and Phoenix Group of Islands.
- Hon. Michael N. Takabwebwe, Attorney General.

=== 3rd Tabai cabinet ===
Cabinet Ministers 1984- 1987

- Hon. Babera Kirata, OBE (Onotoa)
- Hon. Baitika Toum (North Tarawa)
- Hon. Binata Tetaeka (Makin)
- Hon. Boanareke Boanareke (Tamana)
- Hon. Taomati Iuta (Beru)
- Hon. Teewe Arobati (Abemama)
- Hon. Tiwau Awira (Nikunau)
- Hon. Uera Rabaua (Butaritari)
- Hon. Michael N. Takabwebwe, Attorney General, ex-officio.

=== 2nd Tabai cabinet ===
1982. Cabinet Ministers 1982 - 1984

- Hon. Ataraoti Bwebwenibure (Marakei)
- Hon. Babera Kirata (Onotoa)
- Hon. Baitika Toum (North Tarawa)
- Hon. Boanareke Boanareke (Tamana)
- Hon. Ieremia Tata (Butaritari)
- Hon. Taomati Iuta (Beru)
- Hon. Tewee Arobati (Abemama)
- Hon. Tiwau Awira (Nikunau)
- Hon. R L. Davel, Attorney general, Ex-officio

=== 1st Tabai cabinet ===
1979–1982. The following government was announced on 20 July 1979:

- Ieremia Tabai, President
- Teatao Teannaki, vice-president and Minister for Home Affairs
- Hon. Abete Merang (South Tarawa), for Health and Community Affairs
- Hon. Babera Kirata (Onotoa), for Works and Communications
- Hon. Taomati Iuta (Beru), for Trade, Industry and Labour
- Hon. Ieremia Tata (Butaritari) for Education, Training and Culture
- Hon. Roniti Teiwaki (Betio) for Natural Resource Development
- Hon. Teewe Arobati (Abemama) for Line and Phoenix Group
- Hon. Tiwau Awira (Nikunau) for Finance
- CJ (Joe) Lynch, then Michael Jennings, Attorney General, ex-officio
