= 2011 Kiribati parliamentary election =

← 2007	21 October 2011 (first round); 28 October 2011 (second round)	2015–16 →
Party	Leader	Seats	+/–
PTK		15	−3
KTK		10	New
MKP		3	New
Independents	–	16	−3
This lists parties that won seats. See the complete results below.

Parliamentary elections were held in Kiribati on 21 and 28 October 2011. In the first round, exactly half of the 44 members of parliament were elected, with the remainder chosen in the proceeding run-off elections. 30 candidates were reelected, and four government ministers lost their seats. One seat had to go to a third round of elections due to two candidates tying in the second round. In the third round, Jacob Teem defended his seat against Rutio Bangao with just 27 votes difference.

== Electoral system ==
Kiribati is an electoral democracy. Electoral laws were last updated in Kiribati in 2007. Everybody over the age of 18 is eligible to vote in Kiribati elections. There are 23 single and multi-member districts across the country, creating a total of 44 seats. Candidates are elected in rounds using a direct majoritarian system. In the first round, a candidate is said to have won the seat if they receive over 50% of the valid votes cast. If no candidate receives 50% of the valid votes cast, a run-off election is held within a week of the original. In a run-off election, only the top candidates from the first election will appear on the ballot. In a multi-member district with three seats vacant, the top five candidates from the first election will advance to the run-off. In a district with two vacant seats, the top four candidates will advance to the run-off.

The same rule applies for a three-seat constituency in which one candidate has already succeeded in winning 50% of the valid votes cast in the first election and been declared elected. In single-seat districts, the top three candidates move forward to the run-off. In addition to the 44 elected members of the Kiribati Parliament, there is one ex-officio member appointed from Banaba Island, and another ex-officio member serving as the Attorney General. All members serve 4-year terms. The member from Banaba Island is appointed by the Rabi Island Council. Though Rabi Island is part of Fiji, many of its residents were originally from Kiribati's Banaba Island. While under British control, many Banaba Island residents were forced to move to Rabi Island as mining for phosphates made the island uninhabitable.

=== Women in politics ===
There is no gender quota; however, there is an effort to get more women to run for office. Given that Pacific Island nations have the lowest rate of women in parliament in the world, the United Nations Pacific Islands Forum Secretariat and the UNDP Pacific Center ran a mock parliament for women in 2011 to build the capacity of female candidates. In advance of the Kiribati elections, a Mock Parliament for Women was run in August 2011. Thirty women participated, including 17 from the outer islands and 13 from Tarawa. The national elections held in October resulted in the re-election of 3 incumbent women, and the election of a new parliamentarian, Mrs. Maere Tekanene from South Tarawa, ultimately becoming Kiribati's Minister of Education Additionally, Teima Onorio was elected to become the Vice President of Kiribati. The 2011 Kiribati election marked a milestone for women in politics in the South Pacific, with many saying that the mock parliament was instrumental in giving them the courage and experience needed to run for public office.

== Campaign ==
There are four parties in Kiribati: Pillars of Truth, United Coalition Party, Karikirakean Tei-Kiribati, and Maurin Kiribati Party. Out of the island's approximately 104,000 residents, 40,000 are registered to vote. The Pillars of Truth Party was the first party to form and rule after Kiribati's independence in 1979, and thus enjoys the most name recognition and the most votes of any party. The United Coalition Party formed from a group of independents and has become the main opposition to the Pillars of Truth. Though political parties exist, they tend to be loosely organized and lack fixed ideologies or formal platforms. Geography, tribal ties, personal loyalties, and relative climate change impact have a larger say in political ideology than any one party.

On the first election day on 21 October 22 candidates secured the required 50% of valid votes to be elected in the first round. Candidates elected in the first round included the caretaker President Tong, former President Tito, and outgoing Deputy Speaker of Parliament, Teima Onorio. Elections were postponed in two atolls due to the late arrival of ballots. In the second round of the election on 28 October 21 more candidates were elected, bringing the total elected by the end of the second round to 43. In an unprecedented election, Kiribati had to hold a third round of elections on November 3, 2011 due to a tie in one district.

There were concerns that people would not vote. Officials told the media that voter participation was low, which caused officials to do a tour of the country and advocate for people to vote. Official voter turnout rates are unavailable for all the constituencies of Kiribati.

== Results ==
Out of the 44 elected seats, 30 members were reelected. The Pillars of Truth Party received 15 seats, a reduction of 3 seats compared to the last election. The United Coalition Party did not receive any seats, losing 7 since the last election; however, merged with Karikirakean Tei-Kiribati. The Karikirakean Tei-Kiribati gained 10 seats and the Maurin Kiribati Party gained 3. Independent politicians make up the rest of the Kiribati Parliament, accounting for 16 seats, an increase of 2 seats since the last election.

Party	Seats
Pillars of Truth	15
United Coalition Party	10
Maurin Kiribati Party	3
Independents	16
Appointed members	2
Total	46
Source: IFES

=== Elected and appointed members ===
Member of Parliament	Constituency
James Taom	Makin
Pinto Katia	Makin
Alexander Teabo	Butaritari
Tinian Reiher	Butaritari
Patrick Tatireta	Marakei
Rutiano Benetito	Marakei
Teatao Teannaki	Abaiang
Tetaake Kwong	Abaiang
Kautu Tenaua	Abaiang
Nabuti Mwemwenikarawa	North Tarawa
Boutu Bateriki	North Tarawa
Inatio Tanentoa	North Tarawa
Teburoro Tito	South Tarawa
Maere Tekanene	South Tarawa
Mareko Tofinga	South Tarawa
Ioteba Redfern	Betio
Tangariki Reete	Betio
Martin Tofinga	Betio
Anote Tong	Maiana
Teiwaki Areieta	Maiana
Tom Murdoch	Kuria
Martin Moreti	Aranuka
Tiarite Tioti Kwong	Abemama
Willie Tokataake	Abemama
Ieremia Tabai	Nonouti
Waysang Most Kumkee	Nonouti
Tetaua Taitai	Tabiteuea North
Taberannang Timeon	Tabiteuea North
Tebuai Uaai	Tabiteuea South
Taneti Maamau	Onotoa
Kouraiti Beniato	Onotoa
Tetabo Nakara	Beru
Kirabuke Teiaaua	Beru
Rimeta Beniamina	Nikunau
Mote Terukaio	Nikuanu
Matiota Kairo	Tamana
Teima Onorio	Arorae
Tawita Temoku	Kiritimati
Jacob Teem	Kiritimati
Kirata Temamaka	Kitirimati
Tekiau Aretaateta	Tabuaeran
Teetan Mweretaka	Tabuaeran
Rereao Tetaake Eria	Teraina
Timon R. Aneri (appointed)	Banaba
Paulo Vanualailai (nominated)	Rabi Island (Fiji)
Source: Parliament

=== Presidential politics ===
After the first round of the election, three people came forward and announced their intent to run for president of Kiribati. Anote Tong from Maiana ran with Maere Tekanene from South Tarawa for the Pillars of Truth party. Tetaua Taitai from Tabiteuea North ran under the Karikirakean Tei-Kiribati party. Mr. Rimeta Beniamina ran under the Maurin Kiribati Party. A central issue for the candidates was the relationship between Kiribati and China. Chinese military ambitions in the Pacific and recognition of Taiwan have been concerns for the parliament and presidential candidates alike. Chinese-owned businesses had sharply increased during the time of the preceding parliament, raising concerns over possible corruption related to Chinese immigration, work status, and investment. Anote Tong and Maere Tekanene from the Pillars of Truth won the presidency and vice presidency, respectively.
