= List of political parties in Kiribati =

This article lists political parties in Kiribati. Kiribati has an informal party system, and the website of the House of Assembly of Kiribati says the following on the topic:

"The parties are loose groupings rather than disciplined blocks, with little or no structure. Members may change allegiance on a number of occasions during their tenure. It is also common for members to vote according to the special interests of their electorate on certain issues."

== Current parties ==
Party	Abbr.	Est.	Leader	House seats
Tobwaan Kiribati Party	TKP	2016	Taneti Maamau	33 / 45
Boutokaan Kiribati Moa Party	BKM	2020	Tessie Eria Lambourne	8 / 45

== Former parties ==
- Gilbertese National Party (1965), first party of the Gilbert and Ellice Islands colony
- Kamanoan Kiribati Party (KKP), created in August 2020
- Kiribati First Party (2019–2020)
- Kiribati Independent Party
- Maurin Kiribati Party (–2016)
- National Progressive Party created in the Gilbert Islands colony
- Pillars of Truth (–2020)
- Protect the Maneaba (1985–2010), also known as the Christian Democratic Party
- United Coalition Party (2010–2016)

== See also ==
- Politics of Kiribati
- List of political parties by country
