= Maere Tekanene =

I-Kiribati politician

Education Minister
- In office January 19, 2012 – March 15, 2016
- President: Anote Tong
- Preceded by: James Taom
- Succeeded by: Alexander Teabo

Member of Parliament for South Tarawa
- In office October 28, 2011 – January 7, 2016 Serving with Teburoro Tito and Mareko Tofinga

Personal details
- Party: Pillars of Truth

Maere Tekanene is a former I-Kiribati politician, and part of the Pillars of Truth party, who was the Kiribati Member of Parliament for the South Tarawa constituency from 2011, and the Education Minister from 2012, until losing her seat at the 2015–16 parliamentary election.

== Career ==
Prior to entering the political sphere, Maere Takanene worked as a teacher at the Government school in South Tarawa. She was a consultant for the Pacific Foundation for the Advancement of Women in their report on the status of women and the Convention on the Elimination of All Forms of Discrimination Against Women in 2003. Between 2006 and 2007, she was Acting Secretary to Parliament Committees for the Kiribati House of Assembly. In 2007, she was again a consultant, but for the United Nations Development Programme in their first national report on the Millennium Development Goals. She then worked first as a researcher, and then team leader for the Gender-Based Violence and Child Abuse Study at the Ministry of Internal and Social Affairs, and between 2010 and 2011 she was also Vice President for the Interim Kiribati Women in Politics Association.

She stood independently in the 2011 Kiribati parliamentary election, becoming one of four female Members of Parliament elected. Afterwards, she said that she was still considering which of the political parties to join, with her primary focus being on helping the women of her local constituency finding new markets in which to sell their handicrafts. She is one of three MPs for South Tarawa, alongside Teburoro Tito and Mareko Tofinga.

When President Anote Tong named his new cabinet on January 19, 2012, Tekanene was named as Minister of Education. She was one of six new appointees to the cabinet. One of her objectives in the role was to improve the sex education available in schools. She was replaced in the cabinet by Alexander Teabo on March 15, 2016. This was the first cabinet of new President Taneti Mamau of the Tobwaan Kiribati Party.
