= Elections in Kiribati =

Elections in Kiribati are held every 4 years or, earlier, after a no confidence vote. They consist in the national elections of the Maneaba ni Maungatabu from whom is then elected the Beretitenti, shortly after, by the people. They are also local elections of the Councils (one council in each inhabited island and 3 councils in Tarawa).

Kiribati elects on national level a legislature and then a head of state - the president. The president is elected for a four-year term by the people. The House of Assembly (Maneaba ni Maungatabu) has 45 members, 44 elected for a four-year term in single-seat and multi-seat constituencies, and 1 delegate from Rabi Island representing Banaba. The initial number was of 35 in 1978, because the first elections have been held one year before independence in 1979, .

Kiribati has a Westminster system two-party system, which means that there are two dominant political parties, since 2020, but the political parties, that exist since 1965, are not central to political life.

Kiribati has an informal party system, and the website of the House of Assembly of Kiribati says the following on the topic:

The parties are loose groupings rather than disciplined blocks, with little or no structure. Members may change allegiance on a number of occasions during their tenure. It is also common for members to vote according to the special interests of their electorate on certain issues.

== Latest national elections ==
=== 2024 Presidential election ===
Candidate	Party	Votes	%
Taneti Maamau	Tobwaan Kiribati	20,676	55.05
Kaotitaake Kokoria	Independent	15,787	42.03
Bautaake Beia	Tobwaan Kiribati	1,094	2.91
Total		37,557	100
Invalid/blank votes		114	0.30
Registered voters/turnout		54,776	68.77
Source: Maneaba ni Maungatabu

=== 2024 Parliamentary election ===
Party	First round			Second round			Total seats	+/–
Party	Votes	%	Seats	Votes	%	Seats	Total seats	+/–
Tobwaan Kiribati Party							33	+11
Boutokaan Kiribati Moa Party							8	-14
Non-partisan							4	+3
Total							45	0
Registered voters/turnout								

== See also ==
- Electoral calendar
- Electoral system
