= 2024 Kiribati presidential election =

Second re-election of Taneti Maamau

- 25 October 2024
- Registered: 54,776
- Turnout: 68.77%
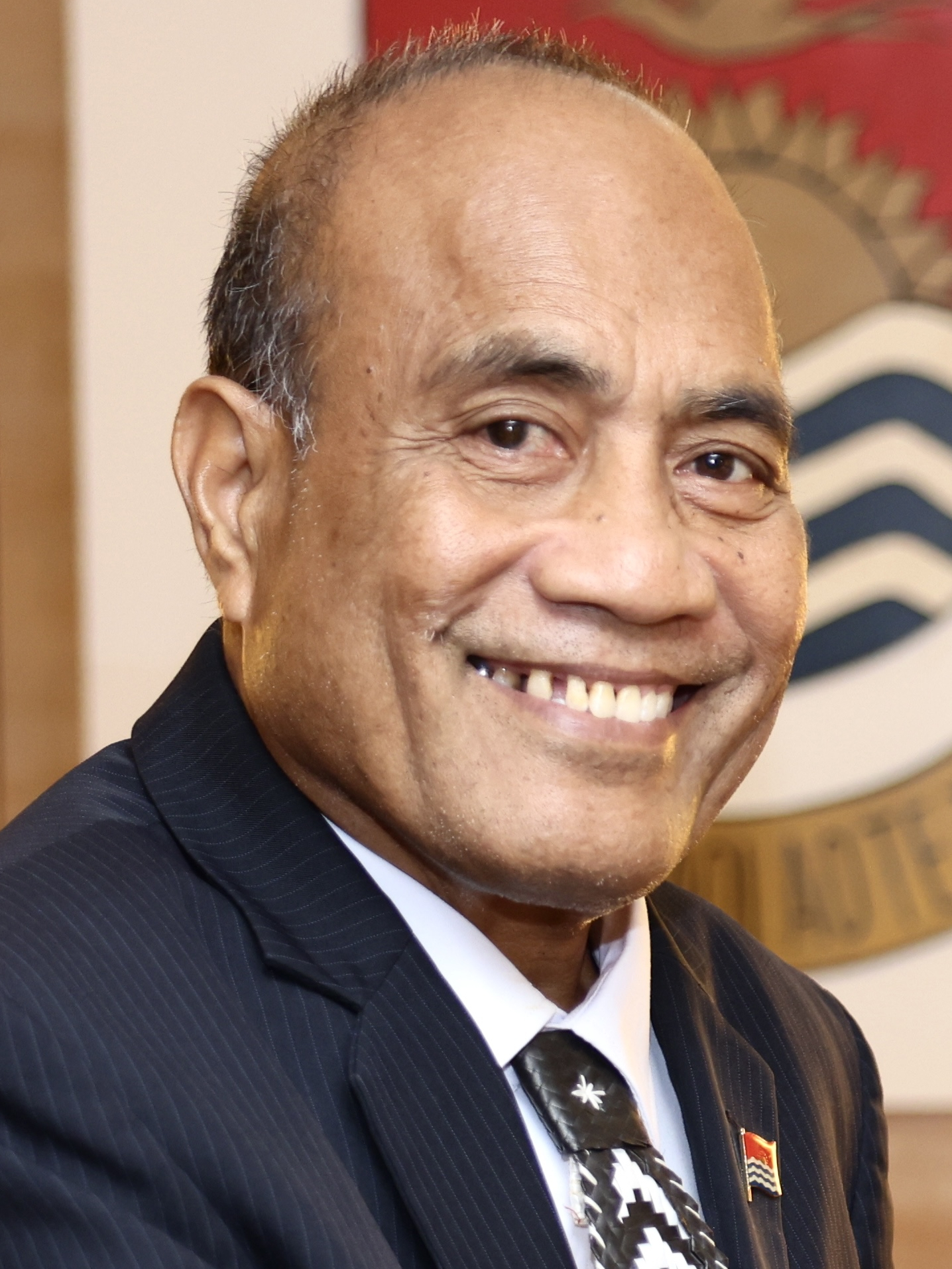

Candidate	Taneti Maamau	Kaotitaake Kokoria
Party	TKP	Independent (Note: Kaotitaake defected from the TKP just before the election to form a new alliance)
Popular vote	20,676	15,787
Percentage	55.05%	42.03%
- Map of margin of victory by electoral district
President before election
Taneti Maamau
TKP
Elected President
Taneti Maamau
TKP

Presidential elections were held in Kiribati on 25 October 2024, following parliamentary elections in August. Incumbent President Taneti Maamau of the Tobwaan Kiribati Party was re-elected with about 55% of the vote to Kaotitaake Kokoria's 42%. His inauguration took place on 1 November 2024.

== Background ==
The president is directly elected by plurality vote from three or four candidates nominated by and from among members of the House of Assembly. The parliament sits as soon as possible after the general election to elect a new Speaker and choose the candidates for the presidential election. If only three or four nominations are received, the Speaker declares those members to be the candidates for the election. If more than four nominations are received, parliament votes by secret ballot in two rounds to eliminate the surplus nominees. The Constitution does not (on its face) envisage a situation where fewer than three candidates are nominated, but the 2020 Kiribati presidential election proceeded with only two candidates. This was held to be constitutional by the High Court.

=== Candidate selection ===
The 2024 parliamentary election resulted in a supermajority for the ruling Tobwaan Kiribati Party, which was then able to block the nomination of opposition party candidates for the presidential election when parliament sat on 13 September 2024. The TKP nominated incumbent president Taneti Maamau, alongside three other members of the TKP described as "dummy candidates": Bautaake Beia from Washington (Teraina), Riteta Iorome from Onotoa, and Kaotitaake Kokoria from Fanning (Tabuaeran), all first-time members of parliament.

Opposition leader Tessie Lambourne decried the move, saying "Kiribati is now a one-party state."

== Campaign ==
On 30 September 2024 the manifestos of three of the candidates were published. It was later reported that candidate Riteta Iorome had withdrawn.

Opposition figures, including former president Ieremia Tabai, called for a boycott of the election, in protest at the exclusion of opposition candidates. Prior to the election being held, Kaotitaake Kokoria defected away from the TKP to form a new alliance, with the support of two other MPs. Taneti Maamau was widely expected to retain his position.

== Results ==
Candidate	Party	Votes	%
Taneti Maamau	Tobwaan Kiribati Party	20,676	55.05
Kaotitaake Kokoria	Independent	15,787	42.03
Bautaake Beia	Tobwaan Kiribati Party	1,094	2.91
Total		37,557	100.00
Valid votes		37,557	99.70
Invalid/blank votes		114	0.30
Total votes		37,671	100.00
Registered voters/turnout		54,776	68.77
Source: Maneaba ni Maungatabu

=== By electoral district ===
Vote share by electoral district
Electoral district	Bautaake Beia	Kaotitaake Kokoria	Taneti Maamau	Valid	Invalid/ blank	Total	Registered voters	Turnout (%)
Abaiang	81	967	1,043	2,091	4	2,095	3,176	66.0
Abemama	37	598	824	1,459	6	1,465	2,082	70.4
Aranuka	13	217	271	501	0	501	729	69.0
Arorae	16	303	64	383	0	383	530	72.3
Banaba	3	36	111	150	0	150	220	68.2
Beru	29	452	472	953	5	958	1,197	80.0
Betio	125	2,108	2,720	4,953	11	4,964	7,855	63.2
Butaritari	30	242	1,172	1,444	1	1,445	1,732	83.2
Fanning (Tabuaeran)	9	862	99	970	2	972	1,108	87.7
Kiritimati (and Kanton)	99	1,483	1,280	2,862	8	2,870	3,879	74.0
Kuria	7	314	155	476	2	478	683	70.0
Maiana	42	536	345	923	2	925	1,255	73.7
Makin	33	297	428	758	2	760	1,111	68.4
Marakei	40	211	851	1,102	0	1,102	1,552	71.1
Nikunau	31	269	639	939	2	941	1,143	82.3
Nonouti	27	661	390	1,074	0	1,078	1,484	72.6
North Tabiteuea	74	593	869	1,536	3	1,539	2,086	73.8
Onotoa	3	29	758	790	2	792	930	85.2
Rural Tarawa (North Tarawa)	87	936	1,655	2,678	17	2,695	4,183	64.4
South Tabiteuea	1	57	438	496	1	497	648	76.7
Tamana	7	125	142	274	0	274	420	65.2
Tarawa Teinainano (South Tarawa)	217	4,320	5,430	9,967	46	10,013	15,823	63.3
Teraina	83	171	520	774	0	774	950	81.5
Total	1,094	15,787	20,676	37,557	114	37,667	54,776	68.8
Source: Maneaba ni Maungatabu
