= 2020 Kiribati parliamentary election =

- 14 April 2020 (first round); 21 April 2020 (second round)

44 of the 45 seats in the House of Assembly 23 seats needed for a majority
- Turnout: 86.84% (first round); 87.88% (second round)
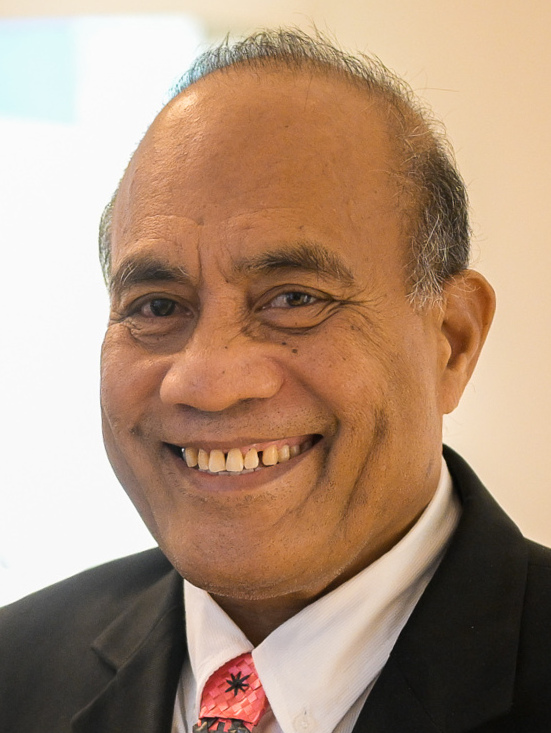

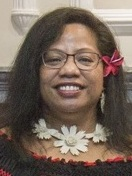
	First party	Second party
Leader	Taneti Maamau	Tessie Eria Lambourne
Party	TKP	BKM
Leader's seat	Onotoa	Abemama
Last election	31	13
Seats won	22	22
Seat change	▼9	▲9
Speaker before election
Tebuai Uaai
TKP
Elected Speaker
Tangariki Reete
BKM

Parliamentary elections were held in Kiribati in 2020 to elect members of the House of Assembly. The elections were originally planned on 7 April 2020, with a second round of voting to be held on 15 April 2020. However, in late March the Electoral Commission changed the voting date to 14 April 2020, with a second round on 21 April 2020.

The elections resulted in President Taneti Maamau's pro-China Tobwaan Kiribati Party losing a majority in parliament to parties either supportive of Taiwan or critical of his handling of diplomatic recognition of China. However, on 22 May, during the first meeting of the new House, the 44 MPs were equally divided on two benches, with 22 supporting the new Boutokaan Kiribati Moa Party and 22 the Tobwaan Kiribati Party.

== Electoral system ==
Of the 45 members of the House of Assembly, 44 were elected in 23 single- and multi-member constituencies (seven with one seat, eleven with two seats and five with three seats) using a modified two-round system. One member was chosen by the Rabi Council of Leaders to represent the Banaban community on Rabi Island in Fiji, while the Speaker is elected after the elections, from outside the House of Assembly, and does not participate in votes.

Voters have as many votes to cast as the number of seats in their constituencies. In the first round a candidate is elected if they receive more than 50% of the ballots cast. Where not all seats are filled, a second round is held with the number of candidates being equal to the number of seats remaining to be filled plus two, with those who received the fewest votes in the first round being eliminated. A tie in the second round results in a third round of voting.

== Results ==
In the 2020 Kiribati parliamentary elections, the Tobwaan Kiribati Party (TKP) retained its position as the largest party, securing 13 out of 44 seats. Following the elections, the Boutokaan te Koaua (BTK) and the Kiribati Moa Party (KMP) merged to form the Boutokaan Kiribati Moa (BKM).

In the newly elected Parliament, TKP and BTK, along with their allies, each held 22 seats. Tangariki Reete became the first woman in Kiribati to be elected Speaker of the House of Assembly. The presidential candidates endorsed by the House were the outgoing President Taneti Maamau (TKP) and Banuera Berina (BKM).

David Christopher was elected by the Rabi Council of Leaders on 29 April 2020.

Taneti Maamau was re-elected President on 22 June 2020. These elections were the first held after Kiribati switched allegiance from Taiwan to China in 2019. The electoral campaign focused on climate change, and President Maamau pledged to boost tourism in the country. The political landscape saw defections and party mergers, with notable criticism of the decision to switch alliances.

Party	First round			Second round			Total seats	+/–
Party	Votes	%	Seats	Votes	%	Seats	Total seats	+/–
Boutokaan Kiribati Moa Party			13			9	22	+9
Tobwaan Kiribati Party			10			12	22	−9
Appointed members							1	–1
Total			23			21	45	–1
Valid votes	38,389	99.85		27,171	99.88			
Invalid/blank votes	56	0.15		32	0.12			
Total votes	38,445	100.00		27,203	100.00			
Registered voters/turnout	44,271	86.84		30,953	87.88			
Source: Ministry of Justice, Adam Carr, Radio Kiribati

=== By constituency ===
Abaiang
Candidate	Party	First round		Second round	
Candidate	Party	Votes	%	Votes	%
Teuea Toatu	Tobwaan Kiribati Party	1,114	49.87	1,128	
Tekena Tiroa		1,060	47.45	[data missing]	
Betero Atanibora	Tobwaan Kiribati Party	945	42.30	974	
Kautu Tenaua	Boutokaan Kiribati Moa Party	899	40.24	1,025	
Arimaere Tambwereti		508	22.74	[data missing]	
Total		4,526	100.00		
Valid votes		2,234	99.91		
Invalid/blank votes		2	0.09		
Total votes		2,236	100.00		
Registered voters/turnout		2,566	87.14		

Abemama
Candidate	Party	Votes	%
Willie Tokataake	Tobwaan Kiribati Party	778	53.51
Tessie Eria Lambourne	Boutokaan Kiribati Moa Party	758	52.13
Natan Teewe		571	39.27
Tawaia Anterea Aukitino		82	5.64
Total		2,189	100.00
Valid votes		1,454	99.86
Invalid/blank votes		2	0.14
Total votes		1,456	100.00
Registered voters/turnout		1,583	91.98

Aranuka
Candidate	Party	Votes	%
Martin Moreti	Tobwaan Kiribati Party	346	55.36
Tianeti Ioane		218	34.88
Amberoti Nikora		61	9.76
Total		625	100.00
Valid votes		625	100.00
Invalid/blank votes		0	0.00
Total votes		625	100.00
Registered voters/turnout		656	95.27

Arorae
Candidate	Party	Votes	%
Teima Onorio	Boutokaan Kiribati Moa Party	275	58.64
Ioane Tanieru		194	41.36
Total		469	100.00
Valid votes		469	100.00
Invalid/blank votes		0	0.00
Total votes		469	100.00
Registered voters/turnout		501	93.61

Banaba
Candidate	Party	Votes	%
Tibanga Taratai	Boutokaan Kiribati Moa Party	127	75.15
Eribati Totibau		42	24.85
Total		169	100.00
Valid votes		169	100.00
Invalid/blank votes		0	0.00
Total votes		169	100.00
Registered voters/turnout		172	98.26

Beru
Candidate	Party	Votes	%
England Iuta	Boutokaan Kiribati Moa Party	728	67.66
Bwatoromaio Kiritian	Boutokaan Kiribati Moa Party	586	54.46
Tetabo Nakara		280	26.02
Teunroko Anruuti		168	15.61
James Korona Teriba		126	11.71
Total		1,888	100.00
Valid votes		1,076	100.00
Invalid/blank votes		0	0.00
Total votes		1,076	100.00
Registered voters/turnout		1,155	93.16

Betio (BTC)
Candidate	Party	First round		Second round	
Candidate	Party	Votes	%	Votes	%
Tinte Itinteang	Tobwaan Kiribati Party	2,111	47.74	2,352	
Tebao Awerika	Tobwaan Kiribati Party	1,519	34.35	1,993	
Ioteba Redfern	Tobwaan Kiribati Party	1,473	33.31	2,041	
Tangariki Reete	Boutokaan Kiribati Moa Party	1,252	28.31	1,950	
Martin Tofinga		1,153	26.07	[data missing]	
Rutiano Benetito		729	16.49		
Kianteata Teabo		728	16.46		
Toani Benson		396	8.96		
Susan Tebaau		103	2.33		
John Tabito Tokaibure		93	2.10		
Total		9,557	100.00		
Valid votes		4,422	99.68		
Invalid/blank votes		14	0.32		
Total votes		4,436	100.00		
Registered voters/turnout		6,352	69.84		

Butaritari
Candidate	Party	Votes	%
Tinian Reiher	Boutokaan Kiribati Moa Party	932	64.45
Alexander Teabo	Tobwaan Kiribati Party	776	53.67
Koria Tamuera		548	37.90
Total		2,256	100.00
Valid votes		1,446	100.00
Invalid/blank votes		0	0.00
Total votes		1,446	100.00
Registered voters/turnout		1,506	96.02

Kiritimati
Candidate	Party	First round		Second round	
Candidate	Party	Votes	%	Votes	%
Mikarite Temari	Tobwaan Kiribati Party	1,643	47.43	1,820	28.79
Jacob Tieikabu Teem	Boutokaan Kiribati Moa Party	1,434	41.40	1,434	22.69
Bakaia Kiabo	Boutokaan Kiribati Moa Party	1,256	36.26	1,344	21.26
Kirata Temamaka		1,034	29.85	1,290	20.41
Kataebati Bataua		694	20.03	433	6.85
Nancy Mikaere		344	9.93		
Inatio Tanentoa		262	7.56		
Taburea Tomataake		253	7.30		
Rutio Bangao		204	5.89		
Ngaruenga Tianere		202	5.83		
Kaitama Toroto		131	3.78		
Kabure Temariti		88	2.54		
Total		7,545	100.00	6,321	100.00
Valid votes		3,464	99.88		
Invalid/blank votes		4	0.12		
Total votes		3,468	100.00		
Registered voters/turnout		3,719	93.25		

Kuria
Candidate	Party	Votes	%
Banuera Berina	Boutokaan Kiribati Moa Party	344	54.86
Tom Robati Murdoch		162	25.84
Iaon Inatio		121	19.30
Total		627	100.00
Valid votes		627	99.68
Invalid/blank votes		2	0.32
Total votes		629	100.00
Registered voters/turnout		665	94.59

Maiana
Candidate	Party	First round		Second round	
Candidate	Party	Votes	%	Votes	%
Koraubati Remuera	Boutokaan Kiribati Moa Party	705	66.01		
Vincent Tong	Boutokaan Kiribati Moa Party	475	44.48	498	
David Collins		372	34.83	[data missing]	
Kaure Babo		326	30.52	[data missing]	
Total		1,878	100.00		
Valid votes		1,068	99.81		
Invalid/blank votes		2	0.19		
Total votes		1,070	100.00		
Registered voters/turnout		1,103	97.01		

Makin
Candidate	Party	Votes	%
James Taom	Tobwaan Kiribati Party	798	75.35
Pinto Katia	Boutokaan Kiribati Moa Party	786	74.22
Karea Paul Chen Baireti		324	30.59
Total		1,908	100.00
Valid votes		1,059	99.34
Invalid/blank votes		7	0.66
Total votes		1,066	100.00
Registered voters/turnout		1,105	96.47

Marakei
Candidate	Party	Votes	%
Ruateki Tekaiara	Tobwaan Kiribati Party	869	67.94
Moannata Ientaake	Tobwaan Kiribati Party	644	50.35
Patrick Tatireta		434	33.93
Ioteba Tebau		308	24.08
Ioane Namoriki		133	10.40
Total		2,388	100.00
Valid votes		1,279	100.00
Invalid/blank votes		0	0.00
Total votes		1,279	100.00
Registered voters/turnout		1,369	93.43

Nikunau
Candidate	Party	First round		Second round	
Candidate	Party	Votes	%	Votes	%
Ribanataake Tiwau	Tobwaan Kiribati Party	415	48.20	390	
Tauanei Marea	Tobwaan Kiribati Party	379	44.02	436	
Rimeta Beniamina		350	40.65	387	
Ngutu Metutera Awira		214	24.85	[data missing]	
Matana Anterea		154	17.89		
Total		1,512	100.00		
Valid votes		861	99.77		
Invalid/blank votes		2	0.23		
Total votes		863	100.00		
Registered voters/turnout		899	96.00		

Nonouti
Candidate	Party	First round		Second round	
Candidate	Party	Votes	%	Votes	%
Dennis Waysang Kumkee		588	43.11	[data missing]	
Ieremia Tabai	Boutokaan Kiribati Moa Party	530	38.86	640	
Bonteman Tabera	Boutokaan Kiribati Moa Party	482	35.34	629	
Elliot Ali		386	28.30	[data missing]	
Teekoa Iuta		223	16.35		
Toromon Katua		62	4.55		
Total		2,271	100.00		
Valid votes		1,364	99.78		
Invalid/blank votes		3	0.22		
Total votes		1,367	100.00		
Registered voters/turnout		1,431	95.53		

North Tarawa (ETC)
Candidate	Party	First round		Second round	
Candidate	Party	Votes	%	Votes	%
Harry Tekaiti	Boutokaan Kiribati Moa Party	1,568	48.45	1,718	
Atarake Nataara		841	25.99	[data missing]	
Terieta Mwemwenikeaki	Boutokaan Kiribati Moa Party	826	25.53	1,398	
Boutu Bateriki Baare	Tobwaan Kiribati Party	777	24.01	1,197	
Emil Uri Tuuti		771	23.83	[data missing]	
Nabuti Mwemwenikarawa		604	18.67		
Baraam Tetaeka		449	13.88		
Teiraoi Tetabea		389	12.02		
Taitii Waitie		334	10.32		
Maiaa Iona		270	8.34		
Total		6,829	100.00		
Valid votes		3,236	99.91		
Invalid/blank votes		3	0.09		
Total votes		3,239	100.00		
Registered voters/turnout		3,649	88.76		

Onotoa
Candidate	Party	Votes	%
Taaneti Mamau	Tobwaan Kiribati Party	698	85.85
Taiaki Irata	Tobwaan Kiribati Party	415	51.05
Kouraiti Beniato		386	47.48
Total		1,499	100.00
Valid votes		813	99.88
Invalid/blank votes		1	0.12
Total votes		814	100.00
Registered voters/turnout		840	96.90

South Tarawa (TUC)
Candidate	Party	First round		Second round	
Candidate	Party	Votes	%	Votes	%
Shiu-Fung Jong	Boutokaan Kiribati Moa Party	3,202		4,081	
Taoaba Kaiea	Tobwaan Kiribati Party	2,846		3,092	
Taabeta Teakai	Tobwaan Kiribati Party	2,828		4,180	
Kourabi Nenem		1,686		[data missing]	
Baantarawa Ietimeta		1,213		[data missing]	
Semilota Finauga		800			
Tabuia Taboree		518			
Barry Nawere		398			
Mareko Tofinga		383			
Beniera Kaitia		257			
Eritoa Tewakura Kookia		257			
Takaria Ubwaitoi		252			
Nokite Abiteti		227			
Tamuera Rikate		[data missing]			
Teimarawa Itakara		[data missing]			
Tekeeua Kauongo		[data missing]			
Tirikai Tiraim		[data missing]			
Total					
Valid votes		8,514	99.89		
Invalid/blank votes		9	0.11		
Total votes		8,523	100.00		
Registered voters/turnout		10,454	81.53		

Tabiteuea North
Candidate	Party	Votes	%
Tarakabu Tofinga	Tobwaan Kiribati Party	805	54.36
Taberannang Timeon	Boutokaan Kiribati Moa Party	755	50.98
Kobebe Taitai		750	50.64
Total		2,310	100.00
Valid votes		1,481	99.93
Invalid/blank votes		1	0.07
Total votes		1,482	100.00
Registered voters/turnout		1,651	89.76

Tabiteuea South
Candidate	Party	First round		Second round	
Candidate	Party	Votes	%	Votes	%
Booti Nauan	Tobwaan Kiribati Party	286	39.89	315	
Titabu Tabane		241	33.61	[data missing]	
Teorae Kabure		190	26.50	[data missing]	
Total		717	100.00		
Valid votes		717	99.58		
Invalid/blank votes		3	0.42		
Total votes		720	100.00		
Registered voters/turnout		768	93.75		

Tabuaeran
Candidate	Party	Votes	%
Tekiau Aretateta	Boutokaan Kiribati Moa Party	510	
Tewaaki Kobae	Boutokaan Kiribati Moa Party	483	
Edwin Baraniko		[data missing]	
Teakin Iakobwa		[data missing]	
Teraawati Kinta		[data missing]	
Total			
Valid votes		788	100.00
Invalid/blank votes		0	0.00
Total votes		788	100.00
Registered voters/turnout		850	92.71

Tamana
Candidate	Party	Votes	%
Tekeeua Tarati	Tobwaan Kiribati Party	384	86.49
Tenoa Betene		60	13.51
Total		444	100.00
Valid votes		444	99.78
Invalid/blank votes		1	0.22
Total votes		445	100.00
Registered voters/turnout		459	96.95

Teraina
Candidate	Party	Votes	%
Nantongo Timeon	Boutokaan Kiribati Moa Party	506	64.96
Kaiaia Teatoi		257	32.99
Rerekannang Terakau		16	2.05
Total		779	100.00
Valid votes		779	100.00
Invalid/blank votes		0	0.00
Total votes		779	100.00
Registered voters/turnout		818	95.23
