= 2012 Kiribati presidential election =

Second re-election of Anote Tong

- 13 January 2012
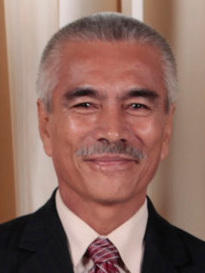

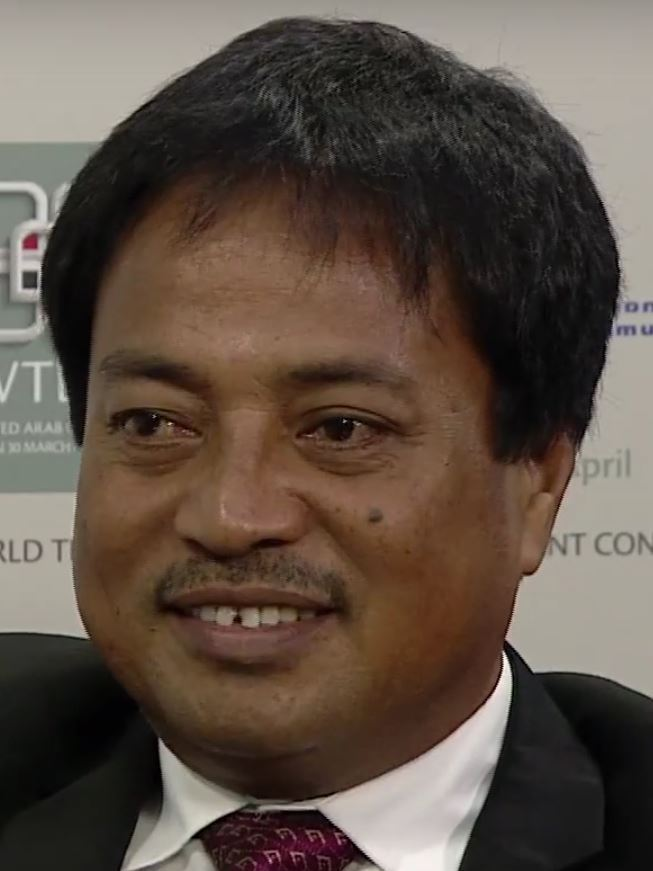
Candidate	Anote Tong	Tetaua Taitai	Rimeta Beniamina
Party	PTK	KTK	MKP
Popular vote	14,315	11,886	7,738
Percentage	42.18%	35.02%	22.80%
Home Island	Tabuaeran	Tabiteuea	Nikunau
President before election
Anote Tong
Elected President
Anote Tong

Presidential elections were held in Kiribati on 13 January 2012, following two-round parliamentary elections held in October 2011. Incumbent President Anote Tong sought re-election to a third four-year term, ending months of speculation about his decision.

Tong beat Tetaua Taitai of the United Coalition Party and Rimeta Beniamina of the Maurin Kiribati Party with a little over 42% of the vote.

== Background ==
The elections, initially scheduled for 30 December 2011, were postponed to 13 January 2012 in order to allow citizens of the country to travel to celebrate the New Year.

== Electoral system ==
The president was elected by popular vote from among three or four candidates chosen by MPs, and was limited to three four-year terms under the constitution.

== Campaign ==
The new House of Assembly of Kiribati nominated three candidates for the presidency following the 2011 parliamentary election.

- Anote Tong, incumbent President of Kiribati since 2003, member of Pillars of Truth
- Tetaua Taitai, physician and politician, member of the United Coalition Party
- Rimeta Beniamina, former leader of the United Coalition Party and standing on behalf of the Maurin Kiribati Party

== Results ==
Incumbent President Anote Tong was the outright winner and re-elected as president of Kiribati, with an aggregate total of 14,315 votes or 42% of the total vote. President Tong defeated his closest challenger, Tetaui Taitai, by more than 7%, or 2,500 votes. The third challenger, Rimeta Beniamina, only received 7,738 votes. Tong was the leading candidate in 14 out of the 23 constituencies.

President Tong's percentage of the vote (42%) was much less than his 2007 re-election, when he received 64% of the popular vote.

Voter turnout was approximately 68% for the election. This was higher than the 2007 presidential elections, when voter participation was a little over 50%.

Candidate	Party	Votes	%
Anote Tong	Pillars of Truth	14,315	42.18
Tetaua Taitai	United Coalition Party	11,886	35.02
Rimeta Beniamina	Maurin Kiribati Party	7,738	22.80
Total		33,939	100.00
Registered voters/turnout		49,910	–
Source: IFES
