= Kaotitaake Kokoria =

I-Kiribati politician (1979)

Member of the House of Assembly
- Incumbent
- Assumed office August 2024 Serving with Matanga Aran
- Preceded by: Tekiau Aretateta; Tewaaki Kobae
- Constituency: Tabuaeran

Personal details
- Born: 28 October 1979 (age 46) Paelau, Tabuaeran, Kiribati
- Party: Independent

Kaotitaake Kokoria (born 28 October 1979) is an I-Kiribati politician. He is a member of the House of Assembly serving since August 2024. He was a candidate for the 2024 Kiribati presidential election and finished second place with 42% of the vote.

== Biography ==
Kaotitaake was born on 28 October 1979 in the village of Paelau, on the island of Tabuaeran in Kiribati. He began his education at Edmund Primary School and later attended Meleang Tabai Secondary School, both on Tabuaeran. He attended high school in South Tarawa at William Goward Memorial School, then received a degree in 2006 from the University of the South Pacific (USP) Kiribati campus. He earned a graduate certificate in public administration in 2016, and a Master of Business Administration (MBA) from USP Kiribati in 2019.

After briefly working as a teacher, Kaotitaake joined the Kiribati Ministry of Internal and Social Affairs (MISA), later named the Ministry of Culture and Internal Affairs (MCIA). He was a member of several divisions, including the rural planning division, where he rose from Assistant Rural Development Officer in 2008 to Senior Rural Development Officer by 2015, and then became the Deputy Director overseeing the division from 2015 to 2017. He also oversaw the Culture and Museum Division and worked for a time as the Third Secretary for the Administration Division. By 2022, he was the Senior Assistant Secretary in the MCIA.

In 2024, Kaotitaake ran for election to the House of Assembly to represent Tabuaeran, and won one of two seats (along with Matanga Aran), receiving 665 votes. He ran as a member of the Tobwaan Kiribati Party (TKP) which won a supermajority in the legislature. In September 2024, Kaotitaake was announced as one of four nominees for president in the October presidential election, along with three other members of the TKP (later two after Riteta Iorome withdrew) including incumbent Taneti Maamau, and Bautaake Beia. Kaotitaake and Bautaake were both described as "dummy candidates," as the TKP blocked out opposition candidates from the election in a move decried by the opposition as making "Kiribati now a one-party state." Shortly before the election, Kaotitaake defected from the TKP and formed a new alliance, receiving the support of the opposition parties in the presidential race. Taneti won the election, with Kaotitaake finishing second with 42% of the vote.
