= Ministry of Health and Medical Services =

Ministry of Health and Medical Services may refer to:

- Ministry of Health and Medical Services (Fiji)
- Ministry of Health and Medical Services (Kiribati)
- Ministry of Health and Medical Services (Solomon Islands)
