= MHMS =

MHMS may refer to:

- Ministry of Health and Medical Services (Kiribati)
- Ministry of Health and Medical Services (Solomon Islands)

Schools

- Murray Hill Middle School - Howard County Public School System
- Mary Hoge Middle School - Weslaco Independent School District
- Mansur Habibullah Memorial School
- Merrol Hyde Magnet School
