= Teaiwa =

Teaiwa is a surname. Notable people with the surname include:

- Katerina Teaiwa, a Pacific scholar, artist and teacher of Banaban, I-Kiribati and African American heritage
- Teresia Teaiwa (1968–2017), an I-Kiribati and African-American scholar, poet, activist and mentor

== See also ==
- Koriri Teaiwa Tenieu, an I-Kiribati politician
