= Ministry of Internal Affairs (Kiribati) =

Government ministry of Kiribati

The Ministry of Internal Affairs (MIA) is a government ministry of Kiribati, headquartered in South Tarawa.

The minister is responsible of:

- Local government
- Support services to Island Councils
- Decentralization
- Rural Development for all Islands except Line and Phoenix Islands,
- Electoral Commission and National Elections
- Community Development
- Police Services Communication and Improvement Fund
- Health Services Communication and Improvement Fund
- Cultural Affairs and Museum
- Village Bank
- Outer Island Development Program
- Liquor

== Ministers ==
- 1979
- 2003
- Kouraiti Beniato (2007–2011)
- Teima Onorio (2011–2016) as Internal and Social Affairs
- Kobebe Taitai (2018–2020)
- Boutu Bateriki (2020–)
