= Alexander Teabo =

I-Kiribati politician

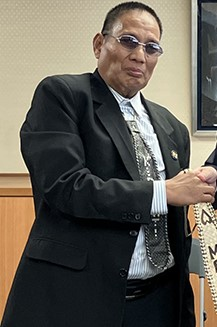
- Teabo in 2025

Minister of Education
- Incumbent
- Assumed office 2020
- President: Taneti Maamau
- Preceded by: David Collins

Minister of Environment, Land and Agricultural Development
- In office 2016–2020

Member of the Parliament of Kiribati
- Incumbent
- Assumed office 2007
- Constituency: Butaritari

Personal details
- Born: Butaritari, Kiribati
- Party: Tobwaan Kiribati Party
- Education: University of the South Pacific
- Website: www.moe.gov.ki

Alexander Teabo is an I-Kiribati politician currently serving as the Minister of Education of Kiribati since 2020. He has served as a Member of the Parliament of Kiribati from the Butaritari constituency since 2007 and has formerly served as the Minister of Environment, Land and Agricultural Development from 2016 to 2020.

== Career ==
Alexander Teabo was first elected to the Parliament of Kiribati in 2007, as a Member of the Ninth Parliament representing the Butaritari constituency. In 2012, he was reelected and his term ended in 2015.

In 2016, Teabo was reelected, as a Member of the 11th Parliament this time. That year, he became the Minister of Environment, Land and Agricultural Development.

In 2020, Teabo was reelected as MP and appointed as the Minister of Education of Kiribati. In the 2024 Kiribati parliamentary election, his seat wasn't contested.

== Political views ==
In 2024, Teabo approved of and defended President Taneti Maamau's controversial removal of High Court Judge David Lambourne from his position during the 2022 Kiribati constitutional crisis. A United Nations expert criticised the move by Maamau and called it a "major setback for justice".

=== Climate change ===
Teabo has emphasised the damage Kiribati suffers from climate change and its need to have monetary contributions to the Pacific Climate Resilience Facility regarding the issue.

=== China policy ===
In 2019, according to the "One China" policy, Kiribati switched its diplomatic relations from the Republic of China to the People's Republic of China (PRC). Teabo supported and defended this change in Kiribati's foreign policy, stating that Kiribati is just "follow[ing] the world". He blamed the opposition to the PRC on "agenda from somewhere".

=== West Papua and New Caledonia ===
Sympathising with indigenous people of West Papua, Teabo called them brothers. Regarding the 2024 New Caledonia unrest, he foresaw the independence of New Caledonia from France.
