= Marine Training Centre =

- Type: Public
- Established: 1967
- Principal: Cristian Mita (2019)
- Students: 90 graduates (average on 50 years)
- Location: Kiribati; 1.35427228097°N 172.9396212477°E

The Marine Training Centre Tarawa (MTC) is a training school for seafarers founded in 1967 in Betio, Tarawa, Kiribati. It is a division of the Ministry of Employment and Human Resources of the Government of Kiribati.

The Marine Training Centre, mainly funded by Germany (Hamburg Süd), European Union, New Zealand aid, and Japan, is approved to conduct training by the Marine Division of the Ministry, being the Maritime Authority of the Government.

== History ==
A cargo ship of the German shipping company Hamburg Süd had an injured crew member in 1964 – the captain's report on the skilled fishermen of the Gilbert and Ellice Islands in Tarawa gave him the idea of recruiting these seamen.

As a merchant marine training school, MTC is now owned and funded by the government of Kiribati. MTC was established in 1967 by the British Government, the United Nations Development Programme (UNDP), the British shipping China Navigation Company, and Hamburg Süd, being part of the SPMS (South Pacific Marine Services).

The Government had the following objectives when they founded the Centre:

- to train ratings for employment on overseas ships. Initially employment was to be on the vessels of the two sponsoring companies. Gilbert and Ellice Islands' seamen were to work in the Deck, Engine and Catering Departments.
- to provide overseas employment for young Gilbert and Ellice Islanders enabling them to earn more money than they could at home.
- to increase the flow of foreign currency into the Gilbert and Ellice Islands from the remittances of the seamen working overseas.
- to provide income for the community as a whole from these being a major hindrance to employment growth, comparison on neighboring countries’ rates such as Tuvalu and others and other relevant recommendations from members.

Over the 50 year period since its creation to date, MTC has provided training to:

- more than 6,300 people, 4,520 (72%) of whom have graduated;
- 78 women, plus those trained for the Norwegian Cruise Line (NCL).

== Economy ==
The MTC is since its creation the most important source of private sector employment for Kiribati, generating significant foreign exchange earnings. More than 3,700 trainees have been graduated between 1984-2017. This situation created jobs with German shipping lines, with an average of 936 jobs filled per year. Remittances from wages earned while overseas provide a source of foreign revenue for the Kiribati economy and support to the extended families of the seafarers.

== Partners ==
=== Merchant marine ===
South Pacific Marine Services (SPMS) and its partners:

- Hamburg Süd
- Reederei Nord
- Leonhardt & Blumberg
- F. Laeisz
- Aug. Bolten
- Fisser & v. Doornum

=== Fishing industry ===
- Japan Marine Service
- Kiribati Fisherman Services
- Kiribati Employment and Marine Services
- OTTA Services
- Central Pacific Marine
- Dojin Co. Ltd
- CPPL (Kiribati)

=== Development aid partners ===
- Government of New Zealand (NZ Aid)
- JICA (Japan)
- Taiwan ICDF (until 2019)
