= David Christopher =

Fijian politician (died 2022)

Member of the Kiribati Parliament for Rabi Island
- In office 7 January 2016 – 26 February 2022
- Preceded by: Paulo Vanualailai
- In office 1994–1998
- Preceded by: Rongorongo Terubea
- Succeeded by: Bureia Samuela

Member of the Fijian Parliament for North Eastern General
- In office September 2001 – 13 May 2006
- Preceded by: Leo Smith
- Succeeded by: Robin Irwin

Personal details
- Born: 1947 or 1948
- Died: 26 February 2022 Suva, Fiji
- Party: Soqosoqo Duavata ni Lewenivanua

David Ariu Christopher (died 26 February 2022), also known as Kariamakin Airu Christopher, was a Fijian and I-Kiribati politician of Banaban descent.

Christopher was educated at Niusawa Primary School, Queen Victoria School, Lelean Memorial School and then the University of the South Pacific. He worked for the Fiji Sugar Corporation, and then for Rabi Holdings, the investment company of the Rabi Council of Leaders. He was appointed to the Kiribati House of Assembly in 1994, serving a term of four years as representative of the Banaban people living on Rabi Island in Fiji.

At the 2001 Fijian general election, he won the North Eastern General electorate for the Soqosoqo Duavata ni Lewenivanua (SDL) of Laisenia Qarase, becoming the first Banaban elected to the House of Representatives of Fiji. He lost his seat to Robin Irwin at the 2006 election. Christopher's former constituency was one of three reserved for "General Electors" - Fijian citizens who are not of ethnic Fijian, Indian, or Rotuman descent. Following the 2006 Fijian coup d'état and the dissolution of the SDL he returned to work for the Rabi Council as executive director.

In 2016 Christopher was again appointed to fill the nominated seat for Rabi Island in the Kiribati House of Assembly. He was renominated at the 2020 Kiribati parliamentary election.
