= Rereao Tetaake Eria =

I-Kiribati politician

Rereao Tetaake Eria is a former I-Kiribati politician. Succeedin her husband Mr Tetaake Eria, she served as a member of parliament for Teraina in the ninth and tenth Parliaments of Kiribati. She represented the Pillars of Truth (Boutokan Te Koaua) party. In the 2015–16 Kiribati parliamentary election, she lost her seat to Uriam Iabeta.
