= Abete Merang =

I-Kiribati politician

Abete Merang (28 February 1926 in Arorae – 22 February 1987 in Kuria) was an I-Kiribati politician and trade unionist. He was a member of the 1974 Council of Ministries and he became Minister for Health and Community Affairs in the first Cabinet of Kiribati in 1979.

From Arorae, he was elected member of the House of Assembly, in the constituency of Urban Tarawa from 1974 to 1982.
