= Abureti Takaio =

I-Kiribati politician

Abureti Takaio is an I-Kiribati politician and academic. He was, at one time prior to the mid-1990s, Minister for the Line and Phoenix Groups. In 2002, he was an unsuccessful candidate to the Maneaba ni Maungatabu (national House of Assembly).

Takaio is the author of "Control: 'E Taku te Kamitina'", published in the book Kiribati: Aspects of History, a compendium of articles on I-Kiribati history by I-Kiribati academics.
