= North Eastern (General Electors Communal Constituency, Fiji) =

Former electoral constituency in Fiji

North Eastern General Communal is a former electoral division of Fiji, one of 3 communal constituencies reserved for General Electors, an omnibus category including Caucasians, Chinese, and all others whose ethnicity was neither indigenous Fijian nor Indo-Fijian. Established by the 1997 Constitution, it came into being in 1999 and was used for the parliamentary elections of 1999, 2001, and 2006. (Of the remaining 68 seats, 43 were reserved for other ethnic communities and 25, called Open Constituencies, were elected by universal suffrage).

The 2013 Constitution promulgated by the Military-backed interim government abolished all constituencies and established a form of proportional representation, with the entire country voting as a single electorate.

== Election results ==
In the following tables, the primary vote refers to first-preference votes cast. The final vote refers to the final tally after votes for low-polling candidates have been progressively redistributed to other candidates according to pre-arranged electoral agreements (see electoral fusion), which may be customized by the voters (see instant run-off voting).

=== 1999 ===
1999 Fijian general election: North Eastern GECC
Party	Candidate	Votes	%
UPP	Vincent Lobendahn	1,660	46.46
Independent	Leo Smith	1,326	37.11
FAP	Edward Reece	480	13.43
COIN	Anthony Long	87	2.43
Independent	Ian Simpson	20	0.56
Two-candidate-preferred result
Independent	Leo Smith	1,879	52.59
UPP	Vincent Lobendahn	1,694	47.41
Independent win			

=== 2001 ===
2001 Fijian general election: North Eastern GECC
Party	Candidate	Votes	%	±%
SDL	David Christopher	969	29.46	+29.46
Independent	Leo Smith	736	22.38	–14.73
UPP	Matilda Gibson	730	22.20	–22.46
Independent	Robin Irwin	520	15.81	+15.81
CAMV	Harry Robinson	325	9.88	+9.88
SDL	Yorckho Jo	90	2.74	+2.74
Two-candidate-preferred result
SDL	David Christopher	1,987	60.41	+60.41
Independent	Leo Smith	1,302	39.59	–20.0
SDL gain from Independent		Swing	+60.41	

=== 2006 ===
2006 Fijian general election: North Eastern GECC
Party	Candidate	Votes	%	±%
SDL	David Christopher	1,467	40.16	+10.70
Independent	Robin Irwin	629	17.22	+1.41
UPP	Harry Robinson	528	14.45	–7.75
Labour	Rebo Terubea	383	10.48	+10.48
Independent	Nawaia Touakin	357	9.77	+9.77
NAP	Rocky Billings	289	7.91	+7.91
Two-candidate-preferred result
Independent	Robin Irwin	2,014	55.13	+55.13
SDL	David Christopher	1,639	44.87	–15.54
Independent gain from SDL		Swing	+55.13	

== Sources ==
- Psephos - Adam Carr's electoral archive
- Fiji Facts
