= Ministry of Information, Communications, Transport and Tourism Development =

Government ministry of Kiribati

The Ministry of Information, Communications, Transport and Tourism Development (MICTTD) is a government ministry of Kiribati, headquartered in Betio, South Tarawa.

== Ministers ==
- Babera Kirata (1979–1982) for Works and Communications
- Temate Ereateiti (2007–2011)
- Taberannang Timeon (2011–2013)
- Rimeta Beniamina (2013–2016)
- Willie Tokataake (2016–2020)
- Tekeeua Tarati (2020–)
