= Tetaake Kwong =

I-Kiribati politician

Member of the House of Assembly
- Incumbent
- Assumed office 2012
- Constituency: Abaiang

Personal details
- Party: Pillars of Truth

Tetaake Kwong was a member of the Kiribati House of Assembly for the constituency of Abaiang.
