= Kobebe Taitai =

I-Kiribati politician

Kobebe Taitai is an I-Kiribati politician, Minister for Health and Medical Services, from 2016 to 2018, then Ministry of Internal Affairs, from 2018 to 2020. He was elected for Tabiteuea North at the 2016 Kiribati general elections. He lost his seat at the 2020 Kiribati parliamentary election. He is a member of Boutokaan te Koaua.

Hon. Taitai studied engineering in Brisbane. He is licensed aircraft maintenance engineer and was Chief Engineer for Air Kiribati Ltd for six years.

Hon. Taitai was elected vice-president of the Kiribati National Olympic Committee in March 2015. He represents the sport of Powerlifting.
