= 2016 Kiribati presidential election =

Election of Taneti Maamau

- 9 March 2016
- Turnout: 33,247
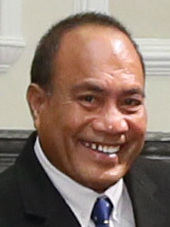

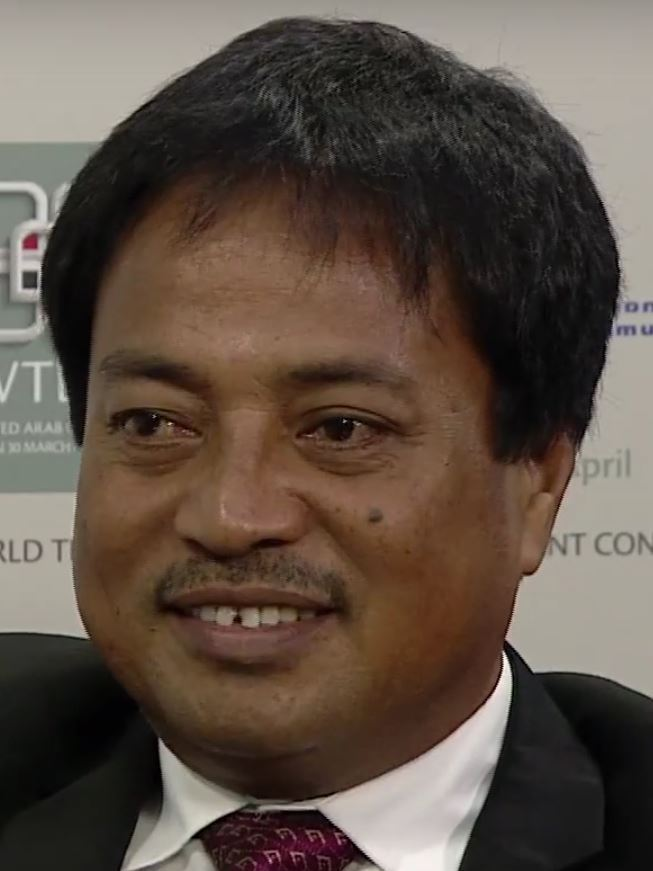
Candidate	Taneti Maamau	Rimeta Beniamina
Party	TKP	PTK
Popular vote	19,833	12,764
Percentage	59.96%	39.59%
Home Island	Onotoa	Nikunau
President before election
Anote Tong
PTK
Elected President
Taneti Maamau
TKP

Presidential elections were held in Kiribati on 9 March 2016. The result was a victory for Taneti Maamau of the Tobwaan Kiribati Party, who received 60% of the vote, with Rimeta Beniamina (United Coalition Party, but nominated by Pillars of Truth) on 38.6% and Tianeti Ioane (also Pillars of Truth) 1.5%.

== Results ==
Candidate	Party	Votes	%
Taneti Maamau	Tobwaan Kiribati Party	19,833	59.96
Rimeta Beniamina	Pillars of Truth	12,764	38.59
Tianeti Ioane	Pillars of Truth	482	1.46
Total		33,079	100.00
Valid votes		33,079	99.49
Invalid/blank votes		168	0.51
Total votes		33,247	100.00
Source: Pina
