= Shiu-Fung Jong =

I-Kiribati politician

Shiu-Fung Jong is an I-Kiribati politician. She is a member of parliament for the Tarawa Urban constituency, from the Pillars of Truth (Boutokan te Koaua) party. She was first elected in the 2015–16 Kiribati parliamentary election. and reelected at the following 2020 parliamentary election.

She is married to Jeff Jong.
