= Uriam Iabeta =

I-Kiribati politician (died 2019)

Uriam Tirae Iabeta (died 4 June 2019) was an I-Kiribati politician. He served as a member of parliament for the island of Teraina in the eleventh Parliament of Kiribati. He was aligned with the Tobwaan Kiribati Party, and won his seat during the 2015–16 Kiribati parliamentary election, defeating the incumbent Rereao Tetaake Eria.
