= Koriri Tenieu =

I-Kiribati politician

Koriri Teaiwa Tenieu is a former I-Kiribati politician. She was a member of Parliament for Tabiteuea North during the fifth Parliament of Kiribati from 2012 to 2015. She was the third woman to be elected to the House of Assembly, after Tekarei Russell in 1974 and Fenua Tamuera in 1990. During the 1991 Kiribati parliamentary election, Koriri Tenieu's husband, Teaiwa Tenieu, was found guilty of bribery, and his election was voided. A by-election was held, in which Koriri Tenieu stood and was elected. This election was then also declared void, as Teaiwa had been found to have bribed people and organisations in support of his wife.

== Bibliography ==
- Van Trease, Howard, ed. (1993). Atoll Politics: The Republic of Kiribati. University of Canterbury and University of the South Pacific. ISBN 0-9583300-0-X.
