= Ministry of Environment, Lands and Agricultural Development =

Government ministry of Kiribati

The Ministry of Environment, Lands and Agricultural Development (MELAD, Gilbertese: Botaki ibukin te enwarementa, tararuan aaba ao karikirakean te ununiki) is a government ministry of Kiribati, headquartered in Bikenibeu, South Tarawa.

It was created as Ministry of Natural Resource Development in March 1978, within the Gilbert Islands colony.

== Ministers ==
- Roniti Teiwaki (1978–1982)
- Anote Tong (1994–2002)
- Tetabo Nakara (2007–2009)
- Tiarite Kwong (2011–2016)
- Tebao Awerika (2016–2018)
- Alexander Teabo (2018–2020)
- Ruateki Tekaiara (2020–)
