= Ministry of Line and Phoenix Islands Development =

Government ministry of Kiribati

The Ministry for Line and Phoenix Islands Development (MLPID, also known by the portmanteau Linnix; Gilbertese: Botaki ibukin karikirakeaia aaba n te Aono Raina ao Rawaki) is a government ministry of Kiribati, headquartered in London, Kiritimati. It focuses on the development of the Line Islands and Phoenix Islands. The ministry was founded after the 1978 Gilbertese Chief Minister election by Ieremia Tabai.

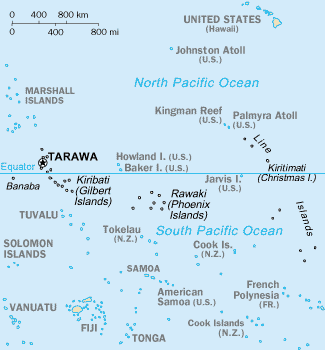
Map of Kiribati, with Line Islands on the right and Phoenix Islands in the middle

== Ministers ==
- Teewe Arobati (1978–1982)
- Ieremia Tata (1982–)
- Tekinaiti Kateie (1990–1991)
- Abureti Takaio
- Teiraoi Tetabea (1998–2002)
- Tawita Temoku (2003–2016)
- Mikarite Temari (2016–)
