= Ministry of Fisheries and Marine Resources Development =

Government ministry of Kiribati

Ministry of Fisheries & Marine Resources Development
- Botaki I bukin te aka sa ao karikirakean kaubwaira mai taari

Ministry overview
- Formed: 2003; 23 years ago
- Preceding Ministry: Ministry of Natural Resource Development
- Headquarters: Bairiki, South Tarawa, Kiribati; 1.33006°N 172.97890°E
- Minister responsible: Ribanataake Tiwau
- Website: mfmrd.gov.ki

The Ministry of Fisheries and Marine Resources Development (MFMRD, in Gilbertese, Botaki I bukin te aka sa ao karikirakean kaubwaira mai taari) is a government ministry of Kiribati, headquartered in South Tarawa.

== Ministers ==
- Taberannang Timeon (2007–2011)
- Tetabo Nakara (2016–2020)
- Ribanataake Tiwau (2020–)
