= Ministry of Employment and Human Resources =

Government ministry of Kiribati

The Ministry of Employment and Human Resources (MEHR) is a government ministry of Kiribati, headquartered in South Tarawa, Tarawa. He was created in October 2016, just after the revision of the Constitution of Kiribati that allows more than 10 ministries in the Cabinet.

== Minister ==
- Iotebwa Redfern (from October 2016)
- Mrs Taabeta Teakai (2020–)

== See also ==
- Marine Training Centre
