= Ministry of Education (Kiribati) =

Government ministry of Kiribati

The Ministry of Education (MoE) is a government ministry of Kiribati, headquartered in Bikenibeu, Tarawa, next to the King George V and Elaine Bernacchi School. As of 2018 the ministry has about 1,400 employees.

== Ministers ==
- Roniti Teiwaki (1974–1978) for the Gilbert and Ellice Islands Colony
- Teatao Teannaki (1978–1979) for Education, Training and Culture
- Ieremia Tata (1979–1982, Butaritari) for Education, Training and Culture
- Willie Tokataake (1994–2003)
- Teima Onorio (2003–2007) also Youth and Sport Development
- Maere Tekanene
- David Collins (2018–2020)
- Alexander Teabo (2020–)
