= Tessie Eria Lambourne =

I-Kiribati politician (born 1971)

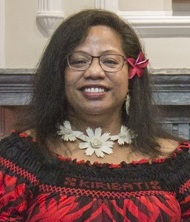
- Lambourne in 2018

Member of the Maneaba ni Maungatabu (Parliament)
- Incumbent
- In role April 2020
- Preceded by: Natan Teewe

Kiribati's Ambassador to Taiwan
- In role June 2018 – September 2019
- Preceded by: Teekoa Iuta
- Succeeded by: Embassy closed

Secretary to the Cabinet
- In role August 2016 – June 2018
- Preceded by: Teea Tiira
- Succeeded by: Naomi Biribo

Chair of BKM
- In role 22 May 2020 – August 2020
- Preceded by: Party created
- Succeeded by: Party dissolved

Leader of KKP
- Incumbent
- In role August 2020
- Preceded by: Party created

Personal details
- Born: Teretia Eria; 14 July 1971 (age 54) Onotoa, Gilbert and Ellice Islands
- Party: Kamanoan Kiribati Party (2020)
- Spouse: David Lambourne
- Children: 5
- Education: University of Auckland; University of Canterbury
- Occupation: I-Kiribati civil servant; Diplomat; Politician

Tessie Eria Lambourne (born 14 July 1971) is an I-Kiribati civil servant, diplomat and politician. She has been a member of the Maneaba ni Maungatabu (Parliament) since April 2020. She was formerly Kiribati's Ambassador to Taiwan from June 2018 to September 2019 and Secretary to the Cabinet, the highest position in Kiribati's civil service, from August 2016 until June 2018.

== Life ==
Lambourne was educated at the University of Auckland in New Zealand, where she graduated with a Bachelor of Arts (Political Studies) in 1994; she subsequently received a master's degree in International Law and Politics from the University of Canterbury in 2007. She worked in the civil service from 1991, serving in a number of prominent positions, including Private Secretary to President Teburoro Tito, Secretary for Foreign Affairs and Immigration, Secretary for Internal Affairs, and Secretary for Commerce, Industry and Cooperatives. She was appointed Secretary to the Cabinet by President Taneti Maamau in August 2016. She served in this role until she became the country's second ambassador to Taiwan in June 2018, but her tenure was ended by the breakdown of diplomatic relations between Kiribati and Taiwan on 20 September 2019.

She was elected to the Maneaba ni Maungatabu at the 2020 Kiribati parliamentary election in April 2020, winning 1 of the 2 seats for the island of Abemama "decisively" with a first-round majority. Lambourne was initially the chair of the newly formed Boutokaan Kiribati Moa party (BKM). After the 2020 presidential election the BKM dissolved and Lambourne became the first leader of the new Kamanoan Kiribati party (KKP), and Leader of the Opposition. She was re-elected at the 2024 parliamentary election. A record five women were elected to the 45 seats of the parliament. The others were Ruth Cross Kwansing, Lavinia Teatao Teem, Ruta Baabo Manate and former speaker Tangariki Reete.

She is married to David Lambourne, an Australian living in Kiribati, who was sworn in as a puisne judge of the High Court of Kiribati in 2018.

There was an attempt to have her husband deported in August 2022. It has been alleged that the efforts are politically motivated. Three Court of Appeal judges who ruled that the attempted deportation was unconstitutional were later suspended, a matter which is yet to be fully resolved. The United Nations Special Rapporteur on the Independence of Judges and Lawyers, Margaret Satterthwaite, is concerned that the country lacks a working court system.
