= Fenua Tamuera =

I-Kiribati politician

Fenua Tamuera is a former I-Kiribati politician. She was a member of Parliament for Butaritari during the fourth Parliament of Kiribati. She was the second woman to be elected to the House of Assembly, after Tekarei Russell in 1974. Originally from Tuvalu, Tamuera qualified with a General Nursing and Obstetric Nursing Certificate from the Fiji School of Nursing in 1967. She was elected to the House of Assembly after the death of her husband, Tamuera Taniera, triggered a by-election in 1990, but she lost her seat in the subsequent 1991 Kiribati parliamentary election.

== Bibliography ==
- Van Trease, Howard, ed. (1993). Atoll Politics: The Republic of Kiribati. University of Canterbury and University of the South Pacific. ISBN 0-9583300-0-X.
