= Ministry of Justice (Kiribati) =

Government ministry of Kiribati

Established in 2016, the Ministry of Justice of Kiribati is responsible for the administration of law and justice, service-related policies, prisons and the probationary system, legal aid and human rights, civil registration, elections, citizenship, customs services, and law reform. Additionally, the ministry has oversight over the Office of the Attorney General and Judiciary.

== List of ministers ==
- Natan Teewe Brechtefeld (2016–2019), resigned
- James Taom (November 2019–2020)
- Tarakabu Tofinga (16 July 2020)

== See also ==
- Justice ministry
- Politics of Kiribati
