= Paulo Vanualailai =

I-Kiribati politician

Dr Paulo Vanualailai

Member of the House of Assembly
- In office 2012–2016
- Constituency: Rabi Island

Personal details
- Party: Pillars of Truth

Dr Paulo Vanualailai was a member of the Kiribati House of Assembly for the constituency of Rabi Island.
