= Tetaua Taitai =

I-Kiribati politician

Tetaua Taitai (c. 1947 – February 6, 2015) was an I-Kiribati physician, politician and businessman. He was originally from the atoll of Tabiteuea North, but resided in the neighboring Tabiteuea South in the southern part of Kiribati. Taitai was the brother-in-law of former Kiribati President Teburoro Tito.

Taitai served as the country's Secretary of Health during the 1980s and early 1990s. In 1994, newly elected president of Kiribati Teburoro Tito appointed Taitai as his Secretary of Cabinet.

In November 2011, Taitai was nominated as one of three candidates for president of Kiribati by the House of Assembly of Kiribati. However, Taitai lost the January 2012 presidential election to incumbent President Anote Tong, who was re-elected to a third term. Taitai placed second, behind Tong.

Tetaua Taitai continued to serve as the leader of the opposition until his death in 2015. He died from cancer on Friday, February 6, 2015, at the age of 67.
