= Ministry of Commerce, Industry and Cooperatives =

Government ministry of Kiribati

The Ministry of Commerce, Industry and Cooperatives (MCIC, in Gilbertese, Botaki ibukin Ioninibwai, Karaobwai ao Boboti) is a government ministry of Kiribati, headquartered in South Tarawa.

== Ministers ==
- Taomati Iuta (1979–1982) for Trade, Industry and Labour
- Ioteba Redfern (2003–2007)
- Taberannang Timeon (2007–2013)
- Tananei Marea (2016–2018)
- Atarake Nataara (2016–2020)
- Booti Nauan (2020–)
