= Tekeeua Tarati =

I-Kiribati politician

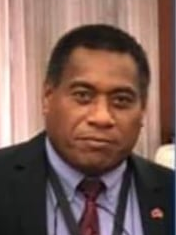

Member of the House of Assembly
- Incumbent
- Assumed office March 2019
- Preceded by: Matiota Kairo
- Constituency: Tamana

Ministry of Information, Communications, Transport and Tourism Development
- Incumbent
- Assumed office 11 July 2020
- Preceded by: Willie Tokataake

Personal details
- Born: 12 April 1971 (age 55) Tamana, Kiribati
- Party: Tobwaan Kiribati Party

Tekeeua Tarati (born 12 April 1971 in Tamana) is an I-Kiribati politician and entrepreneur, Minister for Information, Communications, Transport and Tourism development since July 2020.

Managing Director of Triple Tee Enterprises (TTT), between 2006 and 2018 he served the Kiribati Chamber of Commerce & Industry (KCCI) as Secretary, Vice-President and President (2012-2016), for maximum terms. When Matiota Kairo, the MP for Tamana, resigned in November 2018 for medical reasons, Tarati ran for by-election and was elected in March 2019 at the Maneaba ni Maungatabu. He joined the ruling Tobwaan Kiribati Party (TKP).

In 2020, he was re-elected with more than 86% of votes. He was then nominated as chairman of TKP until the presidential election of 22 June 2020. He was one of four MPs elected unopposed in 2024.
