= Matiota Kairo =

I-Kiribati politician

Member of the House of Assembly
- In office 2012–2018
- Succeeded by: Tekeeua Tarati
- Constituency: Tamana

Personal details
- Died: 2019 Tamana, Kiribati
- Party: Pillars of Truth

Matiota Kairo was a member of the Kiribati House of Assembly for the constituency of Tamana, until he resigned in 2018.
