= Ministry of Health and Medical Services (Solomon Islands) =

Coordinates: 9°26′12.5″S 159°58′7″E

Agency overview
- Jurisdiction: Government of Solomon Islands
- Headquarters: Honiara, Solomon Islands
- Minister responsible: Morris Toiraena, Minister of Health and Medical Services
- Agency executive: Pauline Boseto McNeil, Permanent Secretary of Health and Medical Services
- Website: https://solomons.gov.sb/ministry-of-health-medical-services/

The Ministry of Health and Medical Services (MHMS) is one of the ministries of the Solomon Islands Government.

The ministry delivers government services for health including developing the national health strategic plan. The ministry is also responsible for running national health programmes which monitor disease and provide public awareness.

== Organisation ==
MHMS consists of the following divisions:

- Central Headquarters and Administration
- National Eye Care Division
- Policy and Planning Division
- Internal Audit
- National Dental Program
- National Environmental Health Programme
- National Health Promotion
- National Health Training and Research
- National HIV / STI
- National Public Health Laboratory Program
- National Medical Imaging Services
- National Medical Store
- Social Welfare and Gender Base Violence
- Public Health Emergency and Surveillance
- Physiotherapy and Rehabilitation
- Nursing Council Board
- National Vector Borne Disease Control
- National TB / Leprosy Program
- National Reproductive and Child Health
- National Referral Hospital
- National Pharmacy Division
- National Nursing Administration
- Non-Communicable Disease Program
- National Mental Health
