= 2020 Kiribati presidential election =

First re-election of Taneti Maamau

- 22 June 2020
- Turnout: 79.67%
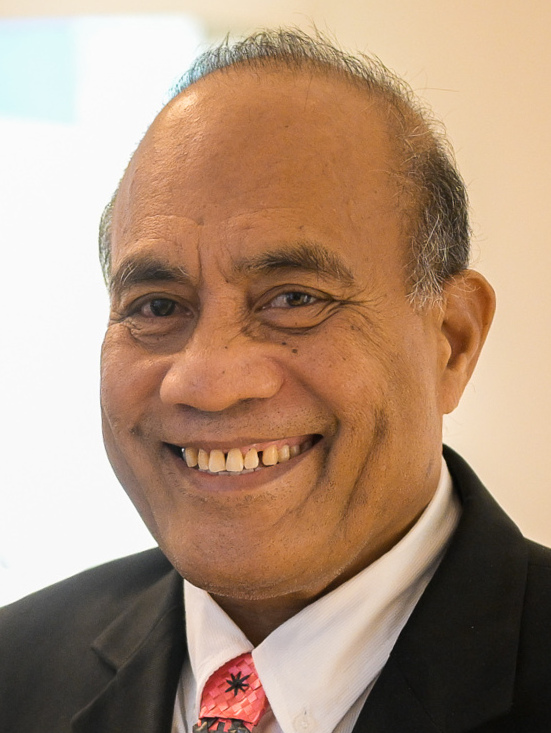

| Candidate | Taneti Maamau | Banuera Berina |
| Party | TKP | BKM |
| Popular vote | 26,053 | 17,866 |
| Percentage | 59.32% | 40.68% |
| Home Island | Onotoa | Kuria |
- Map of margin of victory by electoral district
President before election
Taneti Maamau
TKP
Elected President
Taneti Maamau
TKP

Presidential elections were held in Kiribati on 22 June 2020, following parliamentary elections in April. Incumbent President Taneti Maamau of the Tobwaan Kiribati Party was re-elected with 59% of the vote.

== Campaign ==
Relations with China and Taiwan were the main issue during the elections, with Maamau having switched Kiribati's recognition to China from Taiwan, while Berina seen as more sympathetic toward Taiwan. The elections were seen by many as a critical test for the Chinese Communist Party's expansionist foreign policy.

== Results ==
The results were declared on 23 June 2020 by Chief Justice John Muria at the Ministry of Justice headquarters in South Tarawa. Maamau won the election with 59% of the vote, receiving a majority in 16 of the 23 constituencies, while Berina finished first in seven constituencies.

| Candidate | Party | Votes | % |
|---|---|---|---|
| Taneti Maamau | Tobwaan Kiribati Party | 26,053 | 59.32 |
| Banuera Berina | Boutokaan Kiribati Moa Party | 17,866 | 40.68 |
| Total | | 43,919 | 100.00 |
| Valid votes | | 43,919 | 99.75 |
| Invalid/blank votes | | 112 | 0.25 |
| Total votes | | 44,031 | 100.00 |
| Registered voters/turnout | | 55,268 | 79.67 |
Source: Ministry of Justice

=== By electoral district ===
Vote share by electoral district
| Electoral district | Maamau | Berina |
|---|---|---|
| Abaiang | 1,372 | 1,030 |
| Abemama | 1,066 | 466 |
| Aranuka | 346 | 231 |
| Arorae | 71 | 420 |
| Banaba | 66 | 109 |
| Beru | 609 | 497 |
| Betio | 4,033 | 2,264 |
| Butaritari | 927 | 541 |
| Kiritimati | 1,706 | 1,473 |
| Kuria | 131 | 424 |
| Maiana | 95 | 849 |
| Makin | 404 | 483 |
| Marakei | 972 | 244 |
| Nikunau | 584 | 297 |
| Nonouti | 338 | 962 |
| North Tarawa | 1,846 | 1,006 |
| Onotoa | 811 | 20 |
| Tabiteuea North | 1,011 | 552 |
| Tabiteuea South | 465 | 201 |
| Tabuaeran | 168 | 621 |
| Tamana | 218 | 179 |
| TUC | 8,347 | 4,732 |
| Teraina | 4,65 | 265 |
| Total | 26,053 | 17,866 |
