= Kirata Temamaka =

I-Kiribati politician

Member of the House of Assembly
- In office 2012–2020
- Constituency: Kiritimati

Personal details
- Party: Pillars of Truth

Kirata Temamaka (modern spelling, Temwamwaka) was a member of the Kiribati House of Assembly for the constituency of Kiritimati.
