= Ministry of Health and Medical Services (Kiribati) =

Government ministry of Kiribati

The Ministry of Health and Medical Services (MHMS) (in Gilbertese, Botaki n Mwakuri ibukin te Mauri ao Katoki Aoraki) is a governmental ministry of Kiribati. It is partnered with the World Bank, Unicef, Australian Aid, UNFPA, and New Zealand Foreign Affairs and Trade.

== Ministers ==
- Tekarei Russell (1975–1977)
- Abete Merang (1979–1982) for Health and Community Affairs
- Natanaera Kirata (2003–2007)
- Dr Kautu Tenaua (2007–2016)
- Kobebe Taitai (2016–2018)
- Tauanei Marea (2018–2020)
- Dr Tinte Itinteang (2020–)
