= Tebao Awerika =

I-Kiribati politician

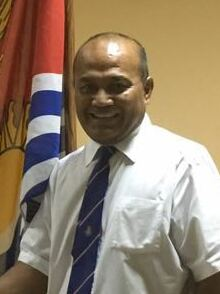

Minister of Environment, Lands, and Agriculture Development
- Incumbent
- Assumed office 2016
- Preceded by: Tiarite Kwong

Personal details
- Born: March 16 Tarawa, Kiribati

Tebao Awerika is a politician from Kiribati who served as Minister of Environment and Land in the Kiribati Government.

He was also the head of Kiribati National Olympic Committee when he worked as a civil servant.

== See also ==
- Politics of Kiribati
