= Taabeta Teakai =

Women government ministers of Kiribati

Taabeta Teakai is the Minister of Employment and Human Resources in Kiribati. She was the only female member of the government appointed in 2020.

== Political career ==
In the April 2020 elections Teakai was one of four women elected out of 45 members of Maneaba ni Maungatabu, the House of Assembly of Kiribati, the highest number of women represented in parliament until then. During the first round of voting in the South Tarawa constituency she polled second but was first after the second ballot. Three members were elected from this constituency. It was the first time Teakai had been elected.

As Minister of Employment and Human Resources, Teakai was sworn in on 2 July 2020. On that day she announced that she was setting a number of targets for completion within 100 days. On 10 October 2020, after 100 days, she announced that the ministry had successfully developed a Labour Market Database and an Overseas Employment Database. This is important for Kiribati, where many citizens work overseas, particularly in the shipping industry. Teakai also announced that steps had been taken to ensure compliance with the Occupational Health and Safety Act and the Employment and Industrial Relations Act. Finally, the ministry had developed a new logo.

The major problem faced by Teakai in her first year as a minister was the repatriation of seafarers from Kiribati, who were unable to return home because of COVID-19 and the decision of Kiribati to close its borders. With scheduled direct flights to only a few neighbouring countries, Kiribati was trying to arrange repatriation through countries without COVID. This became more complicated when there was an outbreak in Fiji and 165 seafarers were stuck in a hotel in Nadi, waiting to be allowed home.
