= Banuera Berina =

Kiribati lawyer

Personal details
- Born: 3 November 1962 (age 63) Beru
- Party: Maurin Kiribati Party (Before; 2013); Tobwaan Kiribati Party (2016–2019); Kiribati Moa (2019-2020); Boutokaan Kiribati Moa Party (2020-)
- Education: University of Otago

Banuera Berina (born 3 November 1962 in Beru) is a lawyer and a politician from Kiribati, representing Kuria in the House of Assembly. He was the opposition candidate in the 2020 Kiribati presidential election.

Berina was a private lawyer since 1992. In May 2003, Berina was first elected to Parliament for the district of South Tarawa and eventually rose to become the chairman of the ruling Tobwaan Kiribati Party. On 3 November 2019, after President Taneti Maamau of the party switched from a pro-Taiwan to a pro-China stance, he founded and became the Chairman of the Kiribati First Party along with 12 other MPs. He unsuccessfully ran as the single opposition candidate in the 2020 Kiribati presidential election, where he was supported by the Boutokaan Kiribati Moa Party, formed following the merger of his party and the Pillars of Truth Party.
