= Taneti Maamau =

President of Kiribati since 2016

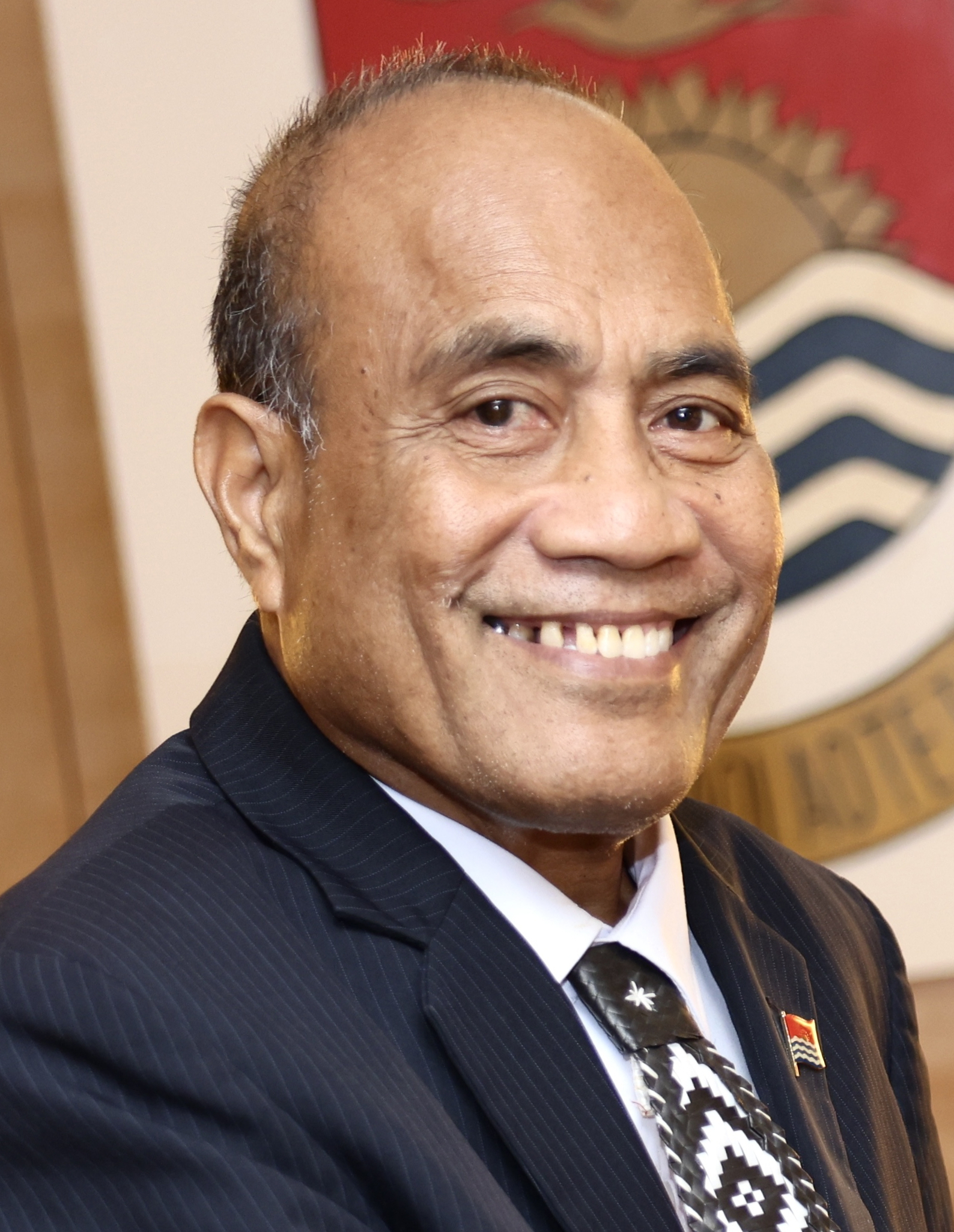
- Maamau in 2023

5th President of Kiribati
- Incumbent
- Assumed office 11 March 2016
- Vice President: Kourabi Nenem; Teuea Toatu
- Preceded by: Anote Tong

Personal details
- Born: 16 September 1960 (age 66) Onotoa, Gilbert and Ellice Islands
- Party: Tobwaan Kiribati Party
- Spouse: Teiraeng Tentoa Maamau (died 2025)
- Education: University of the South Pacific; University of Queensland

Taneti Maamau (born 16 September 1960) is an I-Kiribati politician who has served as the fifth president of Kiribati since 2016. A member of the Tobwaan Kiribati Party, his policies are targeted at strengthening Kiribati's weak economy and alleviating social issues. His government announced the Kiribati Vision for 20 Years (KV20), which plans to develop the tourism and fishing industries with aid from foreign investors.

Maamau's government stopped recognizing Taiwan in favour of closer ties with China, drawing concern from within his own party, the opposition and Western countries. He dismissed his predecessor's "Migration With Dignity" climate change policy. After his reelection in 2020, Maamau unveiled plans to combat rising sea levels by raising Kiribati's islands. This would be partly through dredging and supported by aid from foreign allies such as China. In 2022, Maamau's government was widely criticized for causing a constitutional crisis by suspending all superior court judges. He was re-elected in 2024 to serve a third and final term.

== Early life and career ==
Taneti Maamau was born on 16 September 1960. Hailing from Onotoa, Maamau attended the University of the South Pacific before taking a master's degree at the University of Queensland in Australia. In 2003, he completed his thesis on industrialization and trade policies in India.

In 1997, Maamau began public service as a Planning Officer with the Ministry of Finance and Economic Development. President Teburoro Tito made Maamau the ministry's permanent secretary in the mid-1990s, and Maamau went on to also be secretary of the Ministry of Commerce, Industry and Cooperatives.

In 2002, Maamau resigned from public service to join politics and won one of two seats for Onotoa in 2007. In 2011 and in 2015, he was re-elected a member of the Maneaba ni Maungatabu (parliament). Anote Tong served as president from 2003 to 2016. Maamau was part of the opposition.

After the 2015–16 parliamentary election, the United Coalition and Maurin Kiribati Parties combined to become the Tobwaan Kiribati Party. In February 2016, they endorsed Maamau as their candidate for the presidential election. He also received support from Tito. He won the election and was officially declared President after winning against the ruling party by nearly 60%. He was sworn in on 11 March 2016.

== Presidency ==
=== 2016–2020 ===
Maamau's policies target economic and social issues. In a legislative session in April, the government announced policy changes which extended free education to year 12. It established a committee to investigate corruption and abuse of power and gave a $1 million grant to the two major Christian churches.

Despite lack of sanitation, employment, and the rising cost of living in the capital of South Tarawa, many I-Kiribati from the outer islands migrate there. Maamau attempted to develop the coconut trade and manufacturing to reduce migration and poverty. In the same session, he doubled the copra subsidy, which ensures a guaranteed price for citizens selling copra to the government, from the $1 per kilo set by Tong. A journalist for Inside Climate News reported that consequently, on Abaiang, there is a smaller supply of coconuts. Copra cutters became fiercely competitive to the point of harvesting unripe crop. The subsidy accounted for 14% of the government's expected annual expenses.

Anote Tong's administration held the position that relocation was probably inevitable, due to climate change and rising sea levels. Tong spread awareness of the country's situation internationally. However, Maamau dismissed Tong's policy of "migration with dignity". Maamau does not deny climate change, but follows the common belief that only divine will could destroy Kiribati.

At COP23 in 2017, Maamau said that "my government has decided to put aside the misleading and pessimistic scenario of a sinking nation." He presented a video describing his Kiribati Vision for 20 Years (KV20), which includes investing in tourism and fisheries to remove Kiribati from poverty and raising land in Tarawa to build new homes. He also mentioned seeking foreign aid and investors to develop business and tourism, including the construction of resorts. No climate change adaptation actions were taken between 2017 and 2019, the year the government published the Kiribati Joint Implementation Plan for Climate Change and Disaster Risk Management (KJIP).

Matthieu Rytz, the filmmaker who made Anote's Ark, a documentary on climate change in Kiribati supported by Anote Tong, said that he was detained in January 2018 and his laptop was confiscated. Rytz also claimed that the government was deporting all foreign journalists following the Butiraoi ferry disaster, and was cracking down on media freedom.

In August 2018, Maamau was installed as the Chancellor of the University of the South Pacific.

In September 2019, Maamau switched Kiribati's recognition from Taiwan to China. As a result, thirteen MPs left his party to form their own Kiribati First Party, led by former chair Banuera Berina. Calling them "traitors", Maamau said he was surprised but respected their decision. Berina alleged that Maamau did not consult the MPs before making the switch.

Maamau allegedly said Taiwan repeatedly ignored his requests to contribute to KV20, including by buying Kiribati a $30 million Brazilian airliner. In March, Taiwanese Tsai Ing-wen failed to visit Kiribati while on an official tour of the region, which the government viewed as a snub. Berina said he split off after learning from Taiwanese sources that Tsai was actually enthusiastic but was told she could not visit because Maamau was in Fiji. The switch was criticized by the first president, Ieremia Tabai, and other opposition members, who organized pro-Taiwan protests in Tarawa.

=== 2020–2024 ===
On 6 January, Maamau signed a memorandum of understanding in China joining the Belt and Road Initiative. Xi Jinping, after meeting with Maamau, praised Kiribati's government for being "on the right side of history." In the 2020 parliamentary elections, Maamau's party also lost the parliamentary majority, winning only 20 seats. He ran for re-election in the 2020 presidential election against Berina. There were accusations of corruption by both sides. Berina promised to reverse the pro-China switch if elected. Taneti won the election by 59% of the vote and was officially sworn in for his second term on 24 June 2020.

In August, Maamau announced plans to elevate Kiribati's islands through dredging. He sought support from allies such as China for the projects, which he said would require billions of dollars, but said that he would maintain Kiribati's independence and not take out large loans from other countries. He also refuted American concerns that his government would allow a Chinese military base to be built on Kiritimati. Tong bought land in Fiji, which he stated I-Kiribati people could be moved to if rising sea levels rendered islands uninhabitable. There was speculation that Maamau would give or sell the estate to China. In February 2021, Maamau announced plans to develop it into a commercial farm, with China providing "technical assistance".

In October 2020, Maamau and four other Micronesian leaders threatened to withdraw their countries from the Pacific Islands Forum, which they felt did not support their interests. A Polynesian candidate had been elected Secretary-General instead of their preferred Micronesian nominee, which they felt breached a "gentleman's agreement" to cycle the position through the various regions. Maamau withdrew Kiribati from the forum in July 2022. It was seen as a setback to Pacific regionalism as China increased its influence in the region, fueling geopolitical tension. In 2023, Kiribati rejoined the forum.

In the 2022 Kiribati constitutional crisis, the government's treatment of judges was condemned by judicial bodies. In September 2022, Maamau indefinitely suspended Australian-born judge David Lambourne. The opposition saw this as a punishment for his wife, their leader Tessie Eria Lambourne. Maamau did the same of all three court of appeal judges and the chief justice after they ruled against Lambourne's deportation.

Kiribati had no COVID-19 cases for the first two years of the pandemic. On 22 January 2022, the government announced a lockdown after people on the first passenger flight in 10 months tested positive. It spread to Tarawa, where a freelance journalist, Rimon Rimon, told Time magazine that many were unhappy with the government for opening its borders while there was an outbreak in Fiji. Maamau's office implored citizens to get vaccinations. At the time, only 50% were fully vaccinated.

Maamau's government has backed deep sea mining, which puts it at odds with environmental groups.

In March 2024, Reuters reported that Chinese police were working alongside I-Kiribati officers as part of China's plans to form security ties with the Pacific Islands. This was a point of contention for countries such as Australia and the US, who were concerned that China was trying to increase extraterritorial control and surveillance.

=== 2024–present ===
Pro-China relations, climate policy, and cost of living were major issues in the 2024 elections. Maamau was re-elected for Onotoa in the parliamentary elections, and for a third and final term in the presidential election with 55% of the vote.

== Personal life ==
Maamau has served as a deacon of the Kiribati Uniting Church years before entering politics. He was married to Teiraeng Tentoa Maamau, a woman from Tabiteuea, with whom he had three children and two grandchildren. She died in November 2025.

Political offices
Preceded by Anote Tong	President of Kiribati; 2016–present	Incumbent
