= Boutokaan Kiribati Moa Party =

Kiribati political party

- Abbreviation: BKM
- Chairman: Tessie Eria Lambourne
- Founded: 22 May 2020
- Merger of: Kiribati First Party; Pillars of Truth
- Ideology: Progressivism; Feminism; Pro-Taiwan
- Colours: Navy blue
- House of Assembly: 8 / 45

Website
- Party Facebook

The Boutokaan Kiribati Moa Party (BKM) is a political party in Kiribati. The party was created as a merger of the Kiribati First Party and Boutokaan te Koaua in 2020. It is one of the two dominant parties in Kiribati, the other being the Tobwaan Kiribati Party.

== History ==
The party was established in May 2020, after the merger of the Pillars of Truth with the Kiribati First Party of Banuera Berina and twelve other MPs which left the Tobwaan Kiribati Party following the government's decision to cut diplomatic ties with Taiwan in favor of closer relations with China. On 22 May 2020, at the first meeting of the Maneaba ni Maungatabu, BKM nominated Banuera Berina as a candidate for the Beretitenti election.

Banuera was unsuccessful at the election, and the party shortly thereafter dissolved, with many of the members going on to form the Kamanoan Kiribati Party in August 2020.
