= 2015–16 Kiribati parliamentary election =

- 30 December 2015 (first round); 7 January 2016 (second round)

44 of the 46 seats in the House of Assembly
	First party	Second party
Party	PTK	KTK–MKP
Seats after	26	18
Seat change	▲11	▲5
Speaker before election
Taomati Iuta
National Progressive Party
Speaker after election
Teatao Teannaki
Pillars of Truth

Parliamentary elections were held in Kiribati on 30 December 2015, with a second round of voting for 25 seats on 7 January 2016. The result was a victory for the Pillars of Truth party, which won 26 of the 46 seats.

== Electoral system ==
The 46 member of the House of Assembly are elected by three methods; 44 are elected in 23 single- and multi-member constituencies using a modified two-round system. Voters had as many votes to cast as the number of seats in their constituencies, and a candidate was elected in the first round if they received more than 50% of the ballots cast. Where not all seats were filled, a second round was held with the number of candidates being equal to the number of remaining seats plus two. A tie in the second round would have resulted in a third round of voting. The other two members of the House consisted of one seat elected by the Rabi Council of Leaders, and the Attorney General, as an ex-officio member until the Change of Constitution in October 2016. The Speaker elected after the elections from outside the House of Assembly, is not an MP.

== Results ==
Of the 44 seats, 19 were won in the first round and 25 went to a run-off. In the first round, incumbent minister Tom Murdoch lost his seat. In the run-off, Labour Minister Martin Moreti and Environment Minister Tiarite Kwong lost their seats. Former President Teatao Teannaki also lost his seat on Abaiang. However, former presidents Ieremia Tabai and Teburoro Tito retained their seats.

On Onotoa, Kouraiti Beniato retained his seat, while on Maiana new MPs David Collins and Kaure Baabo were elected; In North Tarawa, two new MPs, Atarake Natara and Emile Schutz, were elected, while Nabuti Mwemwenikarawa, former leader of Maurin Kiribati and candidate for president, lost; on Kiritimati, Kirata Temwamwaka and Jacob Teem were elected; while Uriam Iabeta won her Teraina seat in the Line Islands.

Party	Seats	+/–
Pillars of Truth	26	+11
United Coalition Party	18	–
Maurin Kiribati Party	18	–
Appointed members	2	0
Total	46	0
Source: Adam Carr, IPU, Radio Kiribati

=== By constituency ===
Constituency	Candidate	First round		Second round	
Constituency	Candidate	Votes	%	Votes	%
Abaiang	Kautu Tenaua	1,129	23.78		
Abaiang	Teuea Toatu	936	19.71	882	25.14
Abaiang	Teatao Teannaki	916	19.29	858	24.46
Abaiang	Tekena Tiroa	711	14.97	949	27.05
Abaiang	Tetaake Kwong	662	13.94	819	23.35
Abaiang	Bwenata Baukin	194	4.09		
Abaiang	Tooma Moote	117	2.46		
Abaiang	Uakerita Kanoanie	83	1.75		
Abemama	Natan Teewe	789	35.57		
Abemama	Willie Tokataake	671	30.25	596	43.76
Abemama	Tiarite Kwong	405	18.26	513	37.67
Abemama	Bonoue Tabaka	204	9.20	253	18.58
Abemama	Kabuaua Uatao	109	4.91		
Abemama	Kaewaniti Rutio	40	1.80		
Aranuka	Martin Moreti	232	39.66	226	38.11
Aranuka	Tianeti Ioane	179	30.60	239	40.30
Aranuka	Riteti Maninraka	151	25.81	128	21.59
Aranuka	Rine Ueara	14	2.39		
Aranuka	Bweniita Bename	9	1.54		
Arorae	Teima Onorio	431	92.29		
Arorae	Taing Ataia	36	7.71		
Banaba	Tibanga Taratai	171	56.44		
Banaba	Waqa Kirite	132	43.56		
Beru	England Iuta	458	23.88	574	33.22
Beru	Tetabo Nakara	408	21.27	438	25.35
Beru	Batoromaio Kiritian	366	19.08	398	23.03
Beru	Mantaia Kaongotao	212	11.05	318	18.40
Beru	Tanua Pine	191	9.96		
Beru	Kirabuke Teiaua	172	8.97		
Beru	Miika Aram	111	5.79		
Betio (BTC)	Tangariki Reete	2,108	19.95	2,326	24.07
Betio (BTC)	Tebao Awerika	1,948	18.44	2,190	22.67
Betio (BTC)	Ioteba Redfern	1,500	14.20	2,076	21.49
Betio (BTC)	Martin Tofinga	1,320	12.49	1,704	17.64
Betio (BTC)	Romano Reo	1,200	11.36	1,366	14.14
Betio (BTC)	Meaua Betiota	947	8.96		
Betio (BTC)	Teurakai Ukenio	511	4.84		
Betio (BTC)	Babera Taobura	481	4.55		
Betio (BTC)	Kianteata Teabo	440	4.16		
Betio (BTC)	Taua Eritai	69	0.65		
Betio (BTC)	Mautaake Tannang	42	0.40		
Butaritari	Alexanda Teabo	1,185	44.04		
Butaritari	Tinian Reiher	1,090	40.51		
Butaritari	Tikau Tamaere	416	15.46		
Kiritimati	Mikarite Temari	1,551	25.91		
Kiritimati	Kirata Temwamwaka	1,295	21.63	1,648	36.39
Kiritimati	Jacob Teem	1,003	16.76	1,507	33.27
Kiritimati	Tawita Temoku	554	9.25	727	16.05
Kiritimati	Wiriki Tooma	289	4.83	647	14.29
Kiritimati	Katevea Taoaba	283	4.73		
Kiritimati	Kiang Shiu	275	4.59		
Kiritimati	Tarere Ataia	222	3.71		
Kiritimati	Naboreon Reo	126	2.10		
Kiritimati	Timan Kaiteie	118	1.97		
Kiritimati	Anami Raiati	110	1.84		
Kiritimati	Tureta Baniera	85	1.42		
Kiritimati	Teekua Tooma	75	1.25		
Kuria	Banuera Berina	415	50.67		
Kuria	Tom Murdoch	385	47.01		
Kuria	Matang Tekitanga	19	2.32		
Maiana	David Collins	468	24.59	[data missing]	
Maiana	Kaure Baabo	425	22.33	[data missing]	
Maiana	Tioera Baitika	313	16.45	[data missing]	
Maiana	Miire Raieta	248	13.03	[data missing]	
Maiana	Vincent Tong	224	11.77		
Maiana	Aukitino Ioane	190	9.98		
Maiana	Torote Kauongo	35	1.84		
Makin	James Taom	744	44.23		
Makin	Pinto Katia	646	38.41		
Makin	Baraniko Ibeata	204	12.13		
Makin	Karea Baireti	88	5.23		
Marakei	Iotebwa Tebau	672	29.17		
Marakei	Ruateki Tekaiara	378	16.41	470	35.63
Marakei	Patrick Tatireta	359	15.58	445	33.74
Marakei	Temate Ereateiti	345	14.97	404	30.63
Marakei	Kamatie Kautu	214	9.29		
Marakei	Rutiano Benetito	194	8.42		
Marakei	Dephew Kanono	131	5.69		
Marakei	Kantera Tebwebwe	11	0.48		
Nikunau	Tauanei Marea	479	30.39		
Nikunau	Rimeta Beniamina	468	29.70		
Nikunau	Ngutu Awira	319	20.24		
Nikunau	Tabokai Kiritome	121	7.68		
Nikunau	Moote Terukaio	117	7.42		
Nikunau	Rakeiti Mackenzie	72	4.57		
Nonouti	Ieremia Tabai	588	30.88	611	32.60
Nonouti	Waysang Kumkee	582	30.57	628	33.51
Nonouti	Karuaki Matia	361	18.96	415	22.15
Nonouti	Toromoa Katua	194	10.19	220	11.74
Nonouti	Kunei Maaka Etekiera	179	9.40		
North Tarawa (ETC)	Boutu Bateriki	1,181	23.72	1,318	27.28
North Tarawa (ETC)	Nabuti Mwemwenikarawa	865	17.38	775	16.04
North Tarawa (ETC)	Emile Schutz	851	17.10	1,020	21.11
North Tarawa (ETC)	Atarake Nataara	774	15.55	1,012	20.94
North Tarawa (ETC)	Baraam Tetaeka	679	13.64	707	14.63
North Tarawa (ETC)	Inatio Tanentoa	562	11.29		
North Tarawa (ETC)	Henry Kaake	66	1.33		
Onotoa	Taaneti Mamau	642	46.69		
Onotoa	Kouraiti Beniato	347	25.24	399	52.36
Onotoa	Baranite Kirata	296	21.53	312	40.94
Onotoa	Tetokiraa Kimereti	90	6.55	51	6.69
South Tarawa (TUC)	Teburoro Tito	4,033	20.51	4,520	23.78
South Tarawa (TUC)	Shiu Fung Kam-Ho	3,495	17.77	4,553	23.95
South Tarawa (TUC)	Kourabi Nenem	3,281	16.68	4,254	22.38
South Tarawa (TUC)	Arobati Teewe	3,167	16.10	3,798	19.98
South Tarawa (TUC)	Maere Tekanene	1,752	8.91	1,885	9.92
South Tarawa (TUC)	Teweiariki Teaero	881	4.48		
South Tarawa (TUC)	Bantarawa Ietimeta	646	3.28		
South Tarawa (TUC)	Tiiroa Roneti	612	3.11		
South Tarawa (TUC)	Maria Kaiboia	553	2.81		
South Tarawa (TUC)	Teramweai Itinraoi	462	2.35		
South Tarawa (TUC)	Mareko Tofinga	434	2.21		
South Tarawa (TUC)	Rabaere Matai	266	1.35		
South Tarawa (TUC)	Paul Tatireta	85	0.43		
Tabiteuea North	Taberannang Timeon	1,092	44.48		
Tabiteuea North	Kobebe Taitai	973	39.63		
Tabiteuea North	Takaria Ubwaitoi	390	15.89		
Tabiteuea South	Titabu Tabane	437	55.74		
Tabiteuea South	Tebuai Uaai	347	44.26		
Tabuaeran	Tekiau Aretateta	735	41.27		
Tabuaeran	Tewaaki Kobwae	351	19.71	342	37.09
Tabuaeran	Tetan Mweretaka	254	14.26	330	35.79
Tabuaeran	Bauro Kaneti	190	10.67	250	27.11
Tabuaeran	Tyrone Orme	172	9.66		
Tabuaeran	Kokoria Arioka	79	4.44		
Tamana	Matiota Kairo	300	68.81		
Tamana	Eriati Kauongo	103	23.62		
Tamana	Rooti Terubea	33	7.57		
Teraina	Uriam Iabeta	352	43.95	[data missing]	
Teraina	Rereao Tetaake	263	32.83	[data missing]	
Teraina	Johnny Moote	159	19.85	[data missing]	
Teraina	Taam Anre	16	2.00		
Teraina	Erekannang Terakau	11	1.37		

== See also ==
- List of members of the 11th Parliament of Kiribati
