= Kiribati First Party =

Kiribati political party

Kiribati First Party Kiribati Moa Party
- Abbreviation: KMP
- Leader: Banuera Berina
- Founded: 4 November 2019
- Dissolved: 22 May 2020
- Split from: Tobwaan Kiribati
- Merged into: Boutokaan Kiribati Moa Party

Website
- Facebook page

The Kiribati First Party (Gilbertese: Kiribati Moa Party; KMP) was a political party in Kiribati until it merged with Pillars of Truth to create the Boutokaan Kiribati Moa Party in 2020.

== History ==
The party was established in November 2019 after Banuera Berina and twelve other MPs left the Tobwaan Kiribati Party following the government's decision to cut diplomatic ties with Taiwan in favor of closer relations with China.
