= United Coalition Party =

United Coalition Party Karikirakean Te I-Kiribati
- Founded: August 2010
- Dissolved: January 2016
- Merger of: Kiribati Independent Party; Protect the Maneaba
- Merged into: Tobwaan Kiribati Party

The United Coalition Party, also known as the Improving I-Kiribati Welfare Party (Gilbertese: Karikirakean Te I-Kiribati; KTK), was a political party in Kiribati.

== History ==
The party was established in August 2010 as a merger of the Kiribati Independent Party and Protect the Maneaba. The new party held 12 seats, making it the largest opposition faction. This resulted in its leader Rimeta Beniamina being appointed Leader of the Opposition. However, he later defected to the Maurin Kiribati Party (MKP).

In the 2011 parliamentary elections the party won ten seats. As a result it was able to nominate Tetaua Taitai for the 2012 presidential elections. Taitai finished second with 35% of the vote.

In January 2016 it merged with the MKP to form the Tobwaan Kiribati Party.
