= Maurin Kiribati Party =

Protect Kiribati Party Maurin Kiribati Pati
- Leader: Rimeta Beniamina
- Dissolved: 29 January 2016
- Merged into: Tobwaan Kiribati Party

The Maurin Kiribati Party (Protect Kiribati Party) was a political party in Kiribati. At the presidential elections of 4 July 2003, its candidate Banuera Berina won 9.1%.

On 29 January 2016, it merged with Teburoro Tito's United Coalition Party to form the Tobwaan Kiribati Party.
