= Tobwaan Kiribati Party =

- English name: Embracing Kiribati Party
- Abbreviation: TKP
- Leader: Taneti Maamau
- Chairman: Betero Atanibora
- Founded: 29 January 2016
- Merger of: Maurin Kiribati Party; United Coalition Party
- House of Assembly: 33 / 45

The Tobwaan Kiribati Party (English: Embracing Kiribati Party, TKP) is a political party in Kiribati. It is one of the two dominant parties in Kiribati, the other being the Boutokaan Kiribati Moa Party.

== History ==
The party was established in January 2016 as a merger of the Maurin Kiribati Party and the United Coalition Party. The two parties had won 19 of the 44 elected seats in the House of Assembly in the 2015–16 parliamentary elections, with party member Teatao Teannaki subsequently elected to the Assembly as Speaker of the House of Assembly. It nominated Taneti Mamau as its candidate for the 2016 presidential elections, which Mamau won with around 60% of the vote.

In November 2019, after the switch of diplomatic relations from Taiwan to China, its chairman Banuera Berina founded an opposition party, the Kiribati Moa Party, with 13 MPs. In the April 2020 parliamentary elections the party won 22 of the 44 elected seats in the House of Assembly. The presidential elections in June 2020 saw Maamau re-elected with 59% of the vote. Maamu was re-elected again in the 2024 presidential elections with 54% of the vote.
