= House of Assembly (Kiribati) =

Unicameral legislature of Kiribati

Coordinates: 1°21′01″N 173°02′20″E

House of Assembly Maneaba ni Maungatabu
- 13th Kiribati Parliament

Type
- Type: Unicameral

History
- Founded: 12 July 1979; 1 May 1974 (as House of Assembly of the Gilbert and Ellice Islands); 1 January 1976 (as House of Assembly of the Gilbert Islands)

Leadership
- Speaker: Willie Tokataake, TKP since 13 September 2024
- Deputy Speaker: Ruta Teretia Babo, TKP since 13 September 2024
- Leader of the Opposition: Tessie Eria Lambourne, BKM since 22 June 2020

Structure
- Seats: 45 members (44 elected + 1 nominated member)
- Political groups: Government (33) Tobwaan Kiribati (33) Opposition (8) Boutokaan Kiribati Moa (8) Independents (4) Independents (4)
- Length of term: 4 years

Elections
- Voting system: Plurality voting modified by two-round system
- Last election: 14 and 19 August 2024
- Next election: By 2028

Meeting place
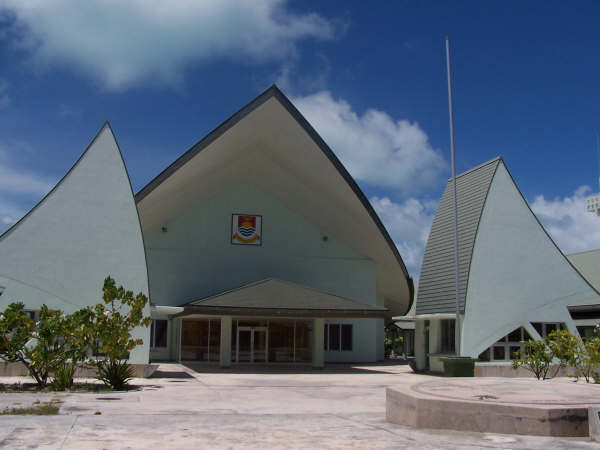
- Ambo, South Tarawa

Website
- www.parliament.gov.ki

The House of Assembly (Gilbertese: Maneaba ni Maungatabu, lit. 'Maneaba of the Sacred Mountain') is the sole chamber of the Parliament of Kiribati. Since 2016, it has 45 members, 44 elected for a four-year term in 23 single-seat and multi-seat constituencies and 1 non-elected delegate from the Banaban community on Rabi Island in Fiji. From 1979 to 2016, the Attorney general was an ex officio member of the legislature until a change of the constitution modified this provision.

Created by the Constitution of 12 July 1979, in a Westminster system, its seat has been at Ambo in South Tarawa since October 2000. From 1979 to 2000, it was at Bairiki, where the House of Assembly was created in 1974, on the base of the Legislative Council of the British colony, created in 1970, and a previous House of Representatives of 1967 in the Gilbert and Ellice Islands.

== History ==
=== Gilbert and Ellice Islands Colony ===
With decolonisation, starting with a Colony conference in 1956, the Gilbert and Ellice Islands initiated to organise a first form of Parliamentary system which began in 1963—1964 with an Advisory Council, including 5 elected members and 12 ex officio members. This council was replaced by a House of Representatives in 1967, with 23 members, and then by a Legislative Council in 1970, with less ex officio members. An order in council of 1970 created this Legislative Council of 28 elected members, replacing the former House of Representatives of the colony. This Council was elected only in 1971. A new constitution entered into effect on 1 May 1974, creating a House of Assembly of 28 members from the previous Legislative Council of the Gilbert and Ellice Islands colony (1970). The 8 members of the Ellice Islands created an Ellice committee and, after referendum, left the House of Assembly on 1 January 1976 to become the Fale i Fono on Funafuti, the new capital of Tuvalu.

=== Gilbert Islands Colony and Independent Kiribati ===
The first specific to Gilbert Islands House of Assembly was so created on 1 January 1976, just after the separation with the Ellice Islands, decided on 1 October 1975, to prepare the following independence of Kiribati and the Constitution of 12 July 1979. The former House of Assembly took its new constitutional name of Maneaba ni Maungatabu on 12 July 1979. The House of Assembly continued until independence when it became the Maneaba ni Maungatabu with 35 elected members, one nominated member (chosen by the Rabi Council of Leaders) and one ex-officio member (the Attorney-General). The total number of elected members has, at the 2007 elections, increased to 44 making a 46 member unicameral parliament. In 2016, a modified constitution had suppressed the Ex-officio member with the creation of a new Ministry of Justice.

Three women have been elected to the House of Assembly; Tekarei Russell in 1974, Fenua Tamuera in 1990 and Koriri Tenieu in 2012.

== Speaker ==
The Maneaba has a Speaker, elected by its members from outside Parliament, per section 71 of the Constitution.

At the first parliamentary session following a general election, the Chief Justice presides over the Maneaba to take nominations for the office of Speaker. Voting is done by secret ballot, and a candidate must receive an absolute majority of votes cast to be elected. Should more than two candidates be nominated, the candidate with the lowest number of votes is eliminated after each round of voting until one candidate wins.

The Speaker of the Maneaba does not have a vote on any matter. Should a vote result in a tie, the Speaker has to declare it as rejected.

Following the dissolution of the legislature before elections, the Speaker remains in office. On the first day of a new session, the Speaker leaves office. The Maneaba may also pass a no-confidence vote against the Speaker to remove him from office.

Along with the Chief Justice and Chairman of the Public Service Commission, the Speaker serves as a member of the Council of State, formed to continue carrying out the duties of government following a no-confidence vote against the President or Government.

== Logo ==
On 26 October 2020, the Maneaba ni Maungatabu adopted a new logo.

== See also ==
- Politics of Kiribati
- List of legislatures by country
