= 9th Parliament of Kiribati =

The 9th Parliament of Kiribati is the current term of the House of Assembly of Kiribati. It was determined by the 2007 parliamentary election.

The 9th Parliament consists in 44 representatives, elected from 23 single-seat or multi-seat constituencies.

The parliamentary website notes that, although political parties exist, they are "loose groupings rather than disciplined blocks, with little or no structure. Members may change allegiance on a number of occasions during their tenure. It is also common for members to vote according to the special interests of their electorate on certain issues". Consequently, representatives' party membership is not listed on the parliamentary website.

== Members ==
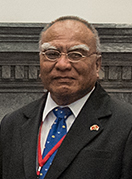
Tebuai Uaai

Below are the current 2016-2020, 45 Members of the Maneaba ni Maungatabu (MM)

	MM	Constituency	Party
1	Hon. James Taom	Makin	Tobwaan Kiribati Party (TKP)
2	Hon. Pinto Katia	Makin	Boutokan Te Koaua (BTK)
3	Hon. Alexander Teabo	Butaritari	TKP
4	Hon. Tinian Reiher	Butaritari	Independent
5	Hon. Ruateki Tekaiara	Marakei	TKP
6	Hon. Ioteba Tebau	Marakei	TKP
7	Hon. Dr. Teuea Toatu	Abaiang	TKP
8	Hon. Tekena Tiroa	Abaiang	TKP
9	Hon. Dr. Kautu Tenaua	Abaiang	BTK
10	Hon. Atarake Nataara	North Tarawa	TKP
11	Hon. Emil Shutz	North Tarawa	TKP
12	Hon. Boutu Bateriki	North Tarawa	BTK
13	Hon. Kourabi Nenem	South Tarawa	TKP
14	Hon. Taoaba Kaiea	South Tarawa	TKP
15	Hon. Shiu-Fung Jong	South Tarawa	BTK
16	Hon. Ioteba Redfern	Betio	TKP
17	Hon. Tebao Awerika	Betio	TKP
18	Hon. Tangariki Reete	Betio	BTK
19	Hon. David Collins	Maiana	TKP
20	Hon. Kaure Baabo	Maiana	BTK
21	Hon. Banuera Berina	Kuria	TKP
22	Hon. Tianeti Ioane	Aranuka	TKP
23	Hon. Willie Tokataake	Abemama	TKP
24	Hon. Natan Teewe	Abemama	TKP
25	Hon. Bonteman Tabera	Nonouti	TKP
26	Hon. Sir Ieremia Tabai	Nonouti	BTK
27	Hon. Kobebe Taitai	Tab North	TKP
28	Hon. Taberannang Timeon	Tab North	BTK
29	Hon. Titabu Taabane	Tab South	BTK
30	Hon. Taneti Maamau	Onotoa	TKP
31	Hon. Kouraiti Beniato	Onotoa	TKP
32	Hon. Tetabo Nakara	Beru	TKP
33	Hon. Engiran Iuta	Beru	BTK
34	Hon. Tauanei Marea	Nikunau	TKP
35	Hon. Rimeta Beniamina	Nikunau	BTK
36	Hon. Tekeeua Tarati	Tamana	TKP
37	Hon. Teima Onorio	Arorae	BTK
38	Hon. Tibanga Taratai	Banaba	TKP
39	Hon. Uriam Tirae	Teraina	TKP
40	Hon. Tekiau Aretateta	Tabuaeran	Independent
41	Hon. Tewaki Kobae	Tabuaeran	Independent
42	Hon. Mikarite Temari	Kiritimati & Kanton	TKP
43	Hon. Jacob Teem	Kiritimati & Kanton	TKP
44	Hon. Kirata Temamaka	Kiritimati & Kanton	BTK
45	Hon. David Christopher	Rabi Representative	TKP

The following are the previous years' 44 members of the National Parliament.

MP	Constituency
James Taom	Makin
Kouramaere Kautoa	Makin
Alexander Teabo	Butaritari
Toakai Koririntetaake	Butaritari
Patrick Tatireta	Marakei
Temate Ereateiti	Marakei
Teatao Teannaki	Abaiang
Bauro Tongaai	Abaiang
Kautu Tenaua	Abaiang
Nabuti Mwemwenikarawa	North Tarawa
Inatio Tanentoa	North Tarawa
Bauro Tenano	North Tarawa
Teburoro Tito	South Tarawa
Harry Tong	South Tarawa
Banuera Berina	South Tarawa
Ioteba Redfern	Betio
Tangariki Reete	Betio
Tonganibeia Taam	Betio
Anote Tong	Maiana
Teiwaki Areieta	Maiana
Matang Tekitanga	Kuria
Amberoti Nikora	Aranuka
Natan Teewe	Abemama
Willie Tokataake	Abemama
Ieremia Tabai	Nonouti
Kunei Etekiera	Nonouti
Tetaua Taitai	Tabiteuea North
Taberannang Timeon	Tabiteuea North
Tebuai Uaai	Tabiteuea South
Taneti Mamau	Onotoa
Kouraiti Beniato	Onotoa
Tetabo Nakara	Beru
Kirabuke Teiaaua	Beru
Rimeta Beniamina	Nikunau
Mote Terukaio	Nikunau
Teima Onorio	Arorae
Tawita Temoku	Kiritimati
Jacob Teem	Kiritimati
Mikaere Baraniko	Kiritimati
Tekiau Aretaateta	Tabuaeran
Teetan Mweretaka	Tabuaeran
Rereao Tetaake Eria	Teraina
Timon Aneri	Banaba
Teatu Moutu Kaibuariki	Rabi
