= 2002 Kiribati parliamentary election =

Parliamentary elections were held in Kiribati on 29 November 2002, with a second round on 8 December. The result was a victory for the new Pillars of Truth party, which won 17 of the 40 seats in the House of Assembly. Fourteen MPs, including seven cabinet ministers, lost their seats in the election.

== Campaign ==
A total of 176 candidates contested the election, with over half running under the banner of the ruling Protect the Maneaba party.

A bitter election campaign included opposition leader Harry Tong accusing the government of attempting to prevent him using the national coat of arms on his campaign material, which also claiming that Chinese government officials were attempting to bribe candidates. In response, the ruling party accused the opposition of siding with Taiwan.

== Results ==
Party	Seats	+/–
Pillars of Truth	17	New
Protect the Maneaba	7	–7
Independents	16	+1
Total	40	0
Source: Adam Carr, IPU

=== By constituency ===
Constituency	Candidate	First round		Second round	
Constituency	Candidate	Votes	%	Votes	%
Abaiang	Emile Uri Shutz	[data missing]			
Abaiang	Teatao Teannaki	[data missing]		937	28.67
Abaiang	Bauro Tongaai	[data missing]		902	27.60
Abaiang	Kautu Tenaaua	[data missing]		822	25.15
Abaiang	Uakerita Kanoanie	[data missing]		607	18.57
Abaiang	Nabura Nikuata	[data missing]			
Abaiang	Rabeka T. Rikameta	[data missing]			
Abaiang	Ratinta Moote	[data missing]			
Abaiang	Nauto Tekai	[data missing]			
Abaiang	Atanibora Tataua	[data missing]			
Abemama	Natan Teewe	661	31.09		
Abemama	Willie Tokataake	607	28.55	527	47.74
Abemama	Baitongo Taburimai	416	19.57	266	24.09
Abemama	Kabure Temariti	266	12.51	311	28.17
Abemama	Amwatia Maerietoa	176	8.28		
Aranuka	Amberoti Nikora	240	61.54		
Aranuka	Tekabang Ratintera	150	38.46		
Arorae	Teima Onorio	257	38.88	293	48.67
Arorae	Itaea Riteri	190	28.74	179	29.73
Arorae	Uria Mataio	109	16.49	130	21.59
Arorae	Ruewita Iotin	88	13.31		
Arorae	Tebwatoki Tawetia	17	2.57		
Banaba	Timon A. Aneri	82	50.62		
Banaba	Kakiaterara Bauretia	30	18.52		
Banaba	Nenem Kourabi	27	16.67		
Banaba	Aberaam Tewai	23	14.20		
Beru	Tetabo Nakara	595	33.02		
Beru	Kirabuke Teiaua	230	12.76	325	32.66
Beru	Biribo Neemia	225	12.49	401	40.30
Beru	Tewareka Borau	208	11.54	269	27.04
Beru	Tokintekai Uereti	188	10.43		
Beru	Tiraim Aaram	159	8.82		
Beru	Arobete Iuta	155	8.60		
Beru	Katiotio Reirei	22	1.22		
Beru	Rameka Barao	20	1.11		
Betio (BTC)	Tamwi Naotarai	1,879	24.43	2,247	31.18
Betio (BTC)	Reete Bokai	1,255	16.32	2,023	28.07
Betio (BTC)	Teiraoi Tetabea	1,044	13.58	1,416	19.65
Betio (BTC)	Tonganibeia Taam	800	10.40	1,521	21.10
Betio (BTC)	Mere T Rivata	610	7.93		
Betio (BTC)	Baikia Airam	577	7.50		
Betio (BTC)	Harry Redfern	369	4.80		
Betio (BTC)	Teaki Kanoanie	336	4.37		
Betio (BTC)	Raoranti J Muller	240	3.12		
Betio (BTC)	Ngutu Awira	229	2.98		
Betio (BTC)	Atanimarewe Atintoa	163	2.12		
Betio (BTC)	Kantara Baurerei	117	1.52		
Betio (BTC)	Itinteang Tenano	71	0.92		
Butaritari	Uera Rabaua	745	27.85		
Butaritari	Tinian Relher	511	19.10	635	44.34
Butaritari	Tiim Taekiti	499	18.65	377	26.33
Butaritari	Toakai Koririntetaake	494	18.47	420	29.33
Butaritari	Alexander Teabo	279	10.43		
Butaritari	Fenua Mareweia	147	5.50		
Kiritimati	Taunga Smith	618	17.94	951	28.46
Kiritimati	Tawita Temoku	489	14.20	929	27.80
Kiritimati	Teambo Keariki	462	13.41	652	19.51
Kiritimati	Jacob Teem	459	13.33	810	24.24
Kiritimati	Itua Binataake	346	10.05		
Kiritimati	Bunatao Arioka	218	6.33		
Kiritimati	Tekinaiti Kaiteie	146	4.24		
Kiritimati	Aneri Ari	118	3.43		
Kiritimati	Rutio Bangao	116	3.37		
Kiritimati	Rereao Tebau	105	3.05		
Kiritimati	Temari Manoa	87	2.53		
Kiritimati	Tiaon Noteabu	75	2.18		
Kiritimati	Etekia Kunei	74	2.15		
Kiritimati	Teoro Teatea	37	1.07		
Kiritimati	Moiaua Toariri	29	0.84		
Kiritimati	Kamatua Bukaireiti	25	0.73		
Kiritimati	Martin M Boutu	24	0.70		
Kiritimati	Uriam Williams	16	0.46		
Kuria	Baraniko Moa	233	44.21	235	37.01
Kuria	Bakeua Tekita	201	38.14	253	39.84
Kuria	Karotu Teimarawa	88	16.70	147	23.15
Kuria	Nawaia Tekeea	5	0.95		
Maiana	Anote Tong	591	31.09		
Maiana	Rotite Uriam	453	23.83	382	36.59
Maiana	Moteti Kakoroa	412	21.67	361	34.58
Maiana	Teiwaki Areieta	357	18.78	301	28.83
Maiana	Tabia Kabaua	88	4.63		
Makin	James Taom	288	37.16	342	44.88
Makin	Kouramaere Kautoa	194	25.03	231	30.31
Makin	Marouea Kamraratu	140	18.06	189	24.80
Makin	Kiatamoa Kaitara	70	9.03		
Makin	Mwamwau Taake	56	7.23		
Makin	Kauaba Ibutuna	27	3.48		
Marakei	Temate Ereateti	375	20.12	440	25.64
Marakei	Rutiano Benetito	353	18.94	484	28.21
Marakei	Manraoi Kaiea	315	16.90	391	22.79
Marakei	Patrick J Tatireta	313	16.79	401	23.37
Marakei	Ataraoti Bwebwenibure	275	14.75		
Marakei	Tam'atau Baraam	128	6.87		
Marakei	Anetoka Babetara	105	5.63		
Nikunau	Rimeta Beniamina	477	34.44		
Nikunau	Teweia Awira	217	15.67	308	39.19
Nikunau	Ioane Tokintekai	208	15.02	232	29.52
Nikunau	Kaaneang Betero	120	8.66	246	31.30
Nikunau	Temaro Bamatoa	101	7.29		
Nikunau	Mikaio Rorobuaka	101	7.29		
Nikunau	Tewake Taniara	77	5.56		
Nikunau	Tieon Kaeba	60	4.33		
Nikunau	Timwa Teimakin	24	1.73		
Nonouti	Ieremia Tabai	592	31.67		
Nonouti	Waysang Kum Kee	465	24.88	488	43.30
Nonouti	Ata Etekia	413	22.10	176	15.62
Nonouti	Katua Tabunga	170	9.10	463	41.08
Nonouti	Kunei Etekiera	120	6.42		
Nonouti	Bitamoana Bureneita	92	4.92		
Nonouti	Teetu Teinai	17	0.91		
North Tarawa (ETC)	Katotika Tekee	915	30.21		
North Tarawa (ETC)	Bauro Tenano	688	22.71	681	42.70
North Tarawa (ETC)	Katarake Tebweao	565	18.65	394	24.70
North Tarawa (ETC)	Nabuti Mwemwenikarawa	474	15.65	520	32.60
North Tarawa (ETC)	Bwateriki Bwaree	349	11.52		
North Tarawa (ETC)	Namwanoku Tekanene	38	1.25		
Onotoa	Natanaera Kirata	394	29.08		
Onotoa	Beta Tentoa	355	26.20	343	45.67
Onotoa	Nutea Williams	247	18.23	259	34.49
Onotoa	Riteti Eritama	144	10.63	149	19.84
Onotoa	Benati Nenebati	108	7.97		
Onotoa	Katatia Tauteang	107	7.90		
South Tarawa (TUC)	Harry Tong	3,517	26.65		
South Tarawa (TUC)	Teburoro Tito	3,279	24.85	3,426	31.08
South Tarawa (TUC)	Roniti Teiwaki	1,219	9.24	3,037	27.55
South Tarawa (TUC)	Tabwea Teitiniman	1,215	9.21	1,758	15.95
South Tarawa (TUC)	Bweitu Nabau	854	6.47	2,801	25.41
South Tarawa (TUC)	Nauan Bauro	748	5.67		
South Tarawa (TUC)	Tom Awira	515	3.90		
South Tarawa (TUC)	Biara Teanoana	342	2.59		
South Tarawa (TUC)	Tetika Teraku	304	2.30		
South Tarawa (TUC)	Tekarei Russell	297	2.25		
South Tarawa (TUC)	Abureti Takaio	226	1.71		
South Tarawa (TUC)	Bwenawa Io	209	1.58		
South Tarawa (TUC)	Mautaake Tannang	182	1.38		
South Tarawa (TUC)	Paul Tatireta	138	1.05		
South Tarawa (TUC)	Kaobunang Areieta	102	0.77		
South Tarawa (TUC)	Burataea Kaibaki	50	0.38		
Tabiteuea North	Taberannang Timeon	878	34.72		
Tabiteuea North	Teaiwa Tenieu	619	24.48	500	36.42
Tabiteuea North	Martin Puta Tofinga	578	22.85	700	50.98
Tabiteuea North	Tetaua Taitai	397	15.70	173	12.60
Tabiteuea North	Tebaniman Tito	57	2.25		
Tabiteuea South	Riino Nautonga	219	43.98	245	49.60
Tabiteuea South	Nantokana Meritera	165	33.13	221	44.74
Tabiteuea South	Tekaruru Teatau	79	15.86	28	5.67
Tabiteuea South	Karotu Teubwaitoi	35	7.03		
Tabuaeran	Kokoria Rakoroa	145	23.27	187	24.38
Tabuaeran	Tiinia Mariano	140	22.47	480	62.58
Tabuaeran	Tiare Bauro	101	16.21	100	13.04
Tabuaeran	Bakatie	100	16.05		
Tabuaeran	Rooti Teaotai	65	10.43		
Tabuaeran	Tauiaong Chin Song	36	5.78		
Tabuaeran	Taan	28	4.49		
Tabuaeran	Vakariki Maiolonga	8	1.28		
Tamana	Kabetite Mwetaka	327	71.24		
Tamana	Tabuata Tibereta	84	18.30		
Tamana	Toakauriri Autaene	48	10.46		
Teraina	Tetaake Eria	125	29.27	186	43.16
Teraina	Raerang Teangauba	88	20.61	130	30.16
Teraina	Koureia Uereie	81	18.97	115	26.68
Teraina	Kantara Beiaun	72	16.86		
Teraina	Kieni Kanitou	18	4.22		
Teraina	Tuua Tebiria	16	3.75		
Teraina	Ritiata E Matiare	9	2.11		
Teraina	Taburimai Baabu	7	1.64		
Teraina	Tuangeri Roubena	7	1.64		
Teraina	Baiteke Terii	4	0.94		

== Aftermath ==
Following the election, three independents allied with the Pillars of Truth. The new MPs were sworn in on 9 January 2003.
