= 1994 Kiribati presidential election =

Re-election of Teburoro Tito

- 30 September 1994
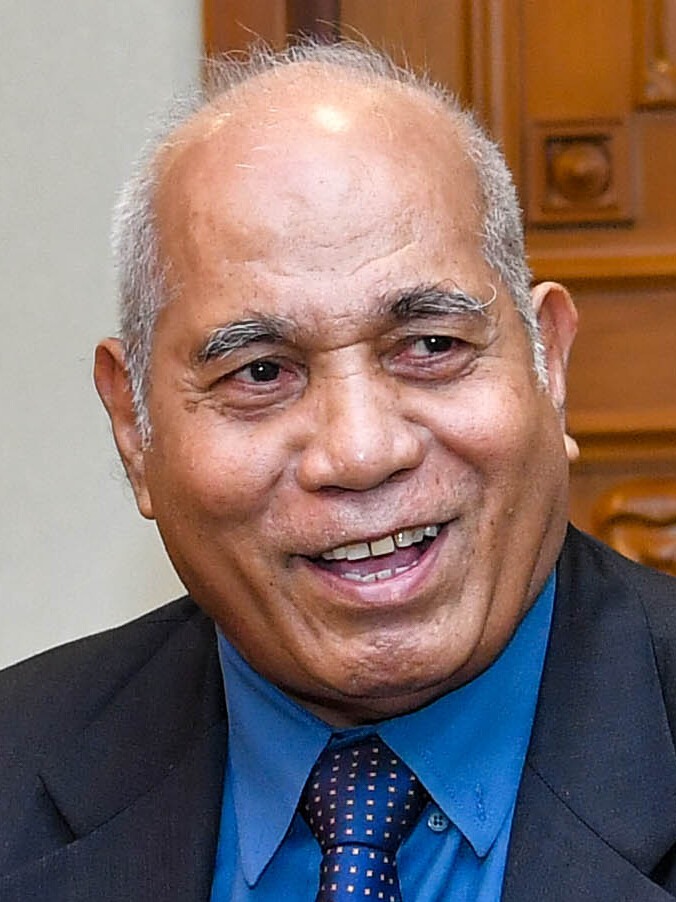

Candidate	Teburoro Tito	Tewareka Tentoa
Popular vote	10,834	3,886
Percentage	51.14%	18.34%
Home island	Tabiteuea	Onotoa
Candidate	Roniti Teiwaki	Peter Taberannang Timeon
Popular vote	3,383	3,080
Percentage	15.97%	14.54%
Home island		Tabiteuea
President before election
Ieremia Tabai
Elected President
Teburoro Tito

Presidential elections were held in Kiribati on 30 September 1994. The result was a victory for Teburoro Tito, who received 51% of the vote. The elections were held following a motion of no confidence that dissolved the government of incumbent president Teatao Teannaki while an investigation was opened in the possible misuse of travel expense claims by its ministers. Members of the government brought multiple defamation lawsuits against the opposition in response to the claims of misconduct, some of which were not resolved until years after the elections.

== Background ==
Vice-President Teatao Teannaki of the National Progressive Party (NPP) was elected president of Kiribati in 1991. Opposition leader Teburoro Tito led an investigation in 1993 to evaluate the travel expenses of Teannaki and his ministers. On the parliament floor on 16 December, he accused Teannaki's government of making inappropriate travel expense claims. The opposition proposed the creation of a select committee to investigate the matter in May 1994. The NPP objected, arguing that a select committee would be biased, and put forward an amendment that would make it an independent committee. The main opposition party, the Christian Democratic Party, joined with the centrist Maurin Kiribati Party to reject the amendment. The government tied the committee to a motion of no confidence, and the government was dissolved on 24 May when the vote failed 19 to 21.

Parliamentary elections were held in July. The Christian Democratic Party won a plurality with 13 seats, while the NPP's share was reduced to 7. The remaining 19 seats were held by independents. A major shift in party politics then took place: the Te Maneaba Party was created with Tito and Roniti Teiwaki at its head, while the independents rallied around Tewareka Tentoa in the Maurin Kiribati Party. The two groups formed a coalition, and only five members of parliament remained in the NPP.

=== Defamation lawsuits ===
While speeches made in parliament were given immunity, comments elsewhere were subject to legal challenges. At a public meeting on 30 May, opposition members again said that Teannaki had misappropriated government funds for his own use. Teannaki saw a recording of the meeting on 13 July and filed a defamation lawsuit in the Magistrates' Court of Abiang against a member of the opposition, adding Tito as a defendant when the hearing began on 21 July. The lawsuit was postponed until after the election and never resumed.

A similar lawsuit regarding the accusations was held the following month, where the Magistrates' Court of Betio ruled that interpretation of the law was subjective enough that accusations of misconduct could be reasonably made without malice and that the speech was subject to qualified privilege. At the same time, Teannaki pursued a case in front of the High Court of Kiribati on 22 August, but proceedings were still underway on the date of the presidential election. Supreme Justice Faqir Mohammed overturned the case in Betio and combined the defamation cases into a single case in front of the High Court on 14 September. While doing so, he said that there was "not a shred of evidence", disregarding the expense claims that had been filed as evidence in the lower court. The NPP argued that this was effectively an exoneration.

== Candidates and campaign ==
The opposition had enough votes to control all four positions on the presidential ballot and filled them with its own candidates. It selected Teburoro Tito, Tewareka Tentoa, Roniti Teiwaki, and Peter Taberannang Timeon. Teiwaki and Timeon defected to the opposition prior to the election.

- Tito was a member of parliament from Tabiteuea. Prior to the election, he was the opposition leader against Teannaki's government. He previously worked as a teacher. Tito was previously a candidate in the 1987 presidential election.
- Teiwaki was a member of parliament for the Teinainano Urban Council constituency. He served in parliament until 1982, where he was minister of education and minister of finance. He returned to parliament in a 1990 by-election. Teiwaki was previously a candidate in the 1978 Chief Minister election and the 1991 presidential election.
- Tentoa was a member of parliament from Onotoa, first elected to parliament in 1982. He became the leader of a group of independents, Reitan Kiribati, leading up to the 1991 election. Tentoa was previously a candidate in the 1983 presidential election.
- Timeon was a member of parliament from Tabiteuea. He previously served as Secretary of Cabinet.

The candidates sought support by making election promises, which were a novelty in presidential elections at the time. Historically, the personalities of candidates were more important than policy proposals. Tito's campaign implemented another novel strategy by using video tapes to spread his message, including one that made accusations against Teannaki's government and prompted defamation lawsuits.

All four supported subsidies for the copra industry. They also supported the abolition of certain school fees, particularly those that disproportionately affected citizens of the outer islands.

== Results ==
The presidential election was held on 30 September. Teburoro Tito won with 51.14% of the vote. One theory is that Tito's victory can be attributed to his performance in parliamentary debates prior to the motion of no confidence.

Candidate	Votes	%
Teburoro Tito	10,834	51.14
Tewareka Tentoa	3,886	18.34
Roniti Teiwaki	3,383	15.97
Peter Taberannang Timeon	3,080	14.54
Total	21,183	100.00
Source: Somoza

== Aftermath ==
Tito took office on 1 October. His election ended the NPP's control of the government for the first time since the nation's independence and shifted government policy from austerity to increased spending.

A new defamation case was filed on 28 October by Taomati Iuta, who had been Teannaki's vice president, but it was postponed while Teannaki's case was pending. Teannaki challenged the election results on 31 October and asked that they be voided, alleging that Tito had engaged in corrupt practices during the campaign. Chief Justice Richard Lussick heard the case the following year. He determined that the only allegation with merit was that Tito had offered tobacco to potential voters, but that this was a social custom that did not amount to corruption. Teannaki was ordered to pay approximately $32,000 for solicitor's fees and the costs of transporting witnesses.

Various legal challenges—and the infrequent meetings of the Court of Appeals to address them—meant that Teannaki's defamation case was not heard by the High Court until 29 September 2000. Chief Justice Robin Millhouse felt that he had a conflict of interest in a ruling involving the president, so Australian judge John Toohey was selected as a neutral party to hear the case. Three days into the hearing, Teannaki withdrew his claim and was ordered to pay Tito's legal fees. Iuta's case was then raised, but it was dismissed when Iuta did not provide securities for legal costs.

Tito was reelected in the 1998 and 2003 presidential elections. He was then removed by a motion of no confidence in March 2003 and succeeded by Anote Tong.
