= 1998 Kiribati presidential election =

Second re-election of Teburoro Tito

- 27 November 1998
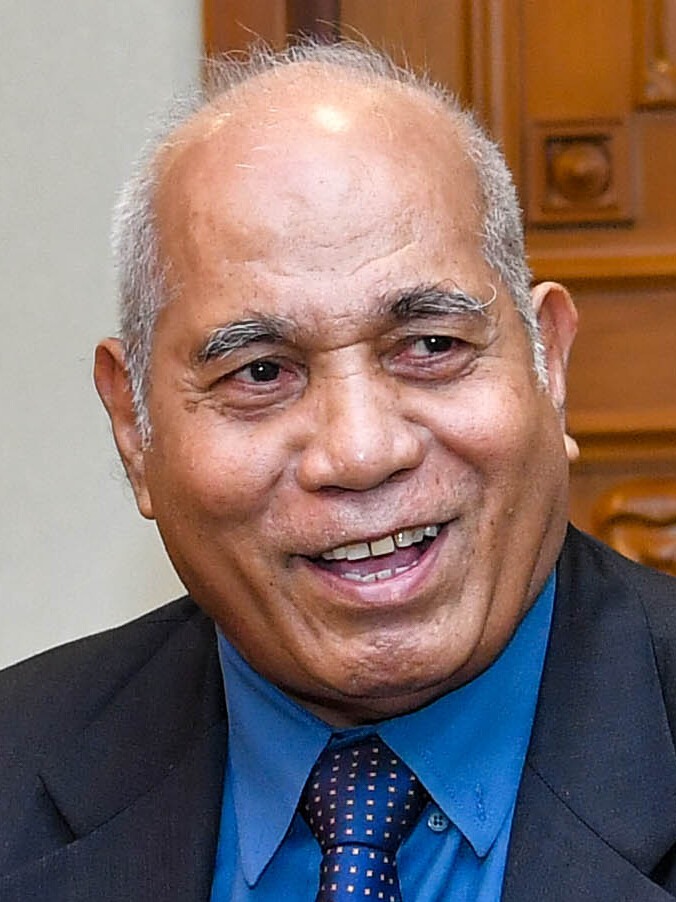

Candidate	Teburoro Tito	Harry Tong
Popular vote	13,309	11,658
Percentage	52.33%	45.84%
Home island	Tabiteuea	Tabuaeran
President before election
Teburoro Tito
Elected President
Teburoro Tito

Presidential elections were held in Kiribati on 27 November 1998. Incumbent president Teburoro Tito was reelected with 52.33 percent of the vote, defeating challengers Harry Tong and Amberoti Nikora.

== Background and campaign ==
Deputy opposition leader Teburoro Tito, who had previously served as opposition leader, was elected President of Kiribati in the 1994 presidential election as a member of the Christian Democratic Party. His government and the opposition both lost seats in the House of Assembly during the September 1998 parliamentary elections.

The candidates were chosen by the House of Assembly, voting on which three of its members would appear on the ballot. It selected Tito, Harry Tong, and Amberoti Nikora. Nikora was chosen to represent the opposition party Boutokan Te Koaua.

== Results ==
The presidential election was held on 27 November. Tito was reelected with 52.33 percent of the vote. It was the second election, following the one of 1994, in which the vote difference of the winner and the runner up was greater than the combined votes of other candidates.

Candidate	Votes	%
Teburoro Tito	13,309	52.33
Harry Tong	11,658	45.84
Amberoti Nikora	465	1.83
Total	25,432	100.00
Source: Somoza

== Aftermath ==
Tito was reelected again in the February 2003 presidential election, but his government was dissolved the following month through a motion of no confidence. He was succeeded by Anote Tong.
