= 2007 Kiribati parliamentary election =

- 22 August 2007 (first round); 30 August 2007 (second round)
- 44 of the 46 seats in the House of Assembly; 22 seats needed for a majority
Party	Leader	Seats	+/–
PTK	Anote Tong	18	+2
Protectionist	Harry Tong	7	−17
Independents	–	19	+19
This lists parties that won seats. See the complete results below.

Parliamentary elections were held in Kiribati on 22 August 2007 and 30 August 2007, within 23 constituencies (electoral districts) used to elect 44 MPs (43,000 citizens vote). Two other MPs were ex officio members (not elected).

There were 146 candidates in the first round, including all 44 sitting MPs, among them President Anote Tong. Most of them represent Pillars of Truth or Protect the Maneaba.

The main issues were education and employment.

== Results ==
Eighteen seats were decided in the first round (including that of Tong, who was overwhelmingly re-elected). Tong's Pillars of Truth and allies independents got twelve of the eighteen seats. For the twenty-six seats where no candidate received a majority, a second round was held on 30 August.

Party	First round			Second round			Total seats
Party	Votes	%	Seats	Votes	%	Seats	Total seats
Pillars of Truth			10			8	18
Protect the Maneaba			2			5	7
Independents			6			13	19
Appointed members							2
Total			18			26	46
Total votes				24,330	–		
Registered voters/turnout	43,184	–		36,022	67.54		
Source: Adam Carr, IPU

=== By constituency ===
Constituency	Candidate	First round		Second round	
Constituency	Candidate	Votes	%	Votes	%
Abaiang	Teatao Teannaki	1,256	23.75		
Abaiang	John Collins	1,119	21.16	839	22.30
Abaiang	Bauro Tongaai	1,118	21.14	1,007	26.76
Abaiang	Kautu Tenaua	938	17.74	990	26.31
Abaiang	Emile Schutze	757	14.32	927	24.63
Abaiang	Ioteebwa Ieremia	100	1.89		
Abemama	Willie Tokataake	692	28.36	681	31.90
Abemama	Naatan Teewe	591	24.22	646	30.26
Abemama	Namanoku Atauea	481	19.71	533	24.96
Abemama	Morotin Timiti	232	9.51	275	12.88
Abemama	Tamoaieta T, Kaeka	184	7.54		
Abemama	Baitongo Taburimai	170	6.97		
Abemama	Bwenawa Io	90	3.69		
Aranuka	Amberoti Nikora	437	75.22		
Aranuka	Iamti Rakautu	144	24.78		
Arorae	Teima Onorio	422	78.15		
Arorae	Uria Mataio	118	21.85		
Banaba	Timon R, Aneri	180	92.31		
Banaba	Pelenise Pilitasi	15	7.69		
Beru	Tetabo Nakara	565	27.57		
Beru	Tebwatoa Uereti	365	17.81	280	26.57
Beru	Mantaia Kaongotao	294	14.35	246	23.34
Beru	Kirabuke Teiaaua	225	10.98	528	50.09
Beru	Koronaa Teribaa	211	10.30		
Beru	Biribo Neemia	171	8.35		
Beru	Tewareka Boorau	114	5.56		
Beru	Rameka Takirua	82	4.00		
Beru	Otiuea Tanentoa	22	1.07		
Betio (BTC)	Iotebwa Redfern	1,924	20.82	2,124	21.99
Betio (BTC)	Tonganibeia Taam	1,737	18.80	2,011	20.82
Betio (BTC)	Mary Tamwi	1,551	16.79	1,828	18.93
Betio (BTC)	Reete Bokai	1,290	13.96	2,033	21.05
Betio (BTC)	Raoranti Jack	1,045	11.31	1,663	17.22
Betio (BTC)	Teiraoi T Tetabea	683	7.39		
Betio (BTC)	Beitika Airam	627	6.79		
Betio (BTC)	Pine Iosefa	250	2.71		
Betio (BTC)	Tonga Teikarawa	75	0.81		
Betio (BTC)	Henry Kaake	58	0.63		
Butaritari	Alexander Teabo	1,030	37.50		
Butaritari	Arawaia Rabaua	615	22.39	399	27.94
Butaritari	Toakai Koririntetaake	583	21.22	787	55.11
Butaritari	Mareweia Redfern	445	16.20	242	16.95
Butaritari	Arobati Atunibeia	74	2.69		
Kiritimati	Tieikabu Teem	876	14.07	964	19.85
Kiritimati	Miire Raieta	784	12.59	798	16.43
Kiritimati	Mikaere Baraniko	691	11.10	1,234	25.41
Kiritimati	Tawita Temoku	676	10.86	1,008	20.75
Kiritimati	Tiim Taekiti	674	10.83	853	17.56
Kiritimati	Timei Kaitaua	555	8.92		
Kiritimati	Tarere Ataia	403	6.47		
Kiritimati	Rutio Bangao	401	6.44		
Kiritimati	Tekinaiti Kaiteie	318	5.11		
Kiritimati	Vaimalie Naare	195	3.13		
Kiritimati	Tokanibeia Tominiko	173	2.78		
Kiritimati	Bunatao Arioka	101	1.62		
Kiritimati	Toariri Teema	96	1.54		
Kiritimati	Biita Atauea	88	1.41		
Kiritimati	Teakin Iakobwa	67	1.08		
Kiritimati	Teeneti Tatireta	59	0.95		
Kiritimati	Teikori Kantabu	49	0.79		
Kiritimati	Teoro Taatea	19	0.31		
Kuria	Matang Tekitanga	231	41.92	290	52.92
Kuria	Veronica Bakeua	203	36.84	255	46.53
Kuria	Baraniko Mooa	74	13.43	3	0.55
Kuria	Tekei Borauea	43	7.80		
Maiana	Anote Tong	1,048	48.63		
Maiana	Teiwaki Areieta	692	32.11		
Maiana	Tioera Baitika	415	19.26		
Makin	James Taom	724	43.12		
Makin	Kouramaere Kautoa	420	25.01	485	58.22
Makin	Marouea Kamraratu	211	12.57	202	24.25
Makin	Ioketan Binataake	120	7.15	146	17.53
Makin	Kauaba Ibutuna	116	6.91		
Makin	Moannatu Kireua	60	3.57		
Makin	Marewenkiata Tiotaake	23	1.37		
Makin	Rui Bureimoa	5	0.30		
Marakei	Temate Ereateiti	506	25.29	466	25.80
Marakei	Patrick Tatireta	441	22.04	541	29.96
Marakei	Rutita Tonana	376	18.79	390	21.59
Marakei	Rutiano Benetito	321	16.04	409	22.65
Marakei	Tamatau Baram	221	11.04		
Marakei	Tabeara Rotan	74	3.70		
Marakei	Kantera Tebwebwe	62	3.10		
Nikunau	Rimeta Beniamina	405	24.71	426	30.30
Nikunau	Kaneang Betero	338	20.62	306	21.76
Nikunau	Tabokai Kiritome	232	14.15	323	22.97
Nikunau	Moote Terukaio	227	13.85	351	24.96
Nikunau	Toom Awira	212	12.93		
Nikunau	Kireata Ruteru	128	7.81		
Nikunau	Kainnako T, Kairaoi	97	5.92		
Nonouti	Ieremia Tabai	726	34.64		
Nonouti	Kunei Etekiera	495	23.62	541	44.97
Nonouti	Ata Etekia	336	16.03	281	23.36
Nonouti	Moua Tikare	314	14.98	381	31.67
Nonouti	Katua Tabunga	162	7.73		
Nonouti	Eromanga Ribaro	43	2.05		
Nonouti	Teriata Nakibae	20	0.95		
North Tarawa (ETC)	Inatio Tanentoa	1,208	22.08	1,145	23.49
North Tarawa (ETC)	Bauro Tenano	1,105	20.19	1,177	24.15
North Tarawa (ETC)	Nabuti Mwemwenikarawa	999	18.26	1,194	24.50
North Tarawa (ETC)	Kataotika Tekee	824	15.06	995	20.41
North Tarawa (ETC)	Tatoa Kaiteie	555	10.14	363	7.45
North Tarawa (ETC)	Uakerita Kanoanie	386	7.05		
North Tarawa (ETC)	Nauma Bateriki	280	5.12		
North Tarawa (ETC)	Ako Ritema	85	1.55		
North Tarawa (ETC)	Toawea Biribo	30	0.55		
Onotoa	Taaneti Mamau	579	41.18		
Onotoa	Kouraiti Beniato	377	26.81	546	68.34
Onotoa	Natanaera Kirata	195	13.87	117	14.64
Onotoa	Neeri Tiaeke	146	10.38	136	17.02
Onotoa	Nei Beta Tentoa	109	7.75		
South Tarawa (TUC)	Teburoro Tito	3,906	21.10	4,238	25.56
South Tarawa (TUC)	Harry Tong	3,078	16.63	3,396	20.48
South Tarawa (TUC)	Banuera Berina	2,725	14.72	3,035	18.31
South Tarawa (TUC)	Mareko Tofinga	2,006	10.84	3,020	18.22
South Tarawa (TUC)	Batiri Bataua	1,843	9.96	2,890	17.43
South Tarawa (TUC)	Nei Maere Tekanene	1,591	8.59		
South Tarawa (TUC)	Timau Tiira	1,217	6.57		
South Tarawa (TUC)	Nauan Bauro	625	3.38		
South Tarawa (TUC)	Baua Tebau	607	3.28		
South Tarawa (TUC)	Taabia Kabaua	415	2.24		
South Tarawa (TUC)	Teatia Bangao	306	1.65		
South Tarawa (TUC)	Paul Tatireta	194	1.05		
Tabiteuea North	Taberannang Timeon	967	40.63		
Tabiteuea North	Tetaua Taitai	881	37.02		
Tabiteuea North	Martin Puta Tofinga	532	22.35		
Tabiteuea South	Tebuai Uaai	311	50.65		
Tabiteuea South	Titabu Tabane	303	49.35		
Tabuaeran	Tekiau Aretaateta	612	35.33		
Tabuaeran	Teetan Mweretaka	547	31.58		
Tabuaeran	Tinia Mariano	260	15.01		
Tabuaeran	Kotii Torite	117	6.76		
Tabuaeran	Ubauba Baati	81	4.68		
Tabuaeran	Taatea Itimaera	58	3.35		
Tabuaeran	Koraubara Maatai	40	2.31		
Tabuaeran	Teretino Aberaam	17	0.98		
Tamana	Kabetite Mwetaka	319	66.05		
Tamana	Toakauriri Autaene	164	33.95		
Teraina	Tetaake Eria	295	50.51		
Teraina	Nei Tara Ikauea	102	17.47		
Teraina	Rutitea Ritang	72	12.33		
Teraina	Tonginako Rubenteiti	68	11.64		
Teraina	Buanaki K, Tienti	47	8.05		
