= Rimeta Beniamina =

Kiribati politician

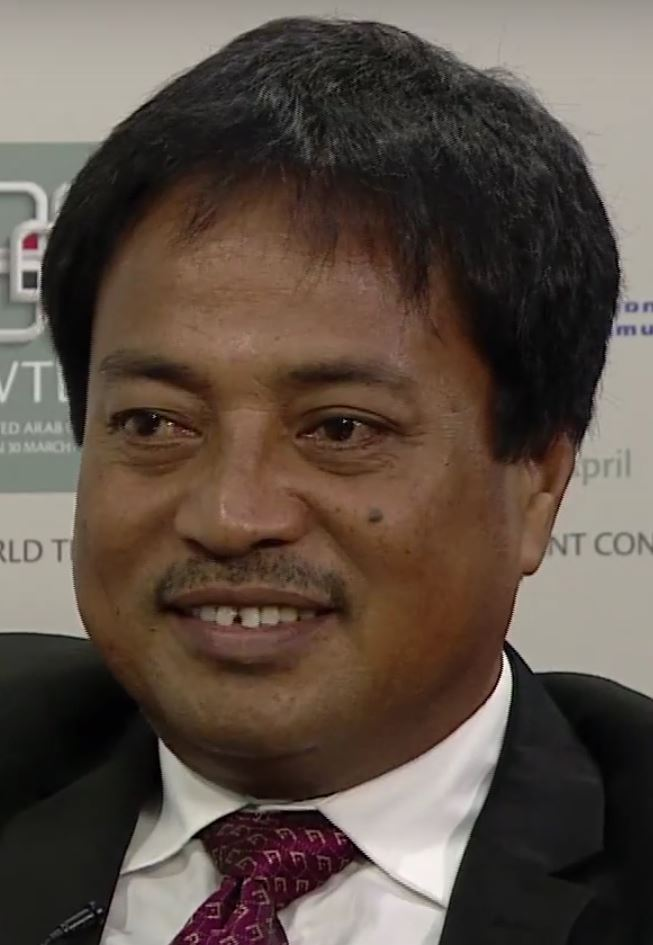
- Beniamina in 2014

Personal details
- Born: 29 December 1960 (age 65)
- Party: Maurin Kiribati Party (Before; 2013); Pillars of Truth (2013–present)
- Education: University of Tasmania

Rimeta Beniamina (born 29 December 1960) is an I-Kiribati politician and a former leader of the defunct United Coalition Party. Beniamina, who is from the island of Nikunau in southern Kiribati, is the son of former Vice President Beniamina Tinga.

Beniamina was one of three candidates nominated for President of Kiribati by parliament in November 2011. However, Beniamina lost to incumbent President Anote Tong on January 13, 2012, placing third in the presidential election.

In mid-October 2013, he was appointed to Tong's government as Minister for Communications, Transport and Tourism, following the resignation of the incumbent Taberannang Timeon, who had been accused of receiving an excessive allowance payment.
