= List of ambassadors of Kiribati to China =

Coordinates: 25.061591°N 121.648675°E

Ambassador of Kiribati to China
- Inaugural holder: Atanraoi Baiteke
- Formation: November 13, 1982

The Kiribati ambassador in Beijing is the official representative of the Government in Tarawa to the Government of the People's Republic of China.

== List of representatives ==
Diplomatic agrément/Diplomatic accreditation	ambassador	Observations	President of Kiribati	List of premiers of the People's Republic of China	Term end
June 25, 1980		The governments in Beijing and Tarawa established diplomatic relations.	Rota Onorio	Zhao Ziyang	November 29, 2003
November 13, 1982	Atanraoi Baiteke	October 6, 1981: High Commissioner (Commonwealth) in Canberra	Rota Onorio	Zhao Ziyang	
November 7, 2003		Diplomatic relations between the governments in Beijing and Tarawa were suspended following Kiribati's recognition of Taiwan.	Anote Tong	Wen Jiabao	
September 27, 2019		The governments in Beijing and Tarawa restored diplomatic relations.	Taneti Mamau	Li Keqiang	
2022	David Ateti Teaabo		Taneti Maamau	Li Keqiang	

- Sino-Pacific relations#Kiribati
- China–Kiribati relations
