= July 2003 Kiribati presidential election =

Election of Anote Tong

- 4 July 2003
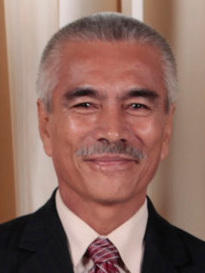

Candidate	Anote Tong	Harry Tong	Banuera Berina
Party	PTK	Protectionist	Independent
Popular vote	13,556	12,457	2,591
Percentage	47.39%	43.55%	9.06%
Home Island	Tabuaeran	Tabuaeran	Beru
President before election
Teburoro Tito
Elected President
Anote Tong

Presidential elections were held in Kiribati on 4 July 2003, the second in six months after previous president Teburoro Tito was removed from office by a motion of no confidence in the Parliament just a month after winning the February elections, and just a day into his new term. The Kiribati Court of Appeal ruled that the single day in office constituted a third term, barring him from standing in further elections in accordance with the constitution.

The result was a victory for Anote Tong, who defeated his brother Harry Tong by just under 4%.

== Background ==
Incumbent president Teburoro Tito won reelection against former cabinet secretary Taberannang Timeon in February 2003. Tito was criticised during the campaign for his decision to work with China toward maintaining a satellite-tracking facility in the Kiribati capital, Tarawa. Two opposition members, brothers Harry Tong and Anote Tong, pushed against the lease. This culminated in a motion of no confidence against Tito's government in March 2003, which passed with 40 votes in favour and 21 opposed. New parliamentary elections were held in May, and Tito's government maintained control of the House of Assembly with 24 of the 40 seats.

== Campaign ==
Harry Tong and Anote Tong campaigned against each other to succeed Tito. Harry sided with the ruling party Maurin Maneaba while Anote sided with the opposition. The opposition alleged that they were unable to campaign through government-owned media outlets like Radio Kiribati and Te Uekara.

== Results ==
Anote Tong won the election with 47.4 percent of the vote against Harry's 43.5 percent. Another candidate, Banuera Berina, received 9.1 percent of the vote. This meant the margin between the winner and the runner-up was closer than the number of votes given to the third-place candidate.

Candidate	Party	Votes	%
Anote Tong	Pillars of Truth	13,556	47.39
Harry Tong	Protect the Maneaba	12,457	43.55
Banuera Berina	Independent	2,591	9.06
Total		28,604	100.00
Source: Psephos

== Aftermath ==
Under Tong's presidency, Kiribati ended diplomatic relations with China on November 1, 2003, and established them with Taiwan. The satellite-tracking facility was removed from Tarawa the same month. Tong was reelected in 2007 and 2011 for the legal maximum of three terms, and he was succeeded by Taneti Maamau of the Tobwaan Kiribati Party.
