= Meme Tong =

First Lady of Kiribati

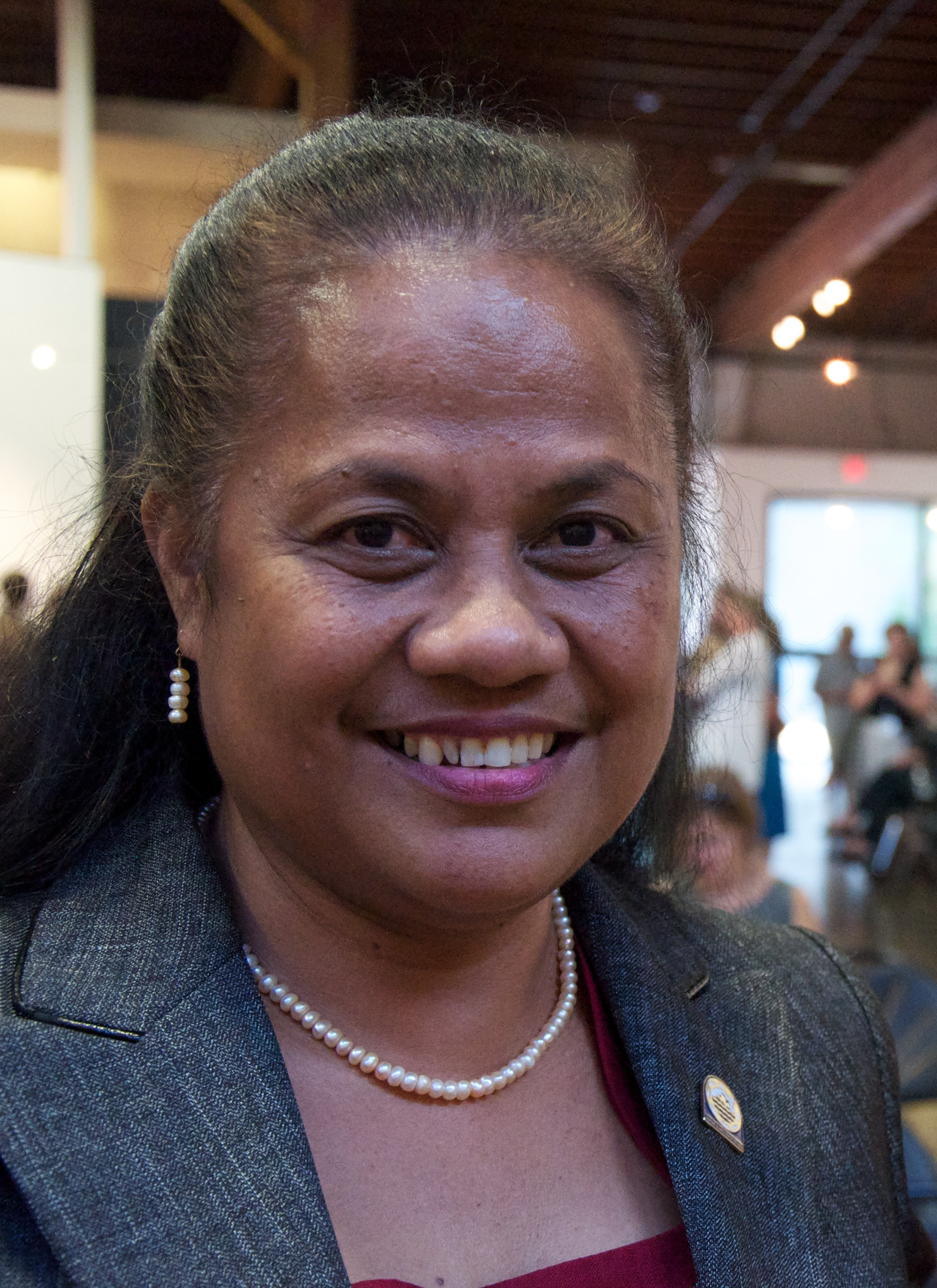
- Tong in 2011

First Lady of Kiribati
- In office 10 July 2003 – 11 March 2016
- President: Anote Tong
- Preceded by: Keina Tito
- Succeeded by: Teiraeng Mamau

Personal details
- Spouse: Anote Tong
- Children: 7

Nei Meme, also known as Bernadette Meme Tong, is the former First Lady of Kiribati. She is married to Anote Tong, the former President of the Republic of Kiribati. They have seven children, among them Vincent Tong, elected MP in 2020.

== See also ==
- Women in Kiribati
