= 2003 electoral calendar =

National and federal elections held in 2003

This electoral calendar for the year 2003 lists the national/federal direct elections to be held in 2003 in the de jure and de facto sovereign states. By-elections are excluded, though national referendums are included.

== January ==
- 5 January: Lithuania, President (second round)
- 10 January: Djibouti, Parliament
- 22 January: Netherlands, Parliament
- 28 January: Israel, Parliament

== February ==
- 9 February:
  - Monaco, Parliament
  - Montenegro, President (second round)
- 16 February: Cyprus, President
- 19 February: Armenia, President (first round)

== March ==
- 2 March: Estonia, Parliament
- 4 March: Micronesia, Parliament
- 5 March:
  - Syria, Parliament
  - Belize, Parliament
  - Armenia, President
- 8 March: Malta, Referendum
- 16 March:
  - Finland, Parliament
  - El Salvador, Parliament
- 30 March: Benin, Parliament

== April ==
- 12 April: Nigeria, Parliament
- 13 April: Malta, Parliament
- 14 April Somaliland, President
- 19 April: Nigeria, President
- 27 April:
  - Yemen, Parliament
  - Argentina, President (Country-wide) and Chamber of Deputies (La Rioja and Santiago del Estero)
  - Paraguay, President

== May ==
- 9 May: Kiribati, Parliament
- 10 May: Iceland, Parliament
- 11 May: Montenegro, President
- 18 May: Belgium, Federal Parliament
- 21 May: Barbados, House of Assembly
- 25 May: Armenia, Parliament

== June ==
- 1 June: Togo, President
- 7-8 June: Poland, Referendum
- 13-14 June: Czech Republic, Referendum
- 17 June: Jordan, Parliament

== July ==
- 4 July: Kiribati, President
- 5 July: Kuwait, Parliament
- 6 July: Mexico, Parliament (Chamber of Deputies)
- 27 July: Cambodia, Parliament

== August ==
- 3 August: North Korea, Parliament
- 24 August: Argentina, Chamber of Deputies (Buenos Aires City)
- 25 August: Rwanda, Parliament
- 31 August: Argentina, Chamber of Deputies (Río Negro)

== September ==
- 7 September: Argentina, Chamber of Deputies and Senate (Santa Fe)
- 14 September:
  - Argentina, Chamber of Deputies (Buenos Aires, Chaco, Jujuy and Santa Cruz)
  - Estonia, Referendum
- 19-20 September: Swaziland, Parliament (first round)
- 28 September: Argentina, Chamber of Deputies (Misiones and Neuquén)
- 29 September-2 October: Rwanda, Parliament

== October ==
- 4 October: Oman, Parliament
- 5 October: Argentina, Chamber of Deputies (Córdoba and San Juan) and Senate (Córdoba)
- 15 October: Azerbaijan, President
- 17 October: Maldives, President
- 18-19 October: Swaziland, Parliament (second round)
- 19 October: Argentina, Chamber of Deputies (Formosa)
- 19 October: Åland, Parliament
- 26 October: Argentina, Chamber of Deputies and Senate (Catamarca, La Pampa, Mendoza and Tucumán)

== November ==
- 2 November:
  - Georgia, Parliament
  - Georgia, Referendum
- 7 November: Mauritania, President
- 9 November:
  - Argentina, Chamber of Deputies and Senate (Chubut)
  - Japan, Parliament
  - Guatemala, President (first round)
- 16 November:
  - Argentina, Chamber of Deputies (Salta)
  - Serbia, President
- 17 November: Marshall Islands, Parliament
- 23 November:
  - Argentina, Chamber of Deputies (Corrientes, Entre Ríos, San Luis and Tierra del Fuego) and Senate (Corrientes)
  - Croatia, Parliament
- 27 November:
  - Grenada, Parliament
  - Gibraltar, Parliament

== December ==
- 7 December: Russia, Parliament
- 15 December: Northern Cyprus, Parliament
- 21 December: Guinea, President
- 28 December:
  - Serbia, Parliament
  - Guatemala, President (second round)
