= 2003 Kiribati parliamentary election =

Early parliamentary elections were held in Kiribati on 9 May 2003, with a second round on 14 May. The result was a victory for Protect the Maneaba, which won 24 of the 40 elected seats.

== Background ==
Parliamentary elections in 2002 and presidential elections in February 2003 had led to a government being formed by President Teburoro Tito. However, the government fell on 24 March 2003 after losing a budget vote in the House of Assembly on its first day of sitting. Tito took the matter to the Kiribati Court of Appeal, but lost, paving the way for fresh elections.

== Results ==
Party	Seats	+/–
Protect the Maneaba	24	+17
Pillars of Truth	16	–1
Total	40	0
Source: IPU

== Aftermath ==
Fresh presidential elections were held on 7 July and won by Anote Tong, who defeated his brother Harry Tong.
