= Corruption in Kiribati =

Corruption in Kiribati is a persistent problem. Due to Kiribati’s small population and limited resources, it is challenging to establish governance and oversight mechanisms, which has contributed to the incidence of corruption. Main corruption issues include political corruption and nepotism. Due to the lack of available studies and government data, it is challenging to determine the level and impact of corruption. However, it is estimated that Kiribati falls within the global average in terms of performance on government corruption indicators.

== Nepotism, favoritism, and bribery ==
Citing a Transparency International 2021 report, the United States State Department noted that nepotism and favoritism based on tribal and religious ties are still prevalent in Kiribati. Part of the reason why these cases of corruption persist is the lack of law enforcement. Although the anti-corruption unit of Kiribati's Public Service Office investigated complaints concerning these corrupt practices among senior officials, it fails to enforce anti-corruption law effectively. Preferential treatment in the awarding of government contracts also remains an issue.

Bribery remains widespread in the Pacific Islands region, with a Transparency International study revealing that Kiribati, Papua New Guinea, and the Federated States of Micronesia rank among the highest in terms of both the percentage of people who have paid a bribe and those who have been offered one in exchange for their votes during elections. Additionally, judicial bribery has emerged as a serious concern, with reports indicating that financial incentives have influenced legal decisions, compromising the integrity of the justice system and raising doubts about fairness in legal proceedings.

== Fishing industry ==
With the world's largest ocean Exclusive Economic Zone covering 3.5 million square kilometer, Kiribati's fishing industry contributes 51 percent to its GDP. Tuna fishing alone contributes up to 42 percent of the GDP. The economic significance of this industry makes it one of the corruption-prone sectors in the country. The most notable allegations of corruption involve mismanagement and the illegal dealings concerning the allocation of fishing licenses. This is aligned with a study that reported three key areas where corruption is likely to occur in the cases of Pacific Island countries: licensing, access agreements, and monitoring and inspection. Presently, there is a prevalence of illegal, unreported, and unregulated (IUU) fishing by foreign vessels within Kiribati's EEZ. Corruption allows perpetrators to obtain forged licenses or quotas, underreport quantities of caught fish at landing, and the sale of mislabeled fish, among others.

== Immigration ==
A report by Freedom House has identified immigration and foreign investment as an emergent corruption issue. It cited that the lack of oversight and transparency create opportunities for illicit dealings covering transactions that involve foreign investors. It also cited the irregularities in the granting of visas and immigration status, particularly for Chinese investors. One example involved irregularities in investor visa approvals, where officials allegedly fast-tracked applications for foreign investors in exchange for financial incentives, bypassing standard regulatory procedures.

There is also the case of foreign interference, particularly from China. For instance, former President Teburoro Tito entered into a 15-year land lease to China for a satellite-tracking facility. When he refused to release details of the transaction, his government collapsed in 2003.

== Anti-corruption measures ==
Kiribati has taken steps to address corruption through legislative reforms and international cooperation. The government has engaged with anti-corruption organizations to strengthen its legal framework and improve transparency in governance. However, the effectiveness of these measures is hindered by limited institutional capacity and by political influence.
