= Vincent Tong =

Vincent Tong may refer to:

- Vincent Tong (politician), Kiribati politician
- Vincent Tong (voice actor), Canadian voice actor
