= Women in Kiribati =

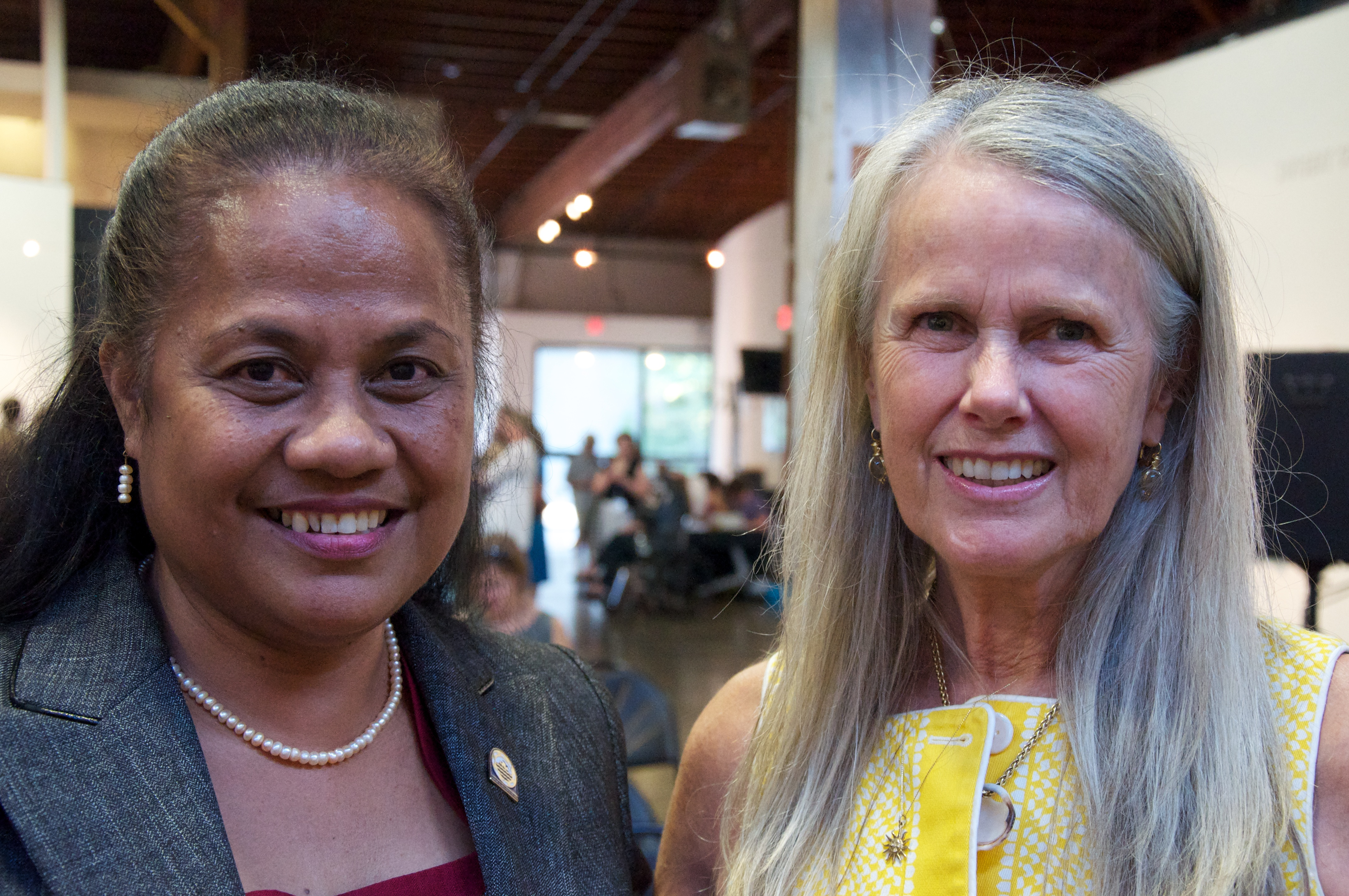
Nei Meme, on the left, is a former First Lady of Kiribati.

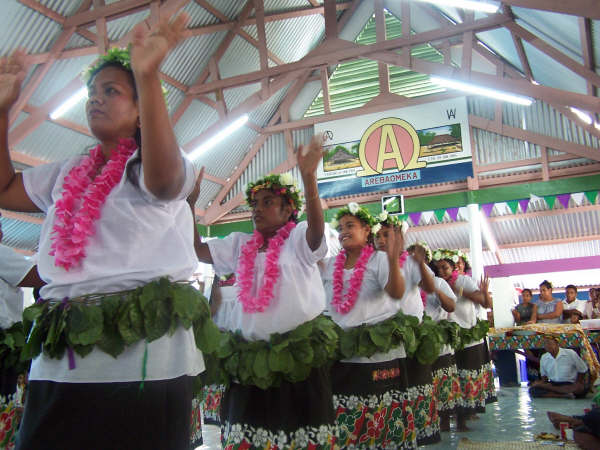
Women of Kiribati performing traditional dance.

Women in Kiribati are women who live in or are from the atoll nation of Kiribati. The role of Kiribati women is described in the publication Kiribati, A Situation Analysis of Children, Women and Youth (2005) as "largely defined by her age and marital status". Prestige is inherent to the married Kiribati woman, but she is considerably under the authority of her husband.

== Role in Kiribati society ==
In general - and despite the changing trends in Kiribati society - women are often treated as "subordinate to men". By tradition, Kiribati women can inherit and own land. However, they "usually still have less access to modern type of resources". But is a growing number of female Kiribati people who participate in skilled work, professional jobs, and governmental roles. To safeguard the reputation of Kiribati women, traditional restrictions apply, particularly values that are related to chastity. The responsibility of the women of Kiribati in household includes cooking meals, cleaning, infant care and welfare of the family. As figures in a Kiribati village, their social responsibilities and obligations - according to the so-called unimane - include meeting the buknibwai or "village shares", composed of sharing portions of "food, money and entertainment-related activities" to other villagers. For the community, women are responsible for producing "cash and traditional goods", and also includes fund-raising activities for the church. 50% of Kiribati's workforce are composed of women.

In Kiribati politics, UN Women stated that 4.3% of parliamentary seats are held by female politicians.

== See also ==
- Nei Meme, former First Lady of Kiribati
- Keina Tito, former First Lady of Kiribati
- Teresia Teaiwa
- Teretia Tokam
- Demographics of Kiribati
