= 2007 Kiribati presidential election =

First re-election of Anote Tong

- 17 October 2007
- Turnout: 56.98%
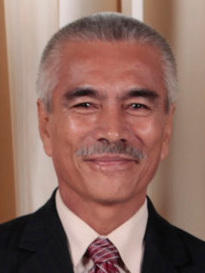

| Candidate | Anote Tong | Nabuti Mwemwenikarawa |
| Party | PTK | Independent |
| Popular vote | 15,664 | 8,149 |
| Percentage | 64.29% | 33.44% |
President before election
Anote Tong
Elected President
Anote Tong

Presidential elections were held in Kiribati on 17 October 2007, following the 2007 parliamentary election. Incumbent president Anote Tong, who was re-elected to parliament in the first round of the parliamentary election, sought another term as president and won with 64.29% of the popular vote. Opposition nominees failed to get onto the ballot, leading to a call for a boycott of the election.

== Background ==
=== Candidate Selection ===
At the first parliamentary session, four candidates were chosen to appear on the ballot. From the majority party (Pillars of Truth), incumbent president Anote Tong, Patrick Tatireta, and Banaba MP Timon Aneri were on the ballot. From the Maurin Kiribati Party, Nabuti Mwemwenikarawa, the Finance Minister at the time, was also on the ballot. Opposition nominees Harry Tong (Anote Tong's brother) and Tetaua Taitai, members of the Maurin Te M'aneaba party, were excluded from the ballot due to a failure to get through the second round of secret voting in Parliament. Because of this, the opposition called for a boycott of the election.

== Results ==
Voter turnout was around 57%. Tong received more than 15,500 votes, Mwemwenikarawa received over 8,000 votes, and Tatireta and Anera received less than 400 votes each. At the time of the election, there were more than 43,000 registered voters on Kiribati and a total population of 96,310. Mwemwenikarawa received the majority of votes on two islands: Butaritari (62.93%) and N.Tarawa (72.69%). Anote Tong received over 90% of the votes on three islands: Maiana (94.84%), Tamana (90.65%), and Arorae (93.88%.)

| Candidate | Party | Votes | % |
|---|---|---|---|
| Anote Tong | Pillars of Truth | 15,664 | 64.29 |
| Nabuti Mwemwenikarawa | Independent | 8,149 | 33.44 |
| Patrick Tatireta | Independent | 355 | 1.46 |
| Timon Aneri | Independent | 198 | 0.81 |
| Total | | 24,366 | 100.00 |
| Valid votes | | 24,366 | 99.34 |
| Invalid/blank votes | | 161 | 0.66 |
| Total votes | | 24,527 | 100.00 |
| Registered voters/turnout | | 43,042 | 56.98 |
Source: IFES
