= Tion =

Tion is a given name and may refer to:

- Tion Green (born 1993), an American football running back
- Tion Otang, an I-Kiribati bureaucrat
- Tion Wayne (born 1993), a Nigerian-British rapper and DJ
- Tion Webster (born 1995), a Trinidad and Tobago cricketer
