= Tekiree Tamuera =

I-Kiribati politician

Tekiree Tamuera (born 16 February 1940 in Maiana) is an I-Kiribati political figure.

He was of 24 May 1994 to 28 May 1994 acting president of Kiribati as chairman of the State Council. He served as the Speaker of the Parliament of Kiribati from 1994 to 2002.
