= Protect the Maneaba =

Protect the Maneaba Maneaban te Mauri
- Founded: 1985
- Dissolved: August 2010
- Merged into: United Coalition Party
- Ideology: Christian democracy
- Religion: Christianity

Protect the Maneaba (Gilbertese: Maneaban te Mauri, lit. 'Protect the meeting house', MTM), initially known as the Christian Democratic Party, was a political party in Kiribati.

== History ==
The party was established as the Christian Democratic Party in 1985 by members of the House of Assembly opposed to president Ieremia Tabai. By 1994 it had been renamed Protect the Maneaba, and was a loose grouping of MPs led by Roniti Teiwaki. In the 1994 parliamentary elections it won 13 of the 39 seats. In the subsequent presidential elections two months later, MTM's Teburoro Tito was elected president. In the 1998 parliamentary elections the party won 14 seats, with Tito re-elected president two months later. By the late 1990s the party had two dominant factions, a Christian-Democratic faction led by Tito and a liberal faction led by Tewareka Tentoa.

The party was reduced to only seven seats in the 2002 parliamentary elections, but Tito was re-elected as president in February 2003. However, the government losing a vote on the supplementary budget by a vote of 21–19 in March 2003 led to early parliamentary elections in May. Although MTM won 24 of the 40 seats, in the subsequent presidential elections in July, MTM candidate Harry Tong lost to his brother Anote.

The party was subsequently reduced to only seven seats in the 2007 parliamentary elections, and did not nominate a candidate for the presidential elections. In August 2010 it merged with the Kiribati Independent Party to form the United Coalition Party.
