= Vice-President of Kiribati =

The vice-president of Kiribati (Gilbertese: Kauoman-ni-Beretitenti) is the deputy head of State of the Republic of Kiribati. Their constitutional functions are to exercise the duties of the president of Kiribati, temporarily or permanently, should the latter be unable to do so, and to "be responsible for such business of the government (including the administration of any department) as the Beretitenti [President] may assign to him".

The president appoints a vice-president from among the government ministers. The vice-president must remain a member of Cabinet throughout his or her term.

The salary of the vice president is AUD 15,700 annually.

== List of officeholders ==
Political parties

National Progressive Party (NPP)
Christian Democratic Party (CDP) → Protect the Maneaba (MTM)
Pillars of Truth (PTK)
Tobwaan Kiribati Party (TKP)

Symbols

^{†} Died in office

No.	Portrait	Name (Birth–Death)	Term of office			Political party	Notes
No.	Portrait	Name (Birth–Death)	Took office	Left office	Time in office	Political party	Notes
1		Teatao Teannaki (1936–2016)	12 July 1979	4 July 1991	11 years, 357 days	NPP	
2		Taomati Iuta (1939–2016)	4 July 1991	24 May 1994	2 years, 324 days	NPP	
3		Tewareka Tentoa (19??–2000)	1 October 1994	3 November 2000^{[†]}	6 years, 33 days	CDP until 1994 renamed to MTM	
4		Beniamina Tinga (born 19??)	17 November 2000	28 March 2003	2 years, 131 days	MTM	
5		Teima Onorio (born 1963)	10 July 2003	12 March 2016	12 years, 246 days	PTK	
6		Kourabi Nenem (born 19??)	13 March 2016	18 June 2019	3 years, 97 days	TKP	
7		Teuea Toatu (19??–2026)	19 June 2019	November 2026^{[†]}	less than 7 years, 149 days	TKP	
