= President of Kiribati =

Head of state and government

- Beretitenti o Kiribati (Gilbertese)
- Seal of Government of the Republic of Kiribati

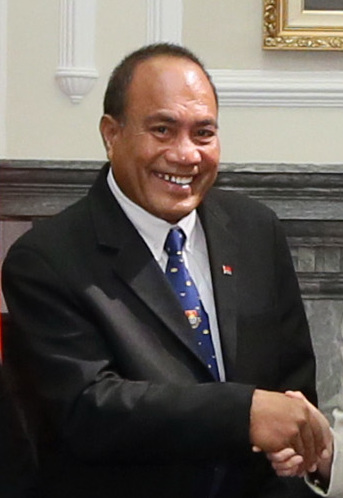
- Incumbent; Taneti Maamau since 11 March 2016
- Executive branch of the Government of Kiribati
- Term length: Four years, renewable twice
- Constituting instrument: Constitution of Kiribati (1979)
- Inaugural holder: Ieremia Tabai
- Formation: 12 July 1979; 47 years ago
- Deputy: Vice President of Kiribati
- Salary: AUD 17,900/US$ 12,013 annually
- Website: https://www.president.gov.ki/

The president of Kiribati (Gilbertese: Beretitenti) is the head of state and head of government of Kiribati.

Following a general election, by which citizens elect the members of the House of Assembly, members select from their midst "not less than 3 nor more than 4 candidates" for the presidency. No other person may stand as candidate. The citizens of Kiribati then elect the president from among the proposed candidates with first-past-the-post voting.

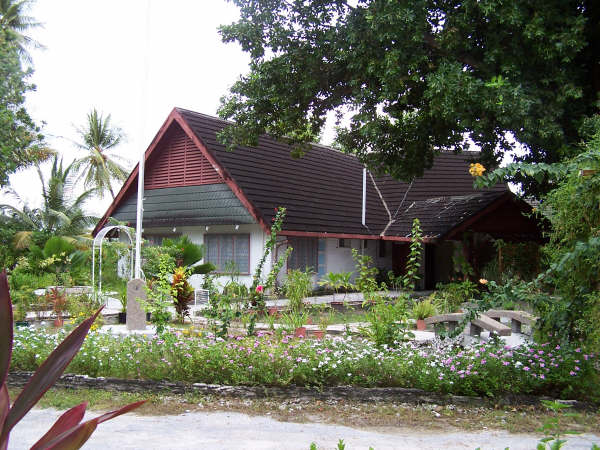
The Presidential residence, former Government House, Bairiki.

== List of officeholders ==
Political parties

National Progressive Party (NPP)
Independent
Christian Democratic Party (CDP) → Protect the Maneaba (MTM)
Pillars of Truth (PTK)
Tobwaan Kiribati Party (TKP)

Status

Denotes acting president

No.	Portrait	Name (Birth–Death)	Elected	Term of office			Political party
No.	Portrait	Name (Birth–Death)	Elected	Took office	Left office	Time in office	Political party
1		Ieremia Tabai (born 1949)	1978; 1982	12 July 1979	10 December 1982 (removed from office)	3 years, 151 days	NPP
—		Rota Onorio (1919–2004); Acting president	—	10 December 1982	18 February 1983	70 days	Independent
2		Ieremia Tabai (born 1949)	1983; 1987	18 February 1983	4 July 1991	8 years, 136 days	NPP
3		Teatao Teannaki (1936–2016)	1991	4 July 1991	24 May 1994 (removed from office)	2 years, 324 days	NPP
—		Tekiree Tamuera (born 1940); Acting president	—	24 May 1994	28 May 1994	4 days	Independent
—		Ata Teaotai (born 1953); Acting president	—	28 May 1994	1 October 1994	126 days	Independent
4		Teburoro Tito (born 1952)	1994; 1998; 2003 (Feb)	1 October 1994	28 March 2003 (removed from office)	8 years, 178 days	CDP until 1994 renamed to MTM
—		Tion Otang (born 19??); Acting president	—	28 March 2003	10 July 2003	104 days	Independent
5		Anote Tong (born 1952)	2003 (Jul); 2007; 2012	10 July 2003	11 March 2016	12 years, 245 days	PTK
6		Taneti Maamau (born 1960)	2016; 2020; 2024	11 March 2016	Incumbent	10 years, 251 days	TKP

The highest rank of the Kiribati Scout Association is the President's Award.

== Latest election ==
Candidate	Party	Votes	%
Taneti Maamau	Tobwaan Kiribati Party	20,676	55.05
Kaotitaake Kokoria	Independent	15,787	42.03
Bautaake Beia	Tobwaan Kiribati Party	1,094	2.91
Total		37,557	100.00
Valid votes		37,557	99.70
Invalid/blank votes		114	0.30
Total votes		37,671	100.00
Registered voters/turnout		54,776	68.77
Source: Maneaba ni Maungatabu

=== By electoral district ===
Vote share by electoral district
Electoral district	Bautaake Beia	Kaotitaake Kokoria	Taneti Maamau	Valid	Invalid/ blank	Total	Registered voters	Turnout (%)
Abaiang	81	967	1,043	2,091	4	2,095	3,176	66.0
Abemama	37	598	824	1,459	6	1,465	2,082	70.4
Aranuka	13	217	271	501	0	501	729	69.0
Arorae	16	303	64	383	0	383	530	72.3
Banaba	3	36	111	150	0	150	220	68.2
Beru	29	452	472	953	5	958	1,197	80.0
Betio	125	2,108	2,720	4,953	11	4,964	7,855	63.2
Butaritari	30	242	1,172	1,444	1	1,445	1,732	83.2
Fanning (Tabuaeran)	9	862	99	970	2	972	1,108	87.7
Kiritimati (and Kanton)	99	1,483	1,280	2,862	8	2,870	3,879	74.0
Kuria	7	314	155	476	2	478	683	70.0
Maiana	42	536	345	923	2	925	1,255	73.7
Makin	33	297	428	758	2	760	1,111	68.4
Marakei	40	211	851	1,102	0	1,102	1,552	71.1
Nikunau	31	269	639	939	2	941	1,143	82.3
Nonouti	27	661	390	1,074	0	1,078	1,484	72.6
North Tabiteuea	74	593	869	1,536	3	1,539	2,086	73.8
Onotoa	3	29	758	790	2	792	930	85.2
Rural Tarawa (North Tarawa)	87	936	1,655	2,678	17	2,695	4,183	64.4
South Tabiteuea	1	57	438	496	1	497	648	76.7
Tamana	7	125	142	274	0	274	420	65.2
Tarawa Teinainano (South Tarawa)	217	4,320	5,430	9,967	46	10,013	15,823	63.3
Teraina	83	171	520	774	0	774	950	81.5
Total	1,094	15,787	20,676	37,557	114	37,667	54,776	68.8
Source: Maneaba ni Maungatabu

== See also ==
- Governor of the Gilbert and Ellice Islands
- Vice-President
