= Tekiau Aretaateta =

Member of the Kiribati House of Assembly

Member of the House of Assembly
- In office 2007–2020
- Constituency: Tabuaeran

Personal details
- Political party: Pillars of Truth

Tekiau Aretaateta was a member of the Kiribati House of Assembly for the constituency of Tabuaeran.
