= 1998 Kiribati parliamentary election =

Parliamentary elections were held in Kiribati on 23 September 1998, with a second round on 30 September. Although all candidates for the 40 seats ran as independents, they could be divided into three groups; the National Progressive Party, Protect the Maneaba, and unaffiliated independents. Independents emerged as the largest group in the House of Assembly with 15 of the 40 seats.

== Results ==
| Party | Seats | +/– |
|---|---|---|
| Protect the Maneaba | 14 | +1 |
| National Progressive Party | 11 | +4 |
| Independents | 15 | –4 |
| Total | 40 | +1 |
Source: Nohlen et al.
