= Rota Onorio =

Kiribati politician (1919–2004)

Rota Erimariki Onorio MBE (26 October 1919 – 14 September 2004) was an I-Kiribati politician who served as acting president as chairman of the Council of State of Kiribati from 10 December 1982 to 18 February 1983, and also as Speaker of the House of Assembly from 1979 to 1982.

== Biography ==
Onorio was born on 26 October 1919. He was appointed an MBE in the 1970 Birthday Honours. Onorio died on 14 September 2004, at the age of 84. His daughter, Teima Onorio, served as the vice president of Kiribati from 2003 to 2016.
