= Mote Terukaio =

I-Kiribati politician

Member of the House of Assembly
- In office 2007–2016
- Constituency: Nikunau

Personal details
- Political party: Pillars of Truth

Mote Terukaio was a member of the Kiribati House of Assembly for the constituency of Nikunau.
