= Tion Otang =

Tion Otang is an I-Kiribati bureaucrat. On March 28, 2003, Teburoro Tito, President of Kiribati was removed from power by a motion of no confidence in the House of Assembly of Kiribati. On such occasions, the Council of State (comprising the Chair of the Public Service Commission, the Speaker and the Chief Justice) assumes all executive functions until the next presidential election. As then-Chair of the Public Service Commission, Otang was also ex officio Chair of the Council of State. The Council of State remained in power until the election of Anote Tong on July 10, 2003.
