= Kourabi Nenem =

I-Kiribati politician

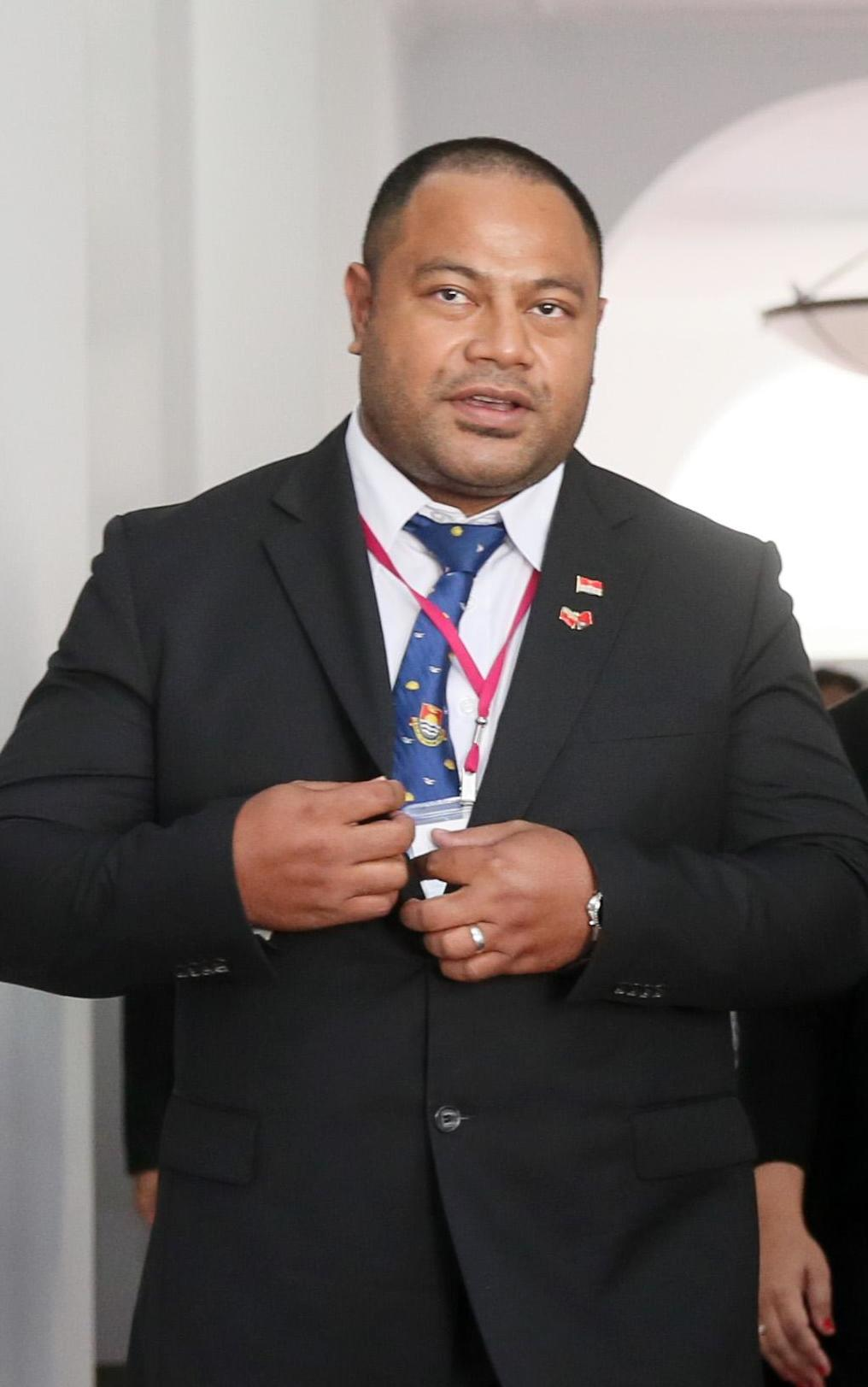
- Nenem in 2016

6th Vice President of Kiribati
- In office 13 March 2016 – 18 June 2019
- President: Taneti Maamau
- Preceded by: Teima Onorio
- Succeeded by: Teuea Toatu

Minister for Public Works and Utilities
- In office 2016–2018

Ministry of Women, Youth, Sports and Social Affairs
- In office 2018–2019

Member of the House of Assembly
- In office 2016–2020
- Constituency: South Tarawa

Kourabi Nenem is an I-Kiribati politician who served as the vice president of Kiribati from March 2016 until June 2019.
