= Ata Teaotai =

I-Kiribati politician

Ata Teaotai OBE (born in 1953) is an I-Kiribati political figure.

In 1978, he was part of a delegation that negotiated for independence of Kiribati from Britain. He was from 28 May 1994 to 1 October 1994 acting president of Kiribati as chairman of the State Council.
