= 1994 Kiribati parliamentary election =

- 24 July 1994 (first round); 31 July 1994 (second round)
- 39 seats in the House of Assembly
Party	Leader	Seats
Protectionist	Roniti Teiwaki	13
National Progressive	Teatao Teannaki	7
Independents	–	19
This lists parties that won seats. See the complete results below.

Parliamentary elections were held in Kiribati on 24 July 1994, with a second round on 31 July. Although all 260 candidates for the 39 seats ran as independents, they could be divided into three groups; the National Progressive Party, Protect the Maneaba, and unaffiliated independents. Independents emerged as the largest group in the House of Assembly with 19 of the 39 seats.

== Results ==
Party	Seats
Protect the Maneaba	13
National Progressive Party	7
Independents	19
Total	39
Source: Nohlen et al.
