= February 2003 Kiribati presidential election =

Third re-election of Teburoro Tito

- 25 February 2003
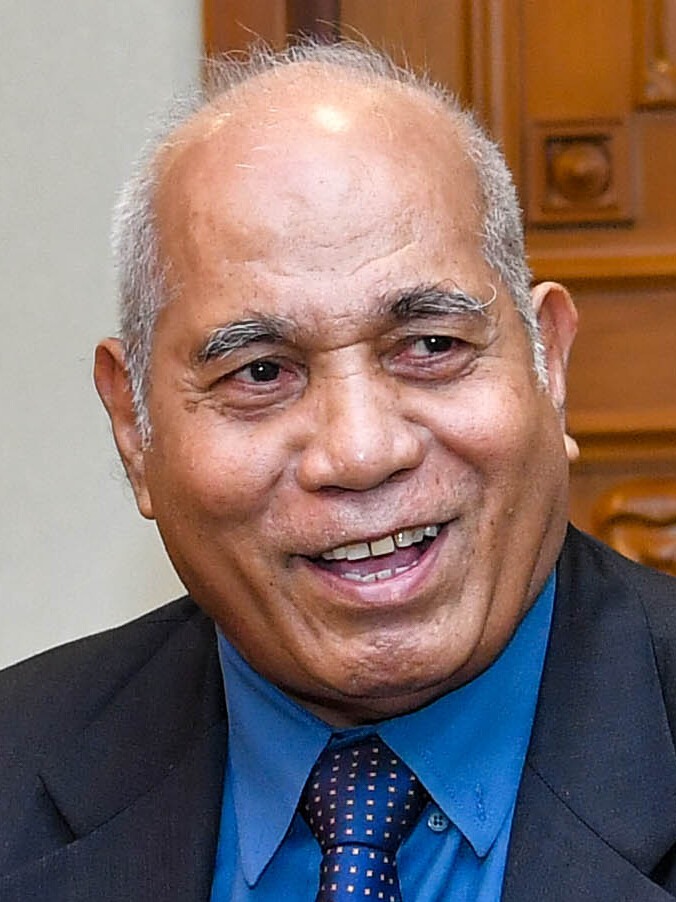

Candidate	Teburoro Tito	Taberannang Timeon
Popular vote	14,160	13,613
Percentage	50.35%	48.41%
Home Island	Tabiteuea	Tabiteuea
President before election
Teburoro Tito
Elected President
Teburoro Tito

Presidential elections were held in Kiribati on 25 February 2003. The result was a victory for incumbent President Teburoro Tito, who received 50% of the vote. However, Tito was removed from office following a vote of no confidence in the House of Assembly in March 2003, and fresh elections were held in July.

== Background ==
President Teburoro Tito was reelected in 1998, defeating Harry Tong.

== Campaign ==
Incumbent president Teburoro Tito was challenged by former cabinet secretary Taberannang Timeon.

The existence of a Chinese satellite-tracking facility in Kiribati was a key issue in the election. During his presidency, Tito worked with China to establish the facility in the Kiribati capital Tarawa. Two members of the opposition, former presidential candidate Harry Tong and his brother Anote Tong, criticised Tito for the agreement. Harry Tong requested information about the lease, but Tito denied the request. Tito found himself under further scrutiny when Chinese ambassador Ma Shuxue said that China had donated $2,850 to a Tito-affiliated cooperative society.

== Results ==
Although there were more than two candidates, only the leading two received a significant portion of the vote and no spoiler effect took place.

Candidate	Votes	%
Teburoro Tito	14,160	50.35
Taberannang Timeon	13,613	48.41
Bakeua Bakeua Tekita	348	1.24
Total	28,121	100.00
Source: Psephos

== Aftermath ==
The Chinese satellite-tracking facility was still an issue after the election. It culminated in a motion of no confidence in March that dissolved Tito's government with 40 votes in favour and 21 opposed. New parliamentary elections were held in May, and Tito's government maintained control of the House of Assembly with 24 of the 40 seats.

Another presidential election was held in July, and Anote Tong defeated his brother Harry Tong. Anote Tong was reelected in 2007 and 2011 for the legal maximum of three terms.
