= Harry Tong =

I-Kiribati politician

Harry Tong (simplified Chinese: 汤哈利; traditional Chinese: 湯哈利; pinyin: Tāng Hālì), is an I-Kiribati politician with Chinese heritage.

He was first elected to the House of Assembly of Kiribati in 1983, representing the constituency of South Tarawa, the country's capital. He was re-elected in 1987, but resigned from Parliament in 1989, before the end of his term. He returned to Parliament in the 1998 election, and was re-elected in 2003 and in 2007, still representing South Tarawa. Again, however, he resigned before the end of the latter term.

He stood for president in the 1998 election, lost to the incumbent, Teburoro Tito, and became Leader of the Opposition. He was not able to take part in the February 2003 Presidential Election, as his party selected Taberannang Timeon to stand in his place. Tito was re-elected. Shortly thereafter, Tong questioned President Tito about the lease deal which enabled the People's Republic of China to maintain a satellite-tracking facility on Tarawa. (See: Sino-Pacific relations.) Tong emphasised that Chinese ambassador Ma Shuxue had admitted having donated €2,000 to a "cooperative society linked to Tito". The resulting controversy brought down the President's newly elected government through a vote of no confidence in Parliament. Tong stood in the ensuing July 2003 Presidential Election, representing the Protect the Maneaba party, but came second to his younger brother Anote Tong, of the Pillars of Truth party. The brothers received 43.5 and 47.4% of the vote respectively - 12,457 votes to 13,556. The campaign was contentious, with Anote accusing Harry of "womanising".

The 2007 Presidential election was controversial. Candidates for the presidency are selected by Parliament, and Harry Tong did not receive parliamentary nomination; nor did any member of the Protect the Maneaba party, despite it being the main opposition party. Anote Tong was re-elected.

Unlike his younger brother Anote, who as president has emphasised the need to adapt to climate change, and who has warned that Kiribati may disappear beneath the seas altogether, Harry Tong has stated that the ocean will never rise to a critical level in Kiribati, citing his religious beliefs: "God promised Noah there would not be another flood after the last one".

As of June 2009, Tong was the leader of the National Progressive Party. He was a "key Opposition MP" in the Ninth Parliament. He resigned from parliament in January 2010 to resume his medical career.
