= Vincent Tong (politician) =

I-Kiribati politician

Vincent Tong is a Kiribati politician and the elder son of Anote Tong, the President of Kiribati from 2003 to 2016.

When his father stepped down from politics after serving as president for 12 years, Tong ran for his seat in the Maiana constituency, but was not elected. In the following elections, Tong was elected to the Maneaba ni Maungatabu seat which he had contested four years earlier. He is a member of the Boutokaan Kiribati Moa opposition party.
