= Beniamina Tinga =

I-Kiribati politician

Beniamina Tinga is an I-Kiribati former politician. He was Minister of Finance from 1994 to 2003. Tinga was sworn in as the vice president of Kiribati on 17 November 2000, following the death of his predecessor, Tewareka Tentoa, earlier in the month. He served as the vice president under President Teburoro Tito until 2003.

Tinga is from Nikunau. He is the father of 2012 presidential candidate, Rimeta Beniamina.
