= Tewareka Tentoa =

I-Kiribati politician

Tewareka Tentoa (died November 3, 2000) was an I-Kiribati politician who served as the vice president of Kiribati for two terms from 1994 to 2000 under President Teburoro Tito. Tentoa was from Onotoa in the Gilbert Islands.

Tentoa died in office on November 3, 2000, during his second term as vice president. He was succeeded by Beniamina Tinga on November 17, 2000.
