= Teima Onorio =

I-Kiribati politician

Teimwa Onorio
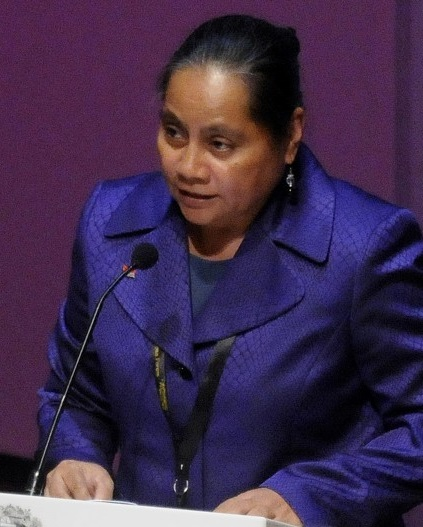
- Onorio in 2014

5th Vice President of Kiribati
- In office 10 July 2003 – 12 March 2016
- President: Anote Tong
- Preceded by: Beniamina Tinga
- Succeeded by: Kourabi Nenem

Minister for Internal and Social Affairs
- In office 2012–2016

Minister for Education, Youth and Sports Development
- In office 2003–2007
- In office 2008–2012

Minister for Commerce, Industry and Cooperatives
- In office 2007–2008

Member of the House of Assembly
- Incumbent
- Assumed office 1998
- Constituency: Arorae

Personal details
- Born: 1963 (age 62–63)
- Party: Pillars of Truth
- Education: Victoria University of Wellington (BA); University of East Anglia (MA)

Teima Onorio (also as Teimwa) (born 1963) is an I-Kiribati politician who has been a Member of the House of Assembly since 1998. She served as the vice president of Kiribati from 2003 to 2016.

== Early life ==
Onorio is the daughter of Rota Onorio, president of Council of State and acting President of Kiribati from 10 December 1982 until 18 February 1983. She was educated at Victoria University of Wellington (BA) and the University of East Anglia (MA, 1990).

== Career ==
Onorio served as Member of Parliament for the Arorae constituency from 1998 to 2002. She has also held the post of Minister for Internal and Social Affairs since 2012. She was Minister for Education, Youth and Sports Development from 2003 to 2007, before heading the Ministry of Commerce, Industry and Cooperatives from 2007 to 2008 and then returning to Education, Youth and Sports Development from 2008 to 2012.

As Vice-President of Kiribati, she has represented the Alliance of Small Island States at the United Nations, speaking on the topic of climate change.

President Anote Tong reappointed Onorio to a third consecutive term as Vice President on 19 January 2012, as part of his cabinet appointees.

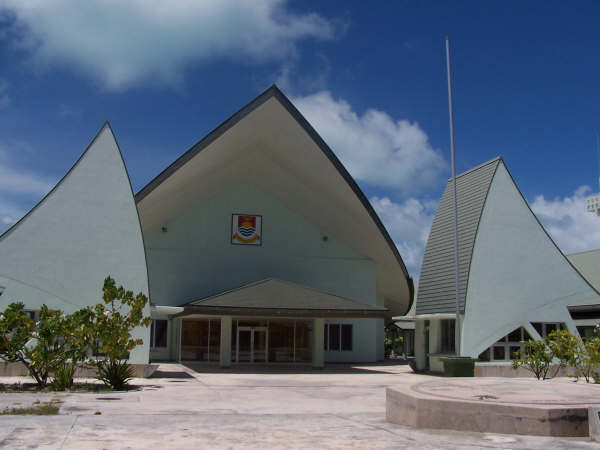
House of Assembly in South Tarawa
