= Maiana =

Atoll in Gilbert Islands, Kiribati

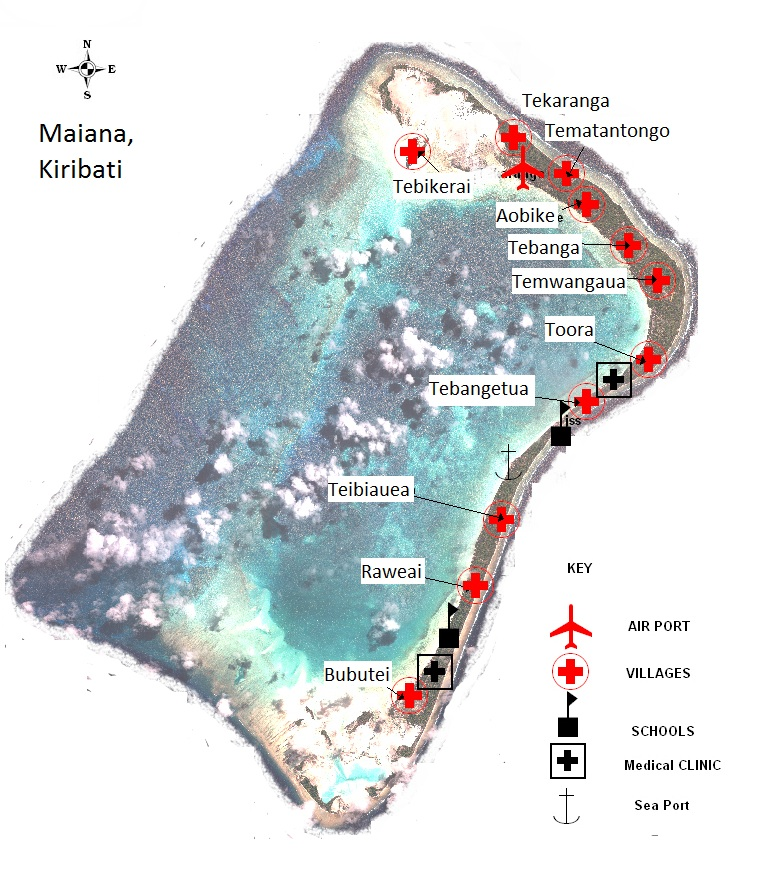
- Map of Maiana

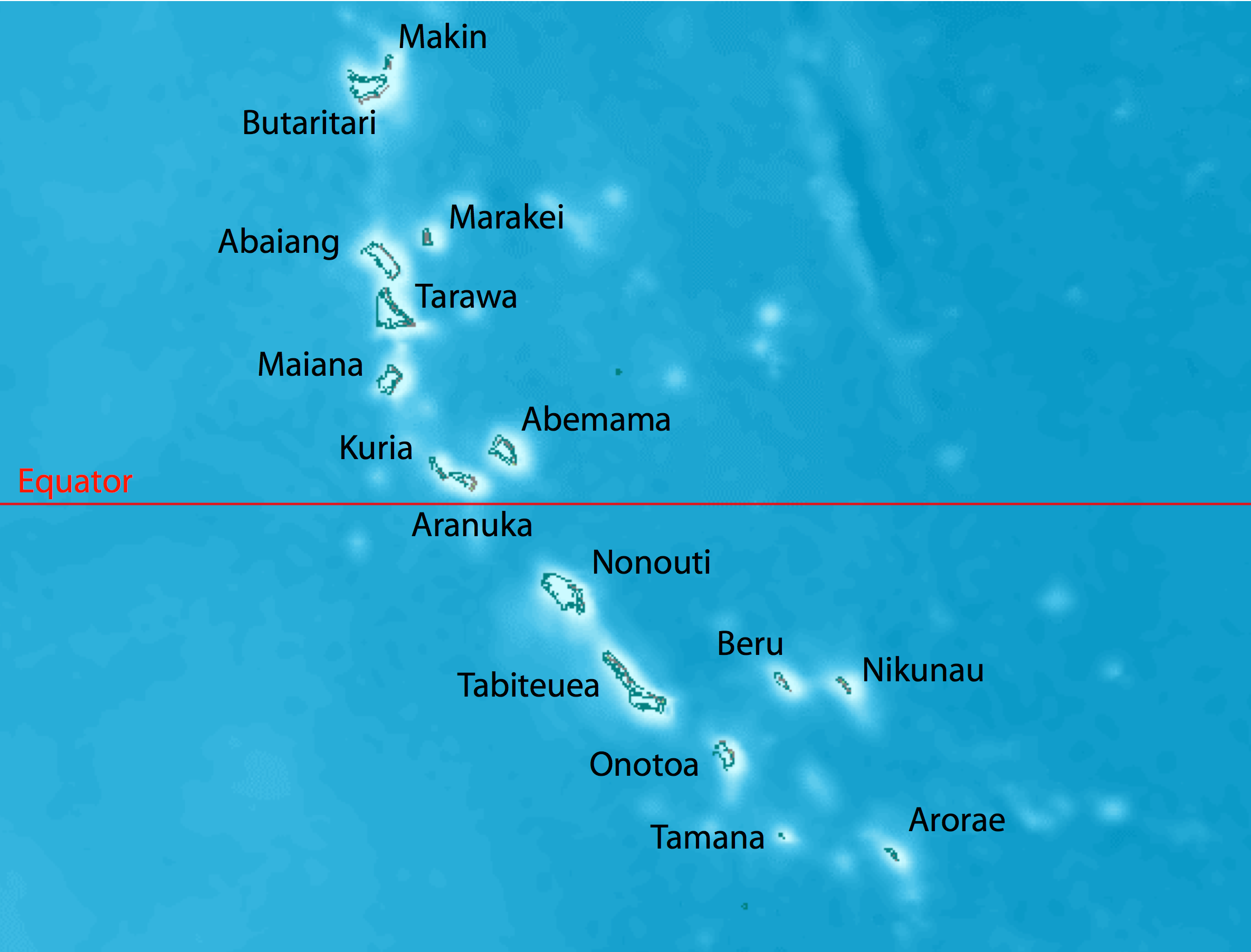

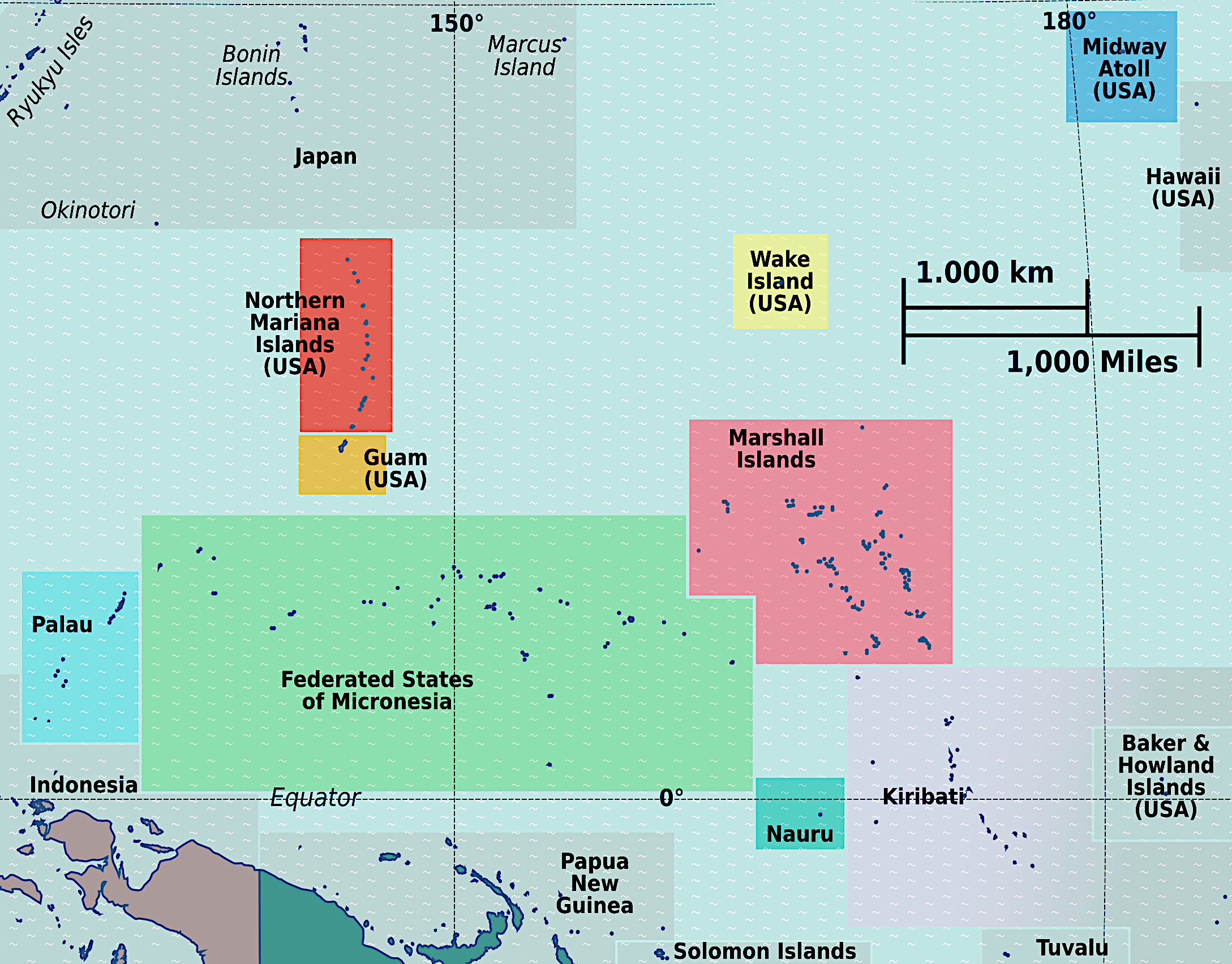
- Location within Kiribati Location within Micronesia Location within Oceania Location within Pacific Ocean

Geography
- Location: Pacific Ocean
- Coordinates: 0°56′N 173°00′E
- Archipelago: Gilbert Islands
- Area: 16.72 km^{2} (6.46 sq mi)
- Highest elevation: 3 m (10 ft)

Administration
- Kiribati

Demographics
- Population: 1,982 (2015 Census)
- Pop. density: 121/km^{2} (313/sq mi)
- Ethnic groups: I-Kiribati 99.9%

Maiana is an atoll in Kiribati and is one of the Central Gilbert Islands. Maiana is 44 kilometres (27 mi) south of the capital island of South Tarawa and has a population of 1,982 as of 2015. The northern and eastern sides of the atoll are a single island, whilst the western edge consists of submerged reefs and many uninhabited islets, all surrounding a lagoon. The atoll is 14 kilometres (8.7 mi) long and is very narrow, with an average width of less than 1 kilometre (0.62 mi) and a total land area (including uninhabited islets) of 16.72 square kilometres (6.46 mi^{2}).

== Geography ==
Most of the 2,027 people who live on Maiana live on the main island; the largest village is Bubutei, at the southern tip of the main island, which is home to 489 people or almost a quarter (24%) of the island's total population. The population of Maiana is roughly stable and has been around 2,000 people since 1985.

Maiana: Population and Land Area
Census Area	Population 2010	Land area by islet	Density (people per acre)
Tebikerai	93	61.2 acres (25 ha)	1.5
Tebiauea	211	3,805.6 acres (1,540 ha)	0.5
Raweai	214	3,805.6 acres (1,540 ha)	0.5
Bubutei	489	3,805.6 acres (1,540 ha)	0.5
Tekaranga	139	3,805.6 acres (1,540 ha)	0.5
Tematantongo	164	3,805.6 acres (1,540 ha)	0.5
Aobike	110	3,805.6 acres (1,540 ha)	0.5
Tebanga	264	3,805.6 acres (1,540 ha)	0.5
Temwangaua	115	3,805.6 acres (1,540 ha)	0.5
Toora	115	3,805.6 acres (1,540 ha)	0.5
Tebwangetua	65	3,805.6 acres (1,540 ha)	0.5
Teitai	48	3,805.6 acres (1,540 ha)	0.5
Uninhabited islets	0	263.5 acres (107 ha)	0
Maiana total	2,027	4,130.3 acres (1,671 ha)	0.5

=== Climate change ===
Many parts of Maiana suffer from coastal erosion, with the villages of Tekaranga and Tematantongo being particularly affected. Drought is another serious concern as the island's limited freshwater supply comes entirely from the shallow freshwater lens, which becomes salty close to the coast especially during drought periods. Like all of the atolls of Kiribati, Maiana is at serious risk from sea level rise, as even small changes in sea level can cause accelerated erosion and threaten infrastructure, agriculture and water supplies.

== Administration ==
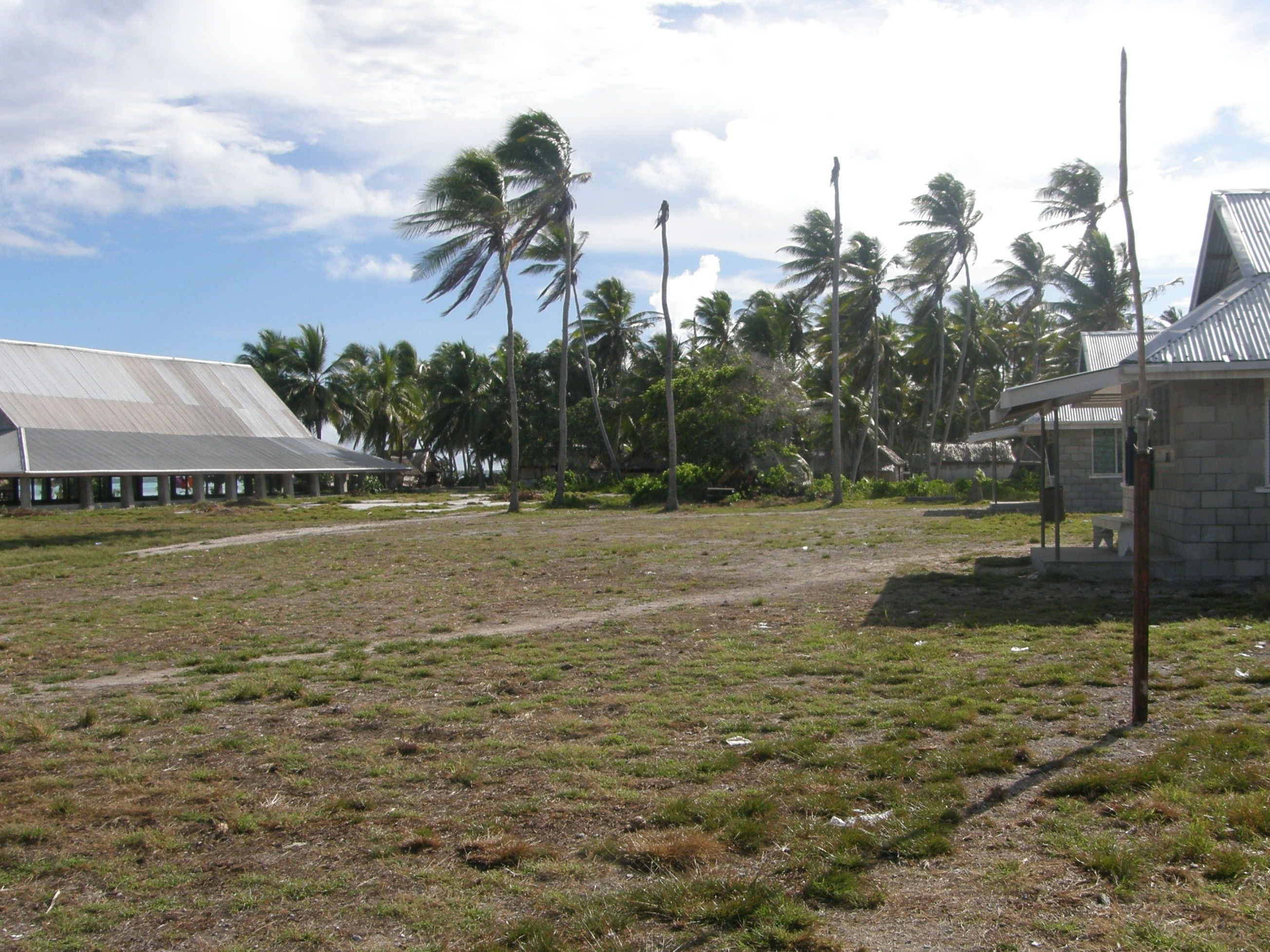
The Island Council compound in Maiana, Kiribati

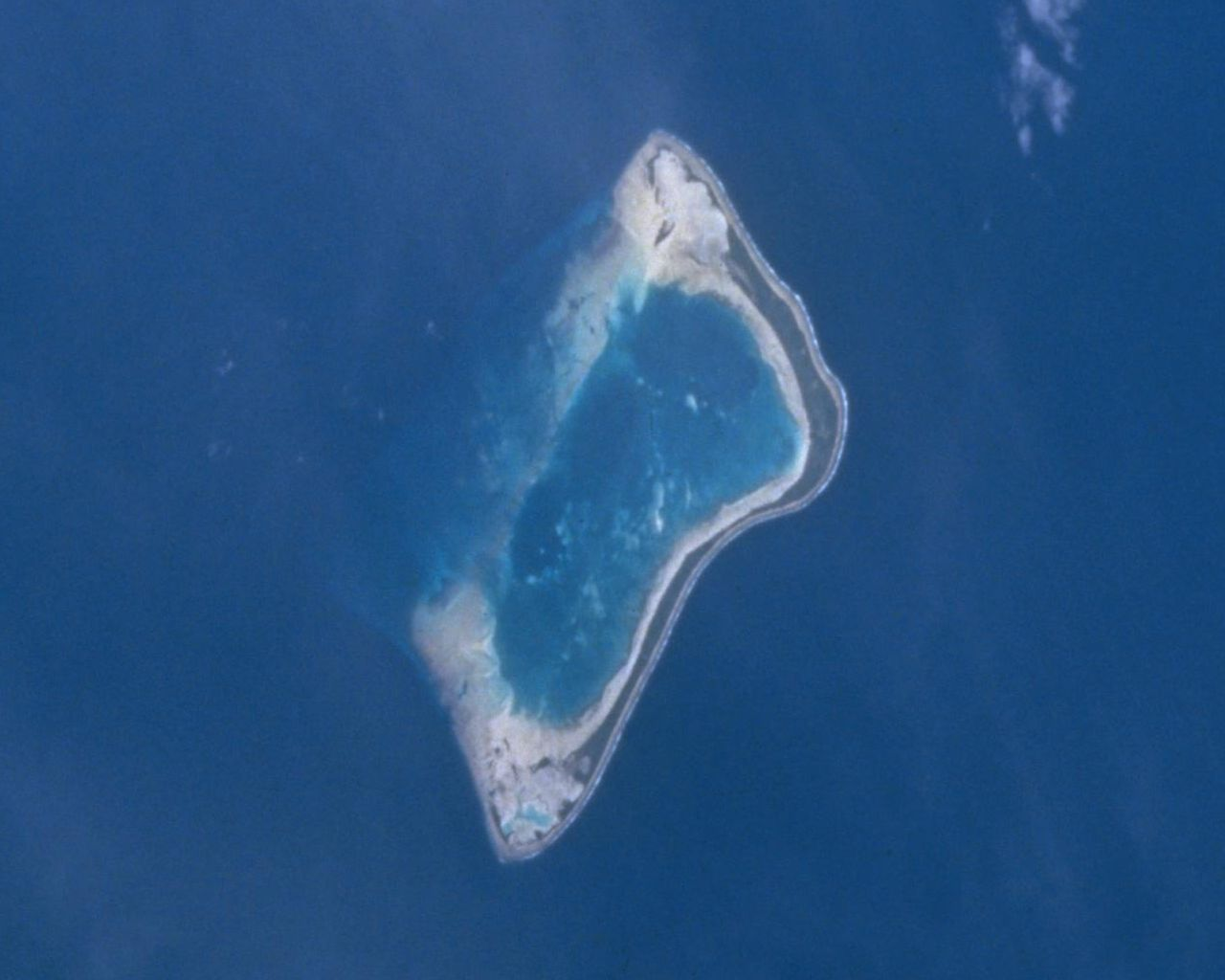
Maiana Atoll

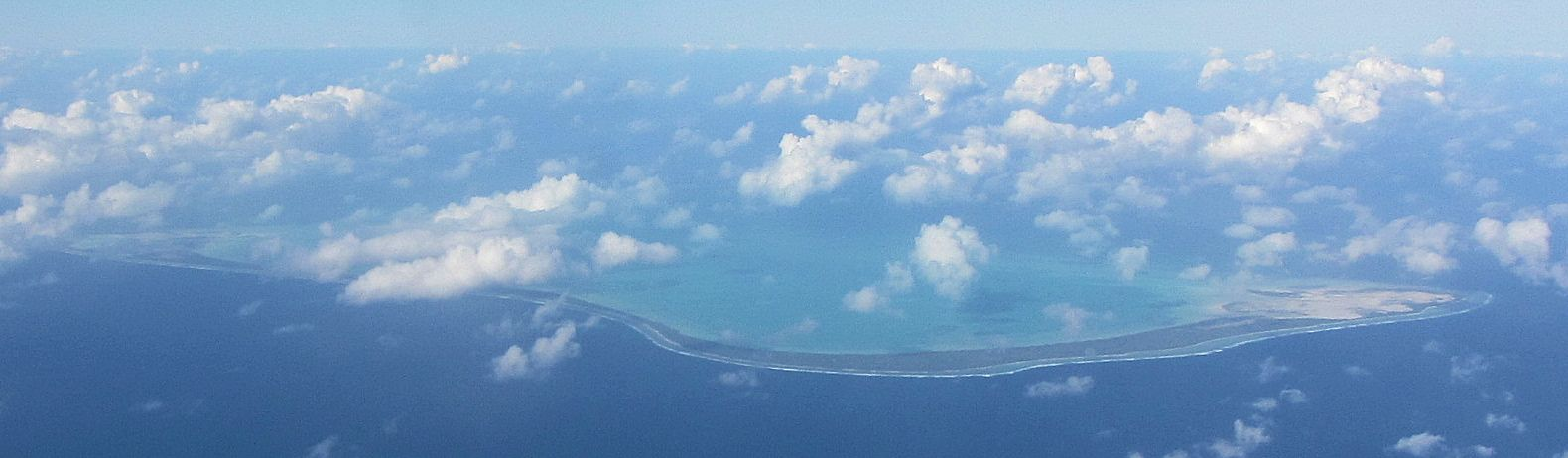
View from the air

Maiana is administered by an Island Council based in Tebangetua village. The Maiana constituency elects two representatives to the national House of Assembly in the capital of South Tarawa. Until you 2016, the MPs for Maiana are Dr. Anote Tong and Teiwaki Areieta. Dr. Tong was also the President of Kiribati. His son, Vincent Tong, is elected MP in April 2020. Apart from that, the local people of Maiana also have their ruling system that survive from the past. Unimwane Ruling System (Elders or old men ruling system). All villages from Tebikerai to Bubutei have their unimwane represent their villages to the Unimwane Council Body. This body called Tebau-ni-Maiana (The Crown of Maiana, sometimes called the most upper chamber of the Island). Among all Te Unimwane, they will choose the most aging one (older one) as their Baatua (Head of them). They execute rules of the Island that binding people together to follow. This rules and regulations based on the culture and religious belief of Maiana. For example, Uriam Kauongo was a Baatu before he died.

== Myths and legends ==
There are different stories told as to the creation of Maiana and the other islands in the Gilberts. An important legend in the culture of Maiana is that spirits who lived in a tree in Samoa migrated northward carrying branches from the tree, Te Kaintikuaba, which translates as the tree of life. It was these spirits, together with Nareau the Wise who created the islands of Tungaru (the Gilbert Islands). (Note: Sir Arthur Grimble, cadet administrative officer in the Gilberts from 1914 and resident commissioner of the Gilbert and Ellice Islands colony from 1926, recorded the myths and oral traditions of the Kiribati people. He wrote the best-sellers A Pattern of Islands (London, John Murray 1952, and Return to the Islands (1957), which was republished by Eland, London in 2011, ISBN 978-1-906011-45-1. He also wrote Tungaru Traditions: writings on the atoll culture of the Gilbert Islands, University of Hawaii Press, Honolulu, 1989, ISBN 0-8248-1217-4.)

== History ==
The island was surveyed in 1841 by the US Exploring Expedition.

Maiana Post Office opened around 1925.

In 2024, Ruta Teretia Babo became the first woman elected to represent the island at the House of Assembly of Kiribati.

== Maiana Ferry Disaster ==
On 13 July 2009, the vessel Uean Te Raoi II, owned by the Catholic Parish of Maiana and travelling from Bwairiki in Tarawa, capsized and foundered off Maiana with the loss of 35 lives.
