= Taberannang Timeon =

Kiribati politician

Taberannang “Peter” Timeon is an I-Kiribati politician, member of the Maneaba ni Maungatabu (parliament) for Tabiteuea North (last elected 2020). Until 2013, he was member of the Cabinet of Kiribati. In mid-October 2013, he has resigned from Anote Tong’s government as Minister for Communications, Transport and Tourism, having been accused of receiving an excessive allowance payment. He is re-elected during the 2020 Kiribati parliamentary election. He was candidate for the Beretitenti during the February 2003 Kiribati presidential election.
