= Pillars of Truth =

Pillars of Truth Boutokaan te Koaua
- Leader: England Iuta
- Founded: c. 2001
- Dissolved: 22 May 2020
- Split from: National Progressive Party
- Merged into: Boutokaan Kiribati Moa Party

Pillars of Truth (Gilbertese: Boutokaan te Koaua; BTK) was a political party in Kiribati. The party emerged from a split in the National Progressive Party and was one of the country's principal political groupings during the presidency of Anote Tong. In May 2020, it merged with the Kiribati First Party to form the Boutokaan Kiribati Moa Party.

== History ==
The party was formed through a split from the National Progressive Party, which had governed Kiribati following independence in 1979.

In the 2003 parliamentary election, the party won 16 of the 41 elected seats. Its presidential candidate, Anote Tong, subsequently won the presidential election with 47.4% of the vote and became president.

In the 2007 parliamentary election, held in two rounds on 22 and 30 August, the Pillars of Truth won 18 seats in the House of Assembly. The party won ten seats in the first round and a further eight in the second, while 19 independents and seven members of Protect the Maneaba were elected. Tong was re-elected president on 17 October 2007.

At the 2011 parliamentary election, 44 directly elected seats were contested. The outgoing parliament had included 18 Pillars of Truth members following the 2007 election. Tong subsequently won a third presidential term in 2012.

In the parliamentary elections held on 30 December 2015 and 7 January 2016, the Pillars of Truth remained a major parliamentary grouping. At the first sitting of the new House of Assembly in February 2016, 26 members were aligned with the party, compared with 19 members of the newly formed Tobwaan Kiribati Party.

Tong was constitutionally barred from seeking a fourth presidential term. For the 2016 Kiribati presidential election, the House of Assembly nominated Pillars of Truth members Rimeta Beniamina and Tianeti Ioane as presidential candidates, alongside Taneti Maamau of the Tobwaan Kiribati Party. Maamau won the election on 9 March 2016, ending the Pillars of Truth's period in government.

In the 2020 Kiribati parliamentary election, the Pillars of Truth, then led by former president Anote Tong, won eight seats. After the election, it merged with the Kiribati First Party, which had won seven seats, to establish the Boutokaan Kiribati Moa Party. The merger formally brought the Pillars of Truth to an end in May 2020.

== Electoral history ==
=== Parliamentary elections ===
Election	Seats	Notes
2003	16 / 41	Anote Tong subsequently elected president
2007	18 / 44	Ten seats won in the first round and eight in the second
2015–16	26 / 45	Parliamentary alignment recorded at the first sitting of the new parliament
2020	8 / 44	Merged with Kiribati First Party after the election

== Cabinet members ==
During Anote Tong's presidency, members associated with the Pillars of Truth served in the Cabinet of Kiribati. Members of the 2007–2011 cabinet included:

- Anote Tong – President of Kiribati and Minister of Foreign Affairs and Immigration
- Teima Onorio – Vice-President and Minister of Commerce, Industry and Cooperatives
- Amberoti Nikora – Minister of Internal and Social Affairs
- Iotebwa Redfern – Minister of Labour and Human Resources Development
- Tetabo Nakara – Minister of Environment, Lands and Agriculture Development
- James Taom – Minister of Education
- Natan Teewe – Minister of Finance and Economic Development
- Tawita Temoku – Minister of Line and Phoenix Islands Development
- Taberannang Timeon – Minister of Fisheries and Marine Resources Development
- Kautu Tenaua – Minister of Health and Medical Services
- Kouraiti Beniato – Minister of Public Works and Utilities
- Temate Ereateiti – Minister of Communications, Transport and Tourism Development
