= National Progressive Party (Kiribati) =

Former political party in Kiribati

- President: Harry Tong
- Ideology: Progressivism
- Political position: Left-wing

The National Progressive Party (NPP, GNPP in some sources) also known as the Kiribati Tabomoa Party, was a political party, first of the Gilbert Islands, then in Kiribati when it became the majority party in 1978, defeating the Gilbertese National Party. It was ultimately without parliamentary representation, notably after the defeat of the President Teatao Teannaki, when the party only won seven seats contrasted with the Christian democratic party which won 13 seats. Its last leader Harry Tong joined the Maneaban te Mauri before the 2003 elections.
