= Anote Tong =

4th president of Kiribati

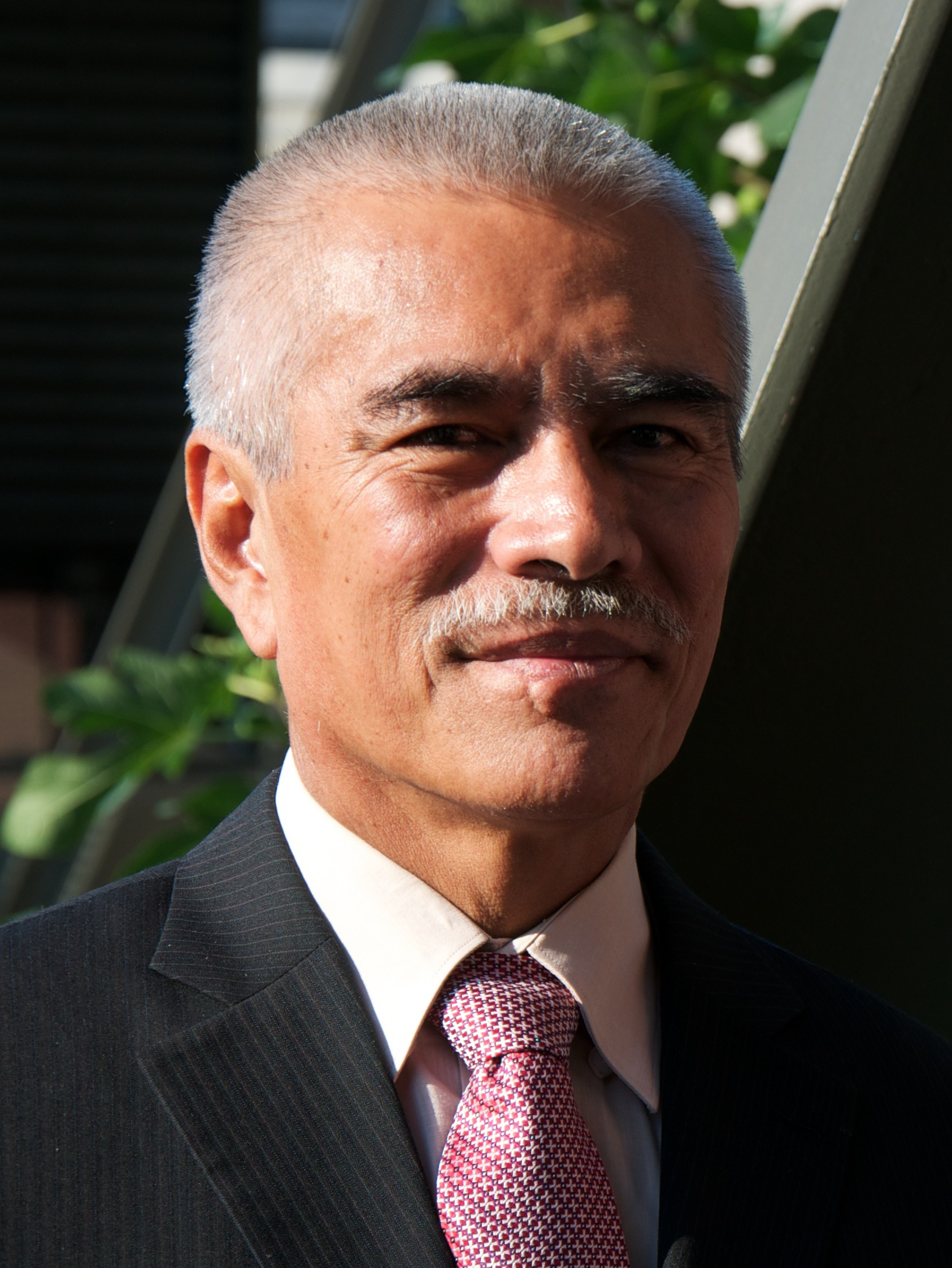
- Tong in September 2011

4th President of Kiribati
- In office 10 July 2003 – 11 March 2016
- Vice President: Teima Onorio
- Preceded by: Tion Otang (Acting)
- Succeeded by: Taneti Maamau

Personal details
- Born: 11 June 1952 (age 74) Tabuaeran, Gilbert and Ellice Islands (now Kiribati)
- Party: Pillars of Truth
- Spouse: Meme Tong
- Children: 1
- Education: University of Canterbury (BS); London School of Economics (MS)

Anote Tong (simplified Chinese: 汤安诺; traditional Chinese: 湯安諾; pinyin: Tāng Ānnuò; born 11 June 1952) is an I-Kiribati environmental activist and former politician for the Pillars of Truth party with half Chinese heritage, who served as the fourth president of Kiribati, from 2003 to 2016. He won the election in July 2003 with a slim plurality of votes cast (47.4%) against his older brother, Harry Tong (43.5%) and the private lawyer Banuera Berina (9.1%). The elections were contested by the opposition, due to allegations of electoral fraud but the High Court of Tarawa had confirmed that there was no fraud. He was re-elected on 17 October 2007 for a second term (64%). In 2012, Tong was reelected for a third term, although with a significantly smaller percentage than in the previous two elections.

Tong is primarily known abroad for his efforts to raise "global awareness on the threat posed by climate change".

== Early and personal life ==
Born in Tabuaeran, Line Islands, he is the third of six children of Tong Ting Hai, a Chinese migrant who settled in the Gilberts after World War II, and Nei Keke Randolph, from the islands of Abaiang and Maiana in Kiribati. He went to St Bede's College in New Zealand for his secondary school education, graduated from Canterbury University with a degree in Science, and then gained a Masters in Economics degree from the London School of Economics. He is married to an I-Kiribati woman, Nei Meme Tong, and has seven children, among them his elder Vincent Tong, elected MP for Maiana in 2020. Tong considers himself originally from this island of Maiana, located in central Gilbert Islands.

== Political career ==
Tong entered politics in 1976 as an assistant secretary of the Ministry of Education, then served in the Ministry of Communications and Works in the 80s. Elected in 1994, at the Maneaba ni Maungatabu, he was nominated Minister for Environment and Natural Development by Teburoro Tito, and occupied this function until March 2002. During the 2003 election campaign, he promised to review the lease of a spy and satellite tracking base used by the People's Republic of China and "to take appropriate actions at the right time." On 7 November 2003, the People's Republic of China withdrew its ambassador from the island nation, and on 29 November of the same year, ties between the two countries ceased. Kiribati established ties with Taiwan, which led the People's Republic of China to sever relations and vacate its satellite base nearly a month later.

Tong was overwhelmingly re-elected to his seat in parliament in the August 2007 parliamentary election. On 17 October 2007, he was re-elected as president by a large majority. The opposition boycotted the election due to the exclusion of two opposition candidates, including Tong's brother Harry.

Tong was re-elected to a third, and final, four-year term as president in the January 2012 election. Tong won a little over 40% of the popular vote. He defeated two challengers, including his nearest rival, Tetaua Taitai, by more than 2,000 votes. Tong reappointed Teima Onorio to a third term as Vice President of Kiribati on 19 January 2012, as part of his cabinet appointments for his third term.

He retired from politics after the Kiribati parliamentary election, 2015–16. His son, Vincent Tong, is elected MP for Maiana during 2020 Kiribati parliamentary elections.

== Post-presidency ==
In the elections of 2020, Tong told Reuters that "it was the most aggressive campaign [he] had seen" in the country's history, and that though maintaining partiality since retiring from politics in 2016, Tong opined on the switching of recognition on the One-China policy that there were "some strong feelings against China in Kiribati". In September 2022, amid the Kiribati constitutional crisis, Tong said that Kiribati was "moving towards authoritarianism", after the government withdrew from the Pacific Islands Forum and suspended all judges from its high and appellate courts, calling the moves "unprecedented".

== Issues ==
A women's rights group, the Kiribati National Council of Women, has been formed recently for the primary purpose of advocating for a proposed new government entity, one that would be the Ministry of Women and Children. A bill that among other actions would create this bureau passed through the House of Assembly of Kiribati on 23 August 2012 and reached the second round of voting, but was ultimately voted against due to a blurry outline on budgetary proportioning. After the National Council of Women voiced its discontent, President Tong stated that "the defeat was unfortunate, but it does not mean that we will not continue to support the women's issues. As a government, we will do it via other means, and perhaps it will come back to Parliament in the future." This variably leaves the door open for women's rights to become an even greater issue than it already is in Kiribati. This Ministry was finally created in October 2013.

Tong also stood front and center in the push to create the Phoenix Islands Protected Area. Due partly to this effort, Tong received in 2012 a Peter Benchley Ocean Award for "creating one of the World's largest and most biologically rich marine protected areas." He has been criticized, however, due to his hesitation in closing the preserve to fishing.

== Global advocate on climate change and environmental protection ==
Tong has been at the forefront of raising global awareness about catastrophic risks caused by climate change. With his atoll nation of Kiribati rising an average height of two meters above sea level, rising sea levels due to climate change pose an existential threat to Kiribati and other small island states in the Pacific. Tong directed Kiribati's purchase of approximately 20 square kilometers of land in Fiji in 2014 as a contingency refuge for his people. This follows advice from the IPCC following its fifth assessment that many Pacific Island states such as Kiribati could be submerged by rising sea levels within a few decades. Tong has said the purchase of land in Fiji was partly an investment in property, partly for food security purposes since it is prime farming land, but also a last resort it could be a home for the I-Kiribati people fleeing from the effects of climate change. Anote Tong, dubbed as a 'climate warrior', pioneered the notion of 'migration with dignity' to avoid the people of Kiribati from becoming 'climate refugees'.

Tong is responsible for a number of other initiatives to combat climate change and protect the environment, such as calling for a global moratorium on using coal in 2015, as well as overseeing the creation of a 480,250 square kilometer marine park, the largest protected marine area in the world. The marine park was later adopted as a UNESCO World Heritage List site (Phoenix Islands Protected Area, or PIPA).

As part of his global advocacy on climate change, Tong has met with various world leaders to discuss the plight of small island states, including Pope Francis, US President Obama and spoke recently before world leaders at the COP21 Paris meeting. Tong also currently serves on the board of Conservation International.

On 24 October 2018, he gave an interview where expressed concerns that his nation "will soon be disappearing under the sea", he also said that the Island is disappearing but that the current President Taneti Maamau refuses to act on it.

Also in October, 2018, he criticized Australia for "doing nothing" to solve the climate change issue. He was quoted as saying that: "We are being told that we may have to abandon our islands, the places where our ancestors have been buried, where our children have a home." and regretted that the United States had pulled out from the Paris Agreement.

=== Criticism of Australia and New Zealand ===
In the aftermath of the COP26 climate summit, Tong said that "one weakness in the force of our campaign [for global climate action] has been the lack of unity in purpose with the larger members of our Pacific family. It has been a huge source of disappointment for us to witness the constant changes of climate policies with the eddies of political parties in power, in both Australia and New Zealand."

== Awards ==
Tong has been awarded leadership and environmental prizes for his work both in environmental protection and his advocacy on climate change and its effects. For example, Tong was awarded the 2015 Sunhak Peace Prize, and in 2012 both the Leadership Award from the Hillary Institute of International Leadership and the Peter Benchley Ocean Award. Tong has also been awarded a number of other awards such as the Order of Brilliant Jade with Grand Cordon by the President of Taiwan (2009), and the David B. Stone Award by the New England Aquarium Foundation (2008).

== Anote Tong Foundation ==
During his term of office (2003–2016), he developed the country's commitment to climate change. He is the founder of the Phoenix Islands Protected Area, one of the world's largest marine conservation areas that has also been recorded on the UNESCO World Heritage List. Anote Tong is board member of Conservation International, and was previously an ambassador for the Global Challenges Foundation.

Political offices
Preceded by Tion Otang; Acting	President of Kiribati; 2003–2016	Succeeded by Taneti Maamau
