= List of airports in Kiribati =

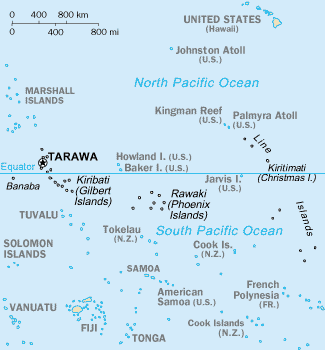
Map of Kiribati

This is a list of airports in Kiribati, sorted by location.

Kiribati, officially the Republic of Kiribati, is an island nation located in the central tropical Pacific Ocean. It is composed of 32 atolls and one raised coral island, dispersed over 3,500,000 square kilometres (1,400,000 sq mi) straddling the equator, and bordering the International Date Line to the east.

== Airports ==
Kiribati has 23 airports, of which 21 are recognised by IATA and/or ICAO. Of these, two are international airports and 20 provide scheduled domestic airline service. One airport, Hawkins Field, in Betio, has been dismantled since 1946.

=== Airports ===
Atoll	IATA	Airport name	Dom	Intl	No svc	Island group	ICAO	Longest RW ft	RW m	RW dir	STAR/APP	Fuel	Distance from TRW nm	Direction from TRW	IK schedule seq	No of airlines
Abaiang	ABF	Abaiang Airport	Yes			Gilbert Islands	NGAB						26	N	4	2
Abemama	AEA	Abemama Airport	Yes			Gilbert Islands	NGTB	4000	1220	09	GNSS	NO	67	S	9	2
Aranuka	AAK	Aranuka Airport	Yes			Gilbert Islands	NGUK	5000	1524	11/29	GNSS	NO	77	S	8	2
Arorae	AIS	Arorae Airport	Yes			Gilbert Islands	NGTR	2900	884	09	GNSS	NO	324	S	17	2
Beru Island	BEZ	Beru Airport	Yes			Gilbert Islands	NGBR						237	S	14	2
Butaritari	BBG	Butaritari Airport	Yes			Gilbert Islands	NGTU	3400	1036	06	GNSS	NO	104	N	2	2
Kuria	KUC	Kuria Airfield	Yes			Gilbert Islands	NGKT						72	S	7	2
Maiana	MNK	Maiana Airfield	Yes			Gilbert Islands	NGMA						24	S	6	2
Makin	MTK	Makin Airport	Yes			Gilbert Islands	NGMN						119	N	1	2
Marakei	MZK	Marakei Airport	Yes			Gilbert Islands	NGMK						41	N	3	2
Nikunau	NIG	Nikunau Airport	Yes			Gilbert Islands	NGNU	3400	1036	06	GNSS	NO	254	S	15	2
Nonouti	NON	Nonouti Airport	Yes			Gilbert Islands	NGTO						143	S	10	2
Onotoa	OOT	Onotoa Airport	Yes			Gilbert Islands	NGON						238	S	13	2
Tabiteuea	TBF	Tabiteuea North Airport	Yes			Gilbert Islands	NGTE	3300	1006	14	GNSS	NO	184	S	11	2
Tabiteuea	TSU	Tabiteuea South Airport	Yes			Gilbert Islands	NGTS						206	S	12	2
Tamana	TMN	Tamana Airport	Yes			Gilbert Islands	NGTM						287	S	16	2
Tarawa	TRW	Bonriki International Airport	Yes	Yes		Gilbert Islands	NGTA	6500	1981			A1	0		5	2
Kiritimati	CXI	Cassidy International Airport	Yes	Yes		Line Islands	PLCH	6800	2073	08/26	NDB, GPS,	A1	1773	E	18	1
Tabuaeran	TNV	Tabuaeran Airport	Yes			Line Islands	PLFA						1656	E	19	1
Teraina	TNQ	Teraina Airfield	Yes			Line Islands	PLWN						1600	E	20	1
Kanton Island	CIS	Canton Island Airport			YES	Phoenix Islands	PCIS									0
Kiritimati		Aeon Airfield			YES	Line Islands										0
Tarawa		Hawkins Field			YES	Gilbert Islands										0

== See also ==
- Transport in Kiribati
- List of airports by ICAO code: N#NG - Kiribati (Gilbert Islands), Tuvalu
- List of airports by ICAO code: P#PC - Kiribati (Canton Airfield, Phoenix Islands)
- List of airports by ICAO code: P#PL - Line Islands (Kiribati (eastern) and U.S. territories)
- Wikipedia: WikiProject Aviation/Airline destination lists: Oceania#Kiribati
