= Coral Sun Airways =

Airline of Kiribati

Coral Sun Airways Ltd
IATA	ICAO	Call sign
—	—	CORAL SUN
- Founded: January 2009; 17 years ago
- Hubs: Bonriki International Airport
- Fleet size: 2
- Headquarters: Tarawa, Kiribati
- Key people: Tom Sumsum, (CEO) Jeff Jong, (Chief Pilot)
- Website: www.coralsunairways.net

Coral Sun Airways is the younger of two Kiribati airlines (after flag carrier Air Kiribati), established in January 2009. The airline operated domestic service to all 17 airports in the Gilbert Islands, but stopped any regular service and offers only on-demand and chartered flights. In 2015 it purchased one new, larger aircraft, capable of flying to the Phoenix Islands and Line Islands. There was no domestic nor international service to these remote archipelagos to the east of the Gilbert Islands, having 8,800 and 20 inhabitants, respectively, except for one weekly flight on Fiji Airways between Honolulu and Kiritimati (Christmas) Island among the Line Islands, and Air Kiribati domestic flights between the Line Islands.

In January 2015, Coral Sun Airways announced their intentions to provide charter services between Kiribati and Samoa. The service will operate by way of a stop at Funafuti Airport in Tuvalu and so provide for a connection from Tuvalu to both Western Samoa and to Kiribati direct. Other routes being evaluated include New Caledonia, Tonga, Solomon Islands, Fiji and the Northern Cook Islands.

The aircraft will be a Beechcraft King Air 200 which is a pressurized aircraft with a configuration of up to 8 passenger seats, and was purchased by Coral Sun Airways in 2014. The King Air is a multi engine turbo prop which cruises at jet levels and has been one of the most popular aircraft of all time. It is the primary aircraft used by Australia's Royal Flying Doctor Service. The King Air also comes equipped with facilities to convert the aircraft into Aeromedical Evacuation configuration. In mid-2019 Coral Sun purchased its first IAI Westwind Jet with another option for two more will enter service in late October 2019.

== Domestic Destinations ==
No regular service since 2018:

- Gilbert Islands
  - Abaiang – Abaiang Airport
  - Abemama – Abemama Airport
  - Aranuka – Aranuka Airport
  - Arorae – Arorae Airport
  - Beru – Beru Airport
  - Butaritari – Butaritari Airport
  - Kuria – Kuria Airport
  - Maiana – Maiana Airport
  - Makin – Makin Airport
  - Marakei – Marakei Airport
  - Nikunau – Nikunau Airport
  - Nonouti – Nonouti Airport
  - Onotoa – Onotoa Airport
  - Tabiteuea North – Tabiteuea North Airport
  - Tabiteuea South – Tabiteuea South Airport
  - Tamana – Tamana Airport
  - Tarawa – Bonriki International Airport Hub
- Phoenix Islands and Line Islands
  - Kanton Island – Canton Island Airport
  - Kiritimati (aka Christmas Island) – Cassidy International Airport

== International Destinations ==
- Solomon Islands
  - Honiara – Honiara International Airport
- Marshall Islands
  - Majuro – Majuro International Airport
- Fiji Islands
  - Suva – Nausori Airport
  - Nadi – Nadi International Airport
- Australia
  - Cairns – Cairns International Airport

== Fleet ==
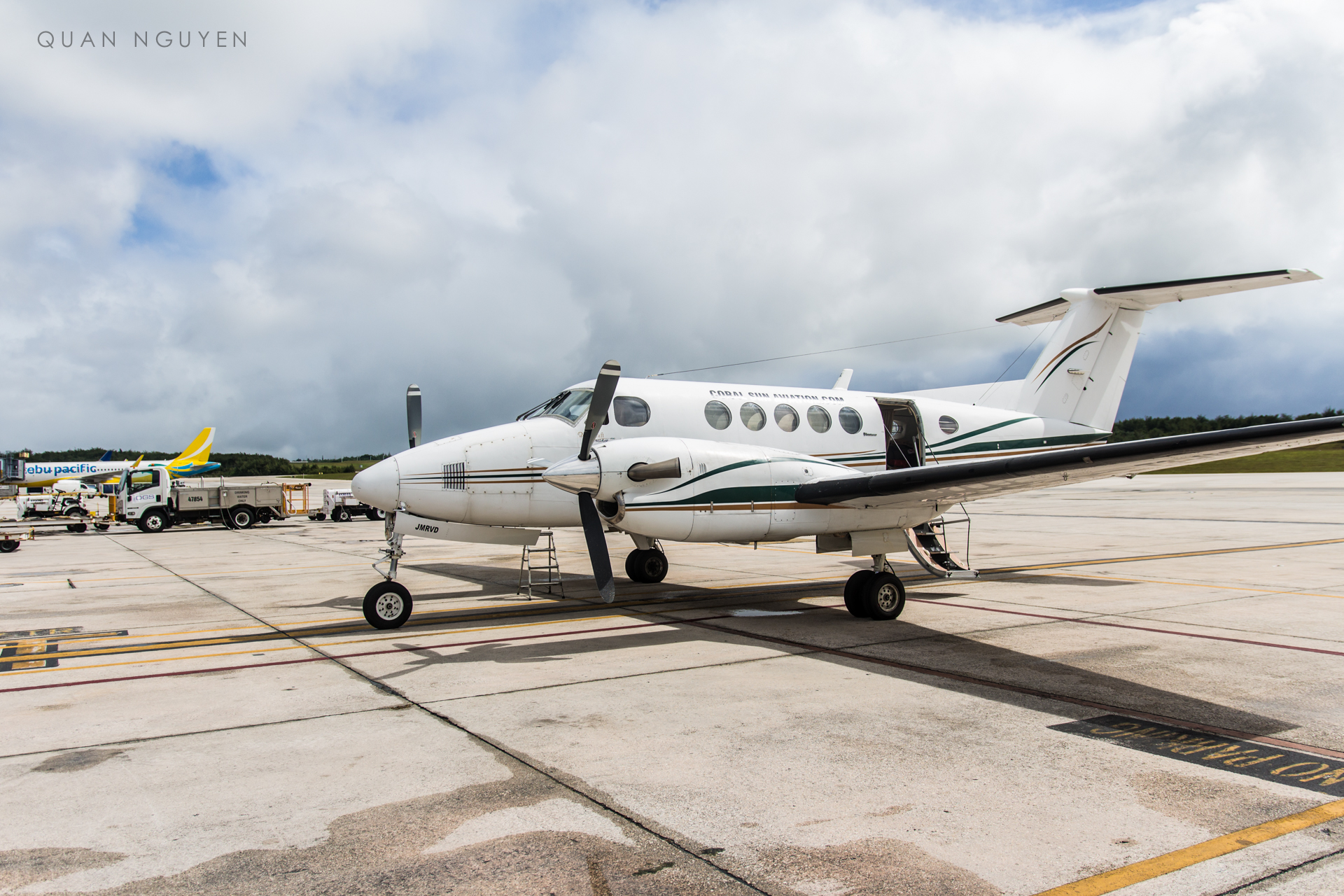
The Beechcraft King Air 200

As of 2015 Coral Sun Airways owns the following fleet of aircraft:

- 1 Beechcraft King Air 200
- 1 Piper Aztec F Model
- 3 IAI Westwind
