= Transport in Kiribati =

Transport in Kiribati is limited by the country's geography as a widely dispersed island nation in the central Pacific Ocean. The transport system consists primarily of short road networks on major atolls, domestic and international air services, and coastal and inter-island sea transport. There are no railways, and most travel between islands relies on ships or aircraft, with Tarawa and Kiritimati serving as the main transport hubs.

== Roadways ==
There are 670 km of highways in Kiribati (1996 est.) of which 27 km are paved in South Tarawa (2001). The longest stretch of road travels from South Tarawa to North Tarawa.

There are no railways.

== Water transport ==
Ports and harbours include Banaba, Betio, English Harbor, and Kanton. There is a small network of canals, totaling 5 km, in the Line Islands. The Merchant marine includes the ships of the Kiribati JMR Group that operates the Coral Sea Shipping Line, which has three ships: Coral Sea number 1, Coral Sea number 2 and Coral Sea number 3. One merchant ship connects, from time to time, the Line Islands (Kiritimati, Fanning and Washington) and makes stops en route at the Phoenix Islands.

== Air travel ==
Two small aeroplanes fly out of the Gilbert Islands, except for Banaba. Beginning in January 2009, Kiribati has two domestic airlines: Air Kiribati and Coral Sun Airways. Both airlines are based in Tarawa's Bonriki International Airport and serve destinations across the Gilbert Islands only. Neither the Phoenix nor Line Islands are served by the domestic carriers. The only served airport by any airline is Cassidy International Airport on Kiritimati. Fiji's national carrier Fiji Airways provides an international service from Fiji's main airport, Nadi International Airport to Cassidy Airport as well as to Bonriki Airport. Fiji Airways currently flies a twice weekly flight from Nadi International Airport to Bonriki, Kiribati.

=== Airports ===
As of 2010, there are 23 airports in Kiribati, of which 4 have paved runways, the only international ones being Bonriki International Airport and Cassidy International Airport. Bonriki International Airport is currently undergoing an upgrade program to bring airport security up to IATA standards - this includes the construction of a fence around the entire perimeter.

== See also ==
- Kiribati
