= List of airlines of Kiribati =

This is a list of airlines currently operating in Kiribati.

Airline	Image	IATA	ICAO	Callsign	Commenced operations	Notes
Air Kiribati		4A	AKL	KIRIBATI	1995	
Coral Sun Airways				CORAL SUN	2009	

== See also ==
- List of airlines
- List of defunct airlines of Republic of Kiribati
