= OOT =

OOT or Oot may refer to:

- The Legend of Zelda: Ocarina of Time, a 1998 action-adventure game
  - The Legend of Zelda: Ocarina of Time 3D, Nintendo 3DS remake
  - The Legend of Zelda: Ocarina of Time (2026 video game), Nintendo Switch 2 remake
- Onotoa Airport, Kiribati, IATA airport code OOT
- Object-oriented technology, a computer software development paradigm
- Oot, one of the homogeneous groups divided from Zangskari language
- Oxidative Onset Temperature/Time, an approach to differential scanning calorimetry for polymers

== See also ==
- Out of Taiwan model
