= MZK =

MZK may refer to:

- Marakei Airport, the IATA code MZK
- ISO 639:mzk, the ISO 639 code for the Mambila language
