= Nikunau =

Low coral atoll in the Gilbert Islands

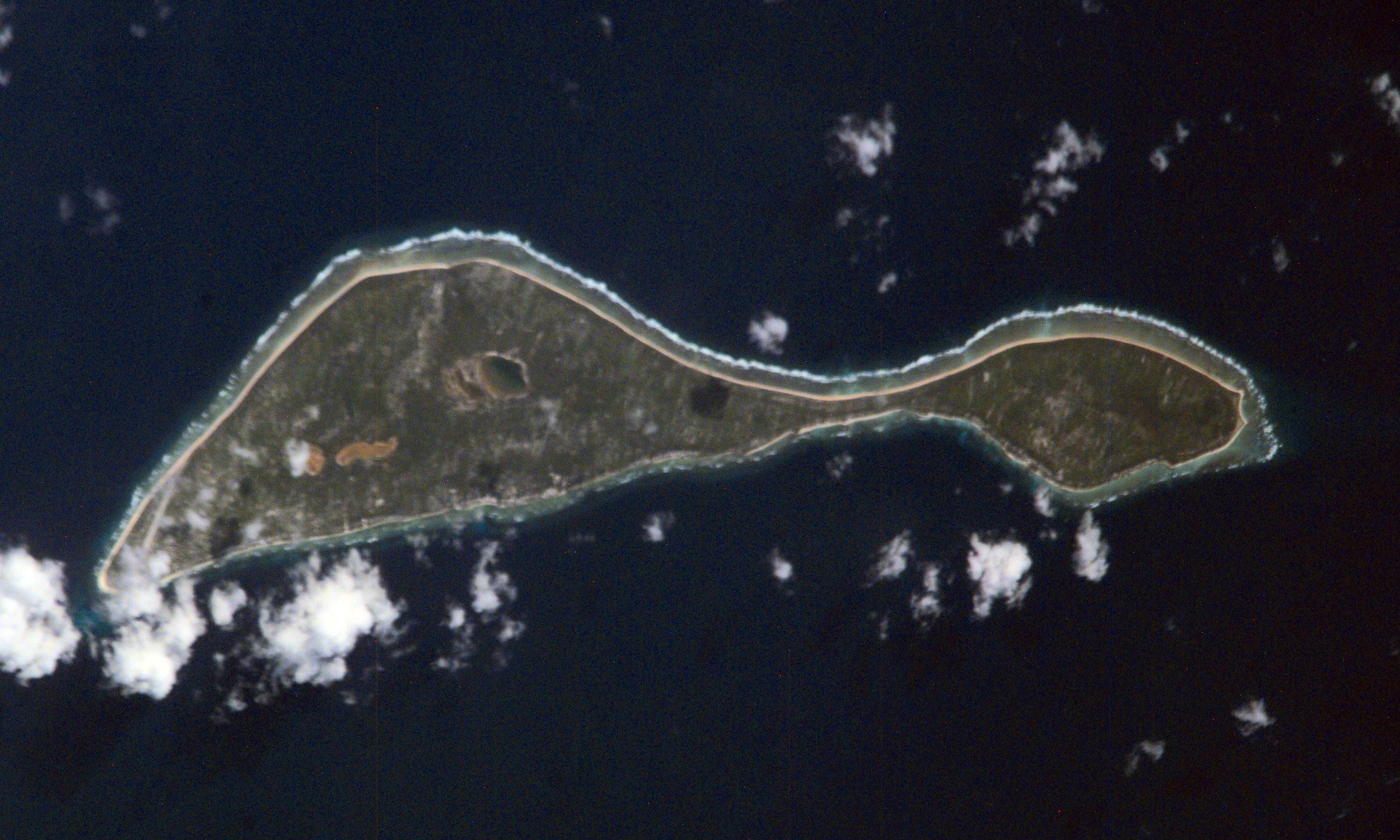
- Nikunau Atoll

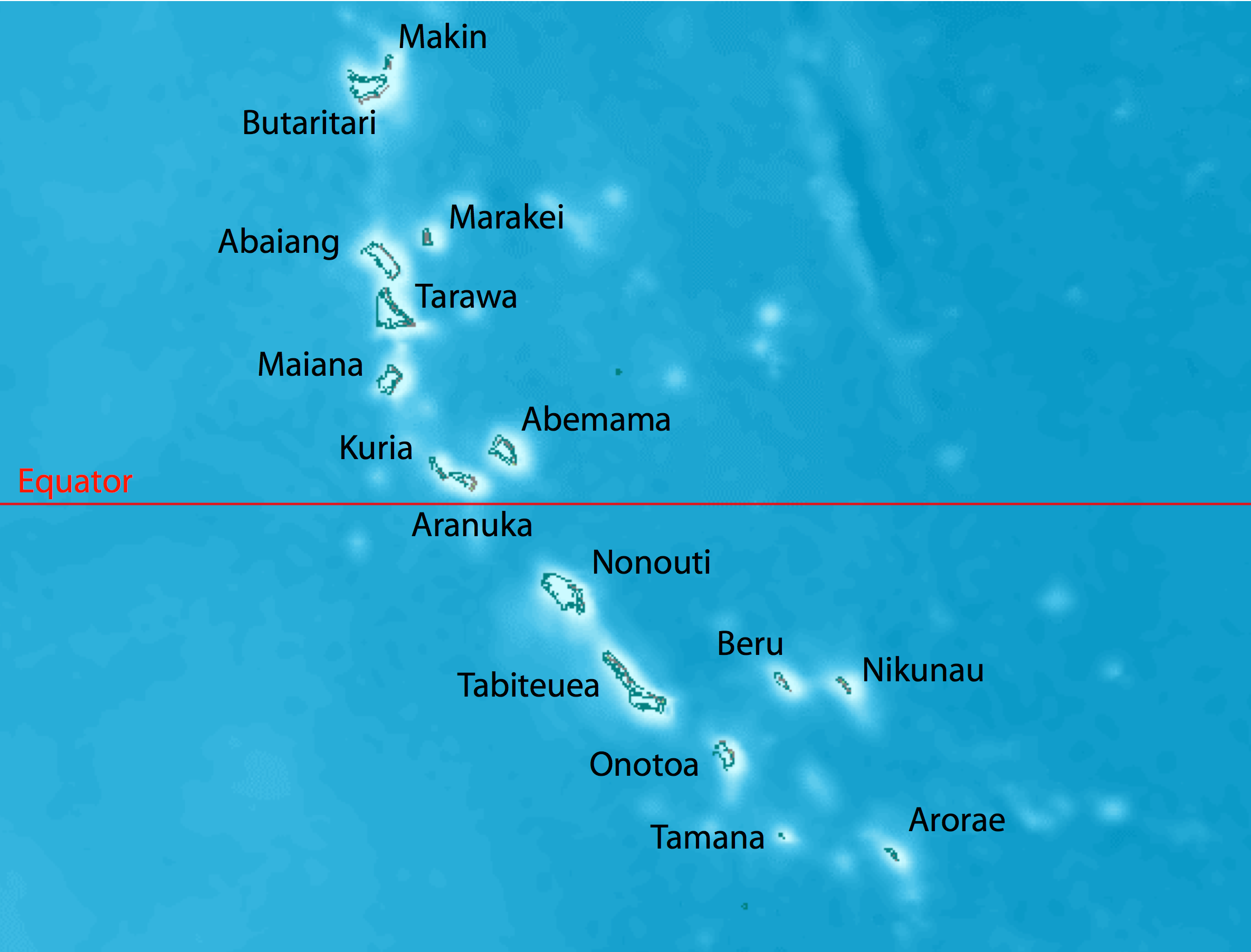

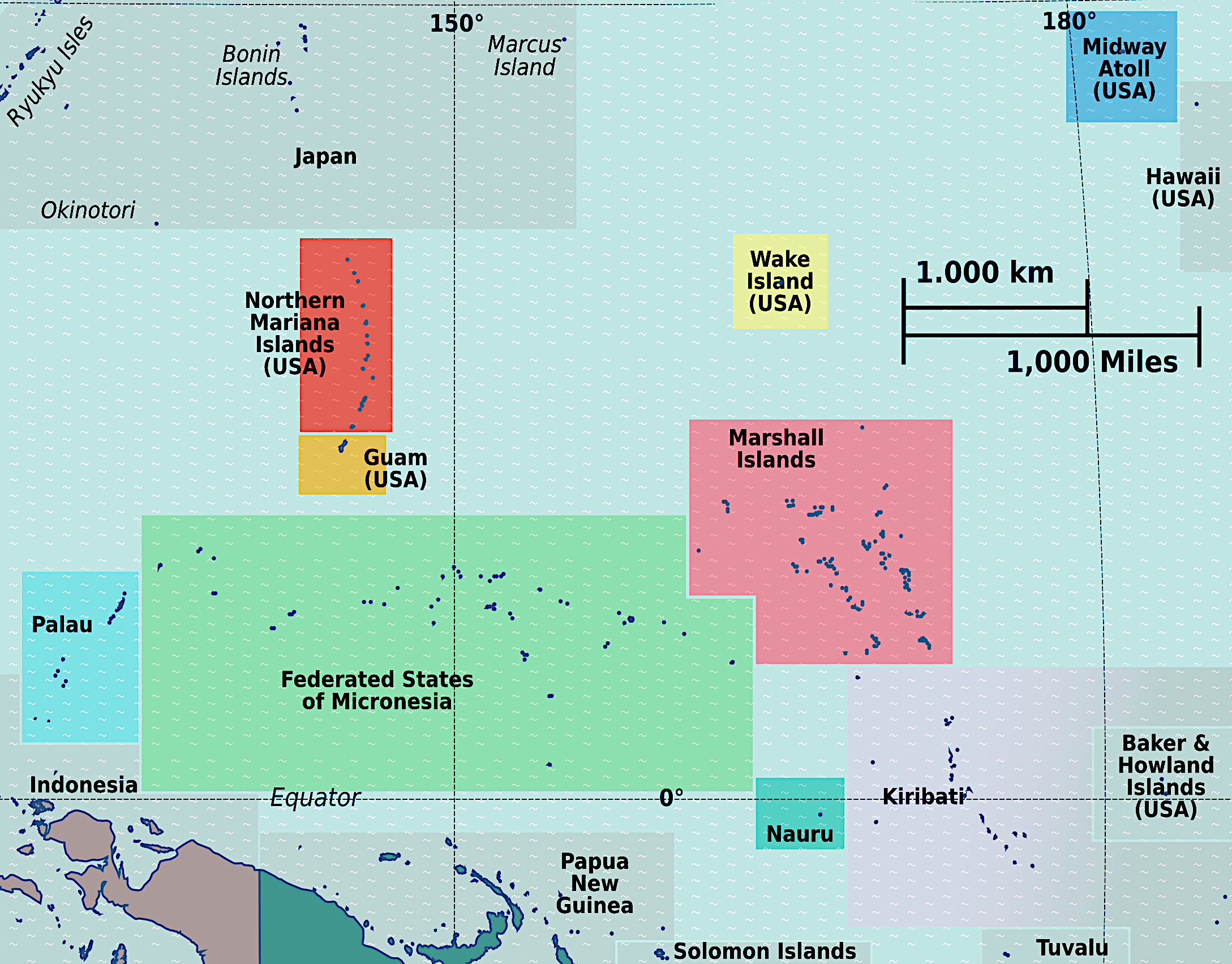
- Location within Kiribati Location within Micronesia Location within Oceania Location within Pacific Ocean

Geography
- Location: Pacific Ocean
- Coordinates: 1°21′S 176°27′E
- Archipelago: Gilbert Islands

Administration
- Kiribati
- Capital: Utiroa
- Former capital: Buariki

Demographics
- Population: 1,789 (2015 census)
- Ethnic groups: I-Kiribati 99.7%

Nikunau is a low coral atoll in the Gilbert Islands. It consists of two parts, with the larger in the northwest, joined by an isthmus about 150 metres (490 ft) wide. There are several landlocked hypersaline lagoons within the island, covering about 30 hectares (74 acres). The island is surrounded by a narrow fringing reef. Its vegetation is moderately dense and consists largely of coconut palms and pandanus.

Having been politically autonomous until the turn of the 20th century, it was incorporated into the British Colony of the Gilbert and Ellice islands, and in 1979 became part of the Republic of Kiribati. It now forms an island council of the republic.

The island's population includes 1,789 I-Nikunau people (at the most recent census). Typically, there are also a few other I-Kiribati on the atoll, working for the Republic Government or the Nikunau Island Council. From time to time the United States Peace Corps and other I-Matang volunteers have been stationed there. Other residents over the years have included castaways and beachcombers in the days of whaling and itinerant trading, Protestant Samoan pastors, traders and agents running the island's trade stores (e.g. Andrew Turner, Tom Day, Frank Even, Kum Kee, Kwong), which were turned into cooperatives in the 1930s, and Roman Catholic clergy. There is also a significant I-Nikunau diaspora, on Tarawa and outside Kiribati.

Surfing on Nikunau depends on location, but averages 2 ft to 8 ft in height. The tip of the island, close to the airstrip, is where two tides meet, creating the largest waves, and strong tides and currents.

== History ==
“as long as there is a sea and a navigator to listen to the talk of the sea, there are islands”

Nikunau's history comprises oral accounts passed down through the generations, primarily from unimane to unimane (the elderly men of each family in each generation), and committed to writings by I-Matang (pale-skinned people of European descent) since the 19th century. Significant contributors among these I-Matang are Sir Arthur Grimble and H.E. Maude, who were longtime officials of the British Colony of the Gilbert and Ellice Islands; Barrie MacDonald, a professor of history who has specialised in the history of that colony and the Republic of Kiribati that was created out of it; and Jean-Paul Latouche, who wrote down the stories of I-Nikunau unimane of the 1960s in te taetae ni Kiribati (Gilbertese language) and translated them into French. Another significant contributor is Anne Di Piazza, who carried out some archaeological digs near Rungata in the 1990s.

From these we know that the island has been inhabited since time immemorial (at least 2000 BP).. It was significant in Gilbertese political and cultural history in the extension of the mwaneaba system in about the 16th century. I-Nikunau resided in multi-dwelling dispersed settlements centred on probably six mwaneaba, which were the hub of social, political, religious, economic and cultural activities. They were organised along lines of blood, adoption and marriage into boti (tribal polity) and utu (extended family). Various laws, customs and beliefs applied political, economic and social roles and conduct, including birth, marriage, death and after-life/death, and regarding land, reef and ocean resources, and similar. While each mwaneaba district had much in common with neighbouring ones, and the same on neighbouring islands such as Beru, they were politically independent.

Commodore John Byron passed through the Ellice islands in 1765, during his circumnavigation of the globe on Dolphin (1751) in company with HMS Tamar (1758). He charted the atolls as Lagoon Islands. Commodore Byron visited Nikunau on 2 July 1765, and the island was referred to on European maps for a while as Byron's Island in his honour and I-Nikunau going away to work as whaling ships' crew were sometimes given the surname, Byron).

Nikunau was the centre of I-Matang whaling operations in the 1820s to 1860s on the On-the-Line grounds (the Line refers to the Equator).

The whalers, then the oil/copra traders, then the missionaries (the London Missionary Society and the Roman Catholic mission) and then British Colonial officials caused much change to the ways of life on the island. Trade in tobacco, tools and weapons, foodstuffs and cloth developed. Tobacco and then copra became the form of currency, with cash not really being any more significant than copra until as recently as the 1980s. Existing religious beliefs were challenged by Protestant Christianity. The gerontocracy of bygone days was challenged by Protestant theocracy. Dispersed settlements were replaced with the clustered model villages that continue today, each replete with a church and a building that resembles a mwaneaba but usually has a church connection (only one of the pre-Christian mwaneaba still stands on the entire island). Identification with boti gradually waned until it seems now redundant. However, identification with utu is still strong, as is individual holdings of rights to land use. Protestant-Catholic sectarianism has been rife but is now less in evidence, although very much still present. Pre-Christian beliefs continue. Subsistence living is still the norm but cash and trade goods can still be obtained by producing copra. The other sources of cash on the island have been and still are spending by the Colony and Republic government and its officials and public employees stationed on the island, including at the "government station" or, as it is now, the Nikunau Island Council settlement (the Council receives a grant from the Government of Kiribati to cover 80+% of its recurrent spending); and remittances received by I-Nikunau from utu working (and increasingly living permanently) overseas, elsewhere in the colony/republic and in Pacific Ocean and Rim countries and on foreign ships. These absent utu are part of a trend begun in the days of whaling, when some I-Nikunau joined ships' crews and would be seen in various parts of the world, Atlantic as well as Pacific. I-Nikunau featured in the Pacific labour trade throughout the rest of the 19th century, going to Samoa, Fiji, New South Wales, Queensland, Central America and so on, but typically returning to their island. In the 20th century that working away continued notably on the phosphate islands of Banaba (Ocean Island) and Nauru, and then on Tarawa, where government and some commerce grew slowly and then more quickly from the 1950s up to the present. Tarawa was also the main or only centre for secondary education and other highly centralised "social and economic development" and still is.

While Nikunau's population has varied little from the 1,500 to 2,200 estimated or recorded at various times since the 1800s, Tarawa's population has increased from the 3,000 - 4,000 of the 1800s first half of the 20th century to around 50,000 today. There are more I-Nikunau living on Tarawa today than on Nikunau, and many I-Nikunau living on Tarawa have yet to set foot on Nikunau. The history of this migration is associated with the aforesaid "social and economic development", notably in education, hospitals, amenities and cash employment, started by British officials such as Michael Bernacchi and V.J. Andersen, with grants from London from the Colonial Development and Welfare Fund and carried on since Kiribati independence by the Asian Development Bank and the aid arms of various foreign governments, including Australia, Japan, Korea, New Zealand, Britain, the European Union, the UNDP, the People's Republic of China and Nationalist China. This aid is continuing to have a backwash effect on Nikunau, while giving rise to increasingly undesirable environmental and social conditions for I-Nikunau living on Tarawa.

Nikunau Post Office opened around 1912, helping form the government station and now being part of the Nikunau Island Council settlement.

== Transportation ==
=== Air ===
Nikunau Airport is served by Air Kiribati from Beru Airport on Beru Island (from which the same airline flies to Tabiteuea North Airport, Tabiteuea, and from there, next to Beru, to Arorae (with the way back via Tamana), Nonouti, Tabiteuea South, Tamana (way there via Arorae) and Bonriki International Airport, Tarawa) on Mondays.
