= Beru Airport =

Airport in Beru Island, Kiribati

- IATA: BEZ; ICAO: NGBR

Summary
- Airport type: Public
- Serves: Beru Island
- Location: Beru Island
- Coordinates: 1°21′17″S 176°0′26″E
- Interactive map of Beru Airport

Runways
Direction	Length		Surface
Direction	ft	m	Surface
		950 m * 15 m

Beru Airport (IATA: BEZ, ICAO: NGBR) is the airport serving Beru Island. The island is located in the Kingsmill Group of the South Gilbert Islands in the Pacific Ocean and is part of the Republic of Kiribati.

The airport is located in the south of the island and is served by Air Kiribati and Coral Sun Airways, each of them featuring a small range of domestic destinations from Beru.

== Airlines and destinations ==
Airlines	Destinations
Air Kiribati	Nikunau, Tabiteuea North

== Sources ==
Translated from the German Wiki (2 Feb 2009)
