= Tamana Airport =

Airport in Kiribati

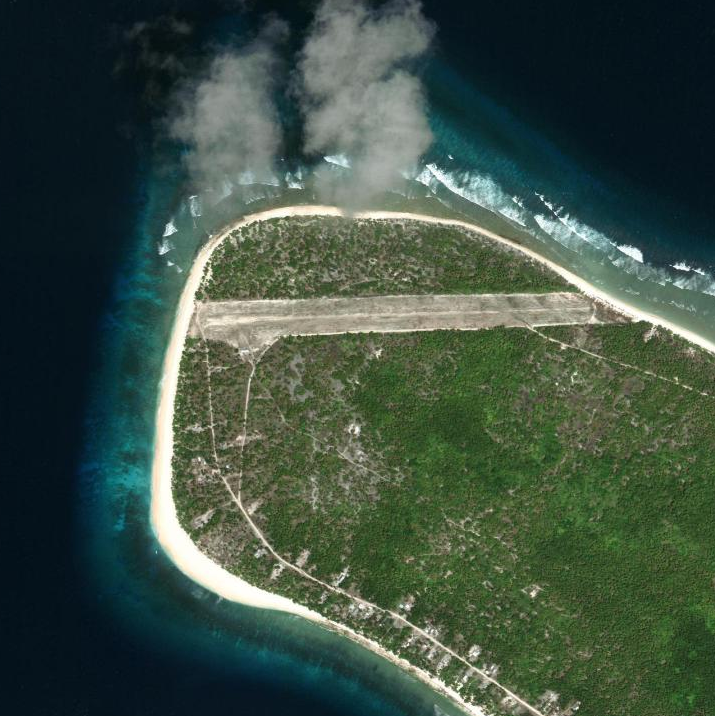
- IATA: TMN; ICAO: NGTM

Summary
- Airport type: Public
- Serves: Tamana, Kiribati
- Elevation AMSL: 6 ft (1.8 m)
- Coordinates: 2°29′09″S 175°58′12″E

Map
- Location of the airport in Kiribati

Runways
Direction	Length		Surface
Direction	ft	m	Surface
	3,000	900

Tamana Airport (IATA: TMN, ICAO: NGTM) is the airport serving Tamana, Kiribati.

The airport is served by Air Kiribati from Tabiteuea North, which is connected directly with the international airport at South Tarawa, but lands at Tamana too on its way from Arorae back to Tabiteuea North.

== Airlines and destinations ==
Airlines	Destinations
Air Kiribati	Arorae, Tabiteuea North

=== Air Kiribati connection with Tamana ===
Landing at Tamana is not a fuel stop: Since this is the only time in the week Tamana is served, passengers can get in or get out there. Thus, note that if one wants to fly from Tamana to Arorae, he cannot do anything else than make the big detour via Tabiteuea North (which lies much farther from Tamana than Arorae does), and wait a full week there, until the next flight to Arorae (because from Tabiteuea North, the plane continues its way to Bonriki International Airport).
