= Air Tungaru =

Airline, previous national flag carrier of Kiribati

IATA	ICAO	Call sign
VK	TUN	—
- Founded: 1977
- Ceased operations: 1996
- Hubs: Bonriki International Airport
- Destinations: 20
- Headquarters: South Tarawa, Kiribati

Air Tungaru was the first airline of Kiribati. As the predecessor of current Air Kiribati, it was Kiribati's national flag carrier. Air Tungaru's main base was the international airport at Kiribati's capital, South Tarawa. From there, regular service was provided to all 16 domestic airports in the Gilbert Islands.

According to its 14 June 1981, timetable, Air Tungaru initially operated a Boeing 727-100 jetliner with international service between Tarawa and Honolulu, Hawaii, United States, via a stop on Kiritimati (listed as Christmas Island in the timetable), as well as nonstop service between Tarawa and the Tuvaluan capital Funafuti, the latter service being operated with a small de Havilland Heron prop aircraft. This same timetable also lists nonstop service between Kiritimati (Christmas Island) and Papeete, Tahiti, operated in association with Union de Transports Aériens (UTA), a French airline that was eventually merged into Air France.

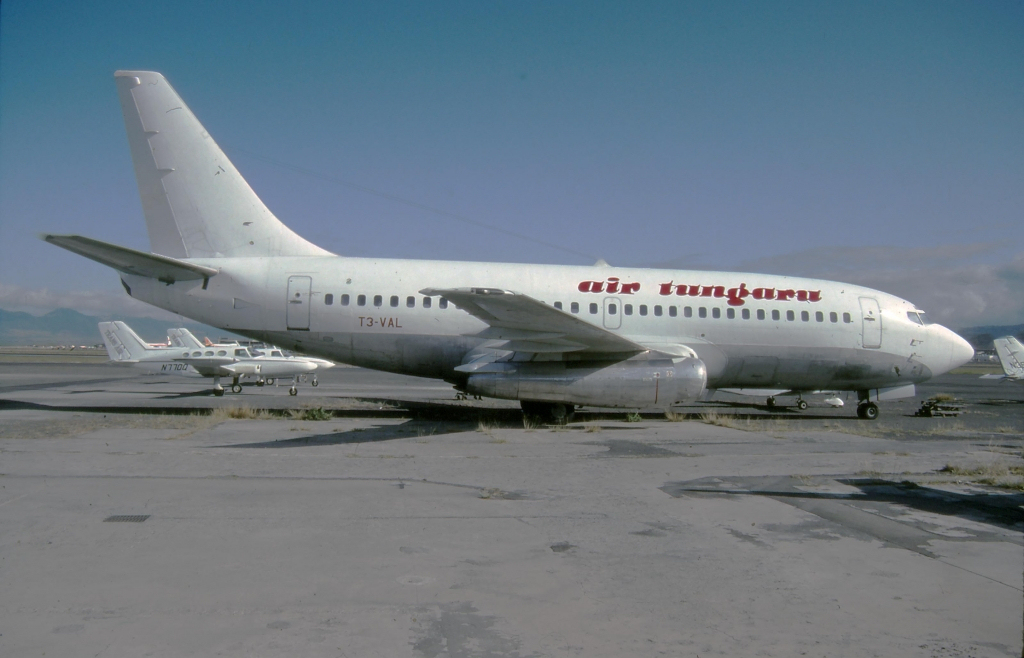
An Air Tungaru Boeing 737-200 parked at Honolulu International Airport in 1992

== Fleet ==
Air Tungaru operated the following aircraft:

Air Tungaru fleet
Aircraft	Total	Introduced	Retired	Notes
Boeing 727-100	1	1981	1984	Replaced with a Boeing 737-200
Boeing 737-200	1	1991	1993	
Britten-Norman BN-2 Islander	2	1978	1996	
CASA C-212 Aviocar	1	1982	1996	
de Havilland Heron	1	1981	1982	

== See also ==
- List of defunct airlines of Kiribati
