= Arorae Airport =

Airport in Tamaroa, Kiribati

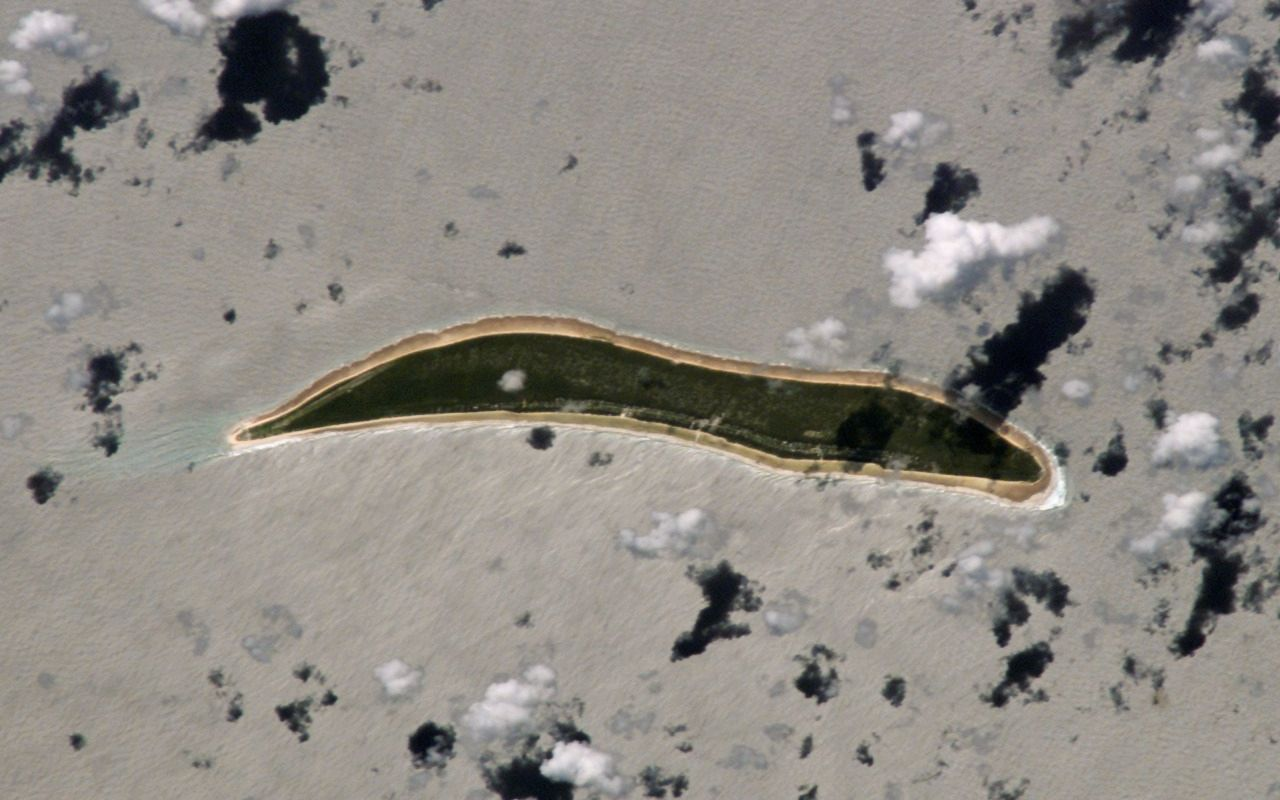
- IATA: AIS; ICAO: NGTR

Summary
- Airport type: Public
- Serves: Arorae
- Location: Tamaroa
- Elevation AMSL: 6 ft / 2 m
- Coordinates: 2°36′58.54″S 176°48′7.56″E

Map
- Location of the airport in Kiribati

Runways
Direction	Length		Surface
Direction	ft	m	Surface
	3,100	945

Arorae Airport (IATA: AIS, ICAO: NGTR) is the airport serving Arorae, Kiribati. It is located in the north of the island, north of the village of Tamaroa.

The airport is served by Air Kiribati from Tabiteuea North Airport, which is connected with the international airport at South Tarawa, but lands at Tamana on its way from Arorae back to Tabiteuea North.

== Airlines and destinations ==
Airlines	Destinations
Air Kiribati	Tabiteuea North, Tamana

=== Air Kiribati connection with Tamana ===
Landing at Tamana is not a fuel stop. Since this is the only time throughout the week Tamana is served, passengers can arrive or depart from there. Thus, if someone wants to fly from Tamana to Arorae, they must make the detour via Tabiteuea North (which lies much further from Tamana than Arorae does), and wait a full week there, until the next flight to Arorae (because from Tabiteuea North, the plane continues its way to Bonriki International Airport).
