= Roreti =

Coordinates: 2°39′S 176°50′E

- Interactive map of Roreti
- Country: Kiribati

Population
  - Total: 853

Roreti is a village in Arorae, Kiribati. The name is a local transliteration of Royalist.

There are only two villages on the island: the northern village, Tamaroa (population 426, 2010 census) and the southern village, Roreti (population 853, 2010 census). The Government station is located between the two villages at Taribo. There is a church at Roreti built in the 1870s from pure limestone rock, quarried from the bedrock of the island base when the London Missionary Society (which later became the Kiribati Protestant Church or KPC) arrived in the island.
