= Ioteba Tamuera Uriam =

Kiribati politician, musician, writer of national anthem (1910–1988)

Te Ioteba Tamuera Uriam MBE (1910 in Tamana–1988) was a politician, writer and musician of Kiribati. He was from Tamana. He wrote the Gilbertese and English lyrics and the music of the national anthem, "Kunan Kiribati".
