= Kunan Kiribati =

National anthem of Kiribati

English: Song of Kiribati
- National anthem of Kiribati
- Also known as: Teirake Kaini Kiribati (English: Stand Up, Kiribati)
- Lyrics: Ioteba Tamuera Uriam
- Music: Ioteba Tamuera Uriam
- Adopted: 12 July 1979

Audio sample
- U.S. Navy Band instrumental version (one verse): file; help

"Kunan Kiribati" (English: "Song of Kiribati"), also known by its incipit, "Teirake Kaini Kiribati" (Gilbertese pronunciation: [tei̯ɾake kaːi̯ni kiɾibæsi]; English: "Stand Up, Kiribati"), is the national anthem of Kiribati. It was written and composed by Ioteba Tamuera Uriam and adopted upon independence on 12 July 1979. Its lyrics were confirmed as per Schedule 3 of the National Identity Act 1989.

== History ==
The anthem was selected after a nationwide song competition to find a national anthem. Among those who participated in the competition were local composer and Protestant missionary Rev. Tom Toakai.

== Lyrics ==
According to the National Identity Act 1989, the piece is to be sung at an andante tempo of 108.

Gilbertese lyrics

I
Teirake kaaini Kiribati,
Anene ma te kakatonga,
Tauraoi nakon te mwioko,
Ma ni buokia aomata.
Tauaninne nte raoiroi,
Tangiria aomata nako.
Tauaninne nte raoiroi,
Tangiria aomata.

II
Reken te kabaia ma te rau,
Ibuakoia kaain abara,
Bon reken te nano ae banin,
Ma te i-tangitangiri naba.
Ma ni wakina te kabaia,
Ma n neboa i eta abara.
Ma ni wakina te kabaia,
Ma n neboa abara.

III
Ti butiko ngkoe Atuara,
Kawakinira ao kairira,
Nakon taai aika i maira,
Buokira ni baim ae akoi.
Kakabaia ara Tautaeka,
Ma ake a makuri iai.
Kakabaia ara Tautaeka,
Ma aomata ni bane.

IPA transcription (Note: See Help:IPA and Gilbertese language § Phonology.)

1
[tei̯.ɾa.ke kaːi̯.ni ki.ɾi.bæ.si]
[a.ne.ne mæ te ka.ka.to.ŋa]
[tau̯.ɾa.oi̯ na.kon te mˠi.o.ko]
[mæ ni bu.o.ki.a ao̯.mæ.ta]
[tau̯.a.nin.ne (i)n.te ɾa.oi̯.ɾoi̯]
[ta.ŋi.ɾi.a ao̯.mæ.ta na.ko]
[tau̯.a.nin.ne (i)n.te ɾa.oi̯.ɾoi̯]
[ta.ŋi.ɾi.a ao̯.mæ.ta]

2
[ɾe.ken te ka.bai̯.a mæ te ɾau̯]
[i.bu.a.koi̯.a kaː.in a.bæ.ɾa]
[bon ɾe.ken te næ.no ae̯ ba.nin]
[mæ te‿i̯.ta.ŋi.ta.ŋi.ɾi na.bæ]
[mæ ni βˠa.ki.na te ka.bai̯.a]
[mæ‿n ne.bo.a‿i̯ e.ta a.bæ.ɾa]
[mæ ni βˠa.ki.na te ka.bai̯.a]
[mæ‿n ne.bo.a a.bæ.ɾa]

3
[si bu.si.ko‿ŋkoe̯ a.tu.a.ɾa]
[ka.βˠa.ki.ni.ɾa a.o kai̯.ɾi.ɾa]
[na.kon taːi̯ ai̯.ka i ma.i.ɾa]
[bu.o.ki.ɾa ni bæi̯m ae̯ a.koi̯]
[ka.ka.bai̯.a a.ɾa tau̯.tae̯.ka]
[mæ a.ke a ma.ku.ɾi i.ai̯]
[ka.ka.bai̯.a a.ɾa tau̯.tae̯.ka]
[mæ ao̯.mæ.ta ni bæ.ne]

English lyrics

I
Stand up, people of Kiribati!
Sing with jubilation!
Prepare to accept responsibility
And to help each other!
Be steadfastly righteous!
Love all our people!
Be steadfastly righteous!
Love all our people!

II
The attainment of contentment
And peace by our people
Will be achieved
When all our hearts beat as one,
Love one another!
Promote happiness and unity!
Love one another!
Promote happiness and unity!

III
We beseech You, O God,
To protect and lead us
In the days to come.
Help us with Your loving hand.
Bless our Government
And all our people!
Bless our Government
And all our people!
