= Arorae =

Island of Kiribati

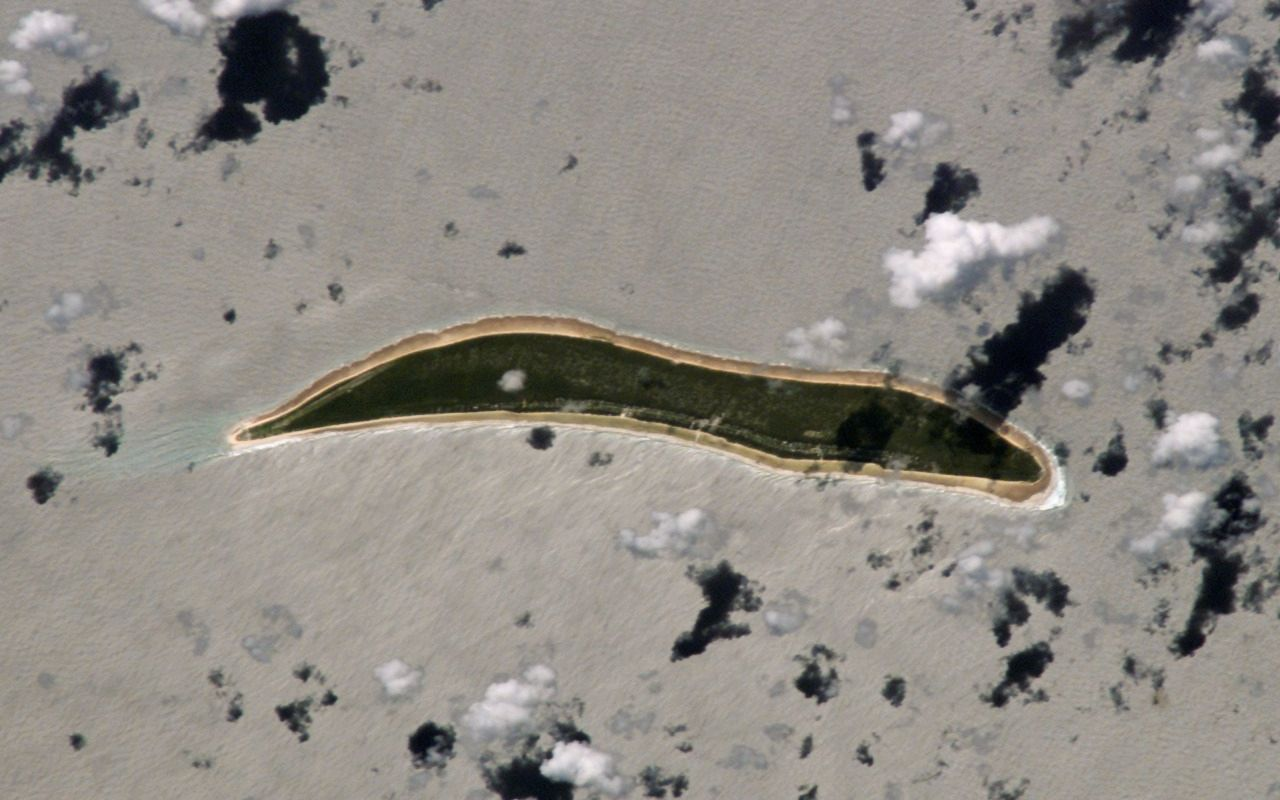
- atoll of Arorae

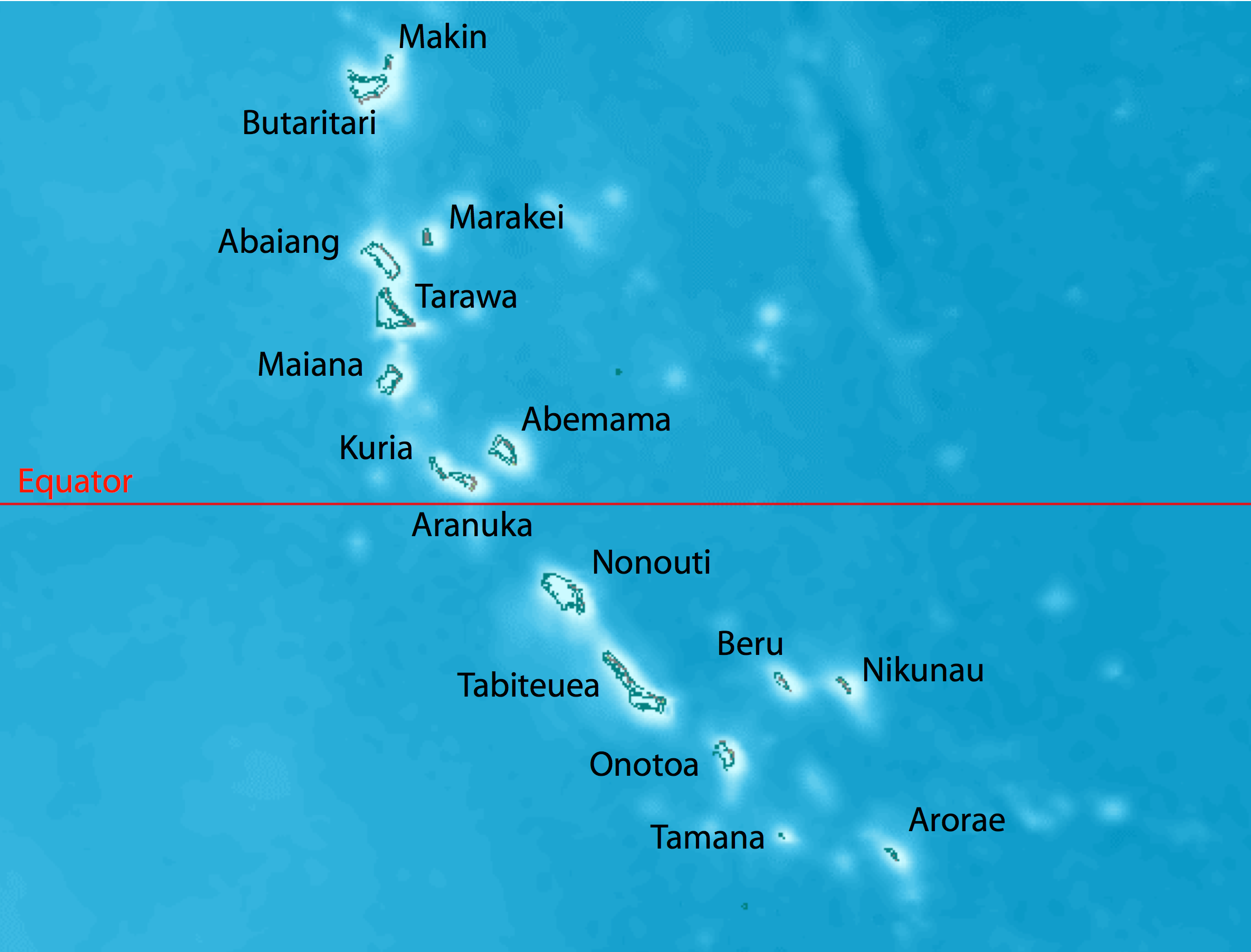

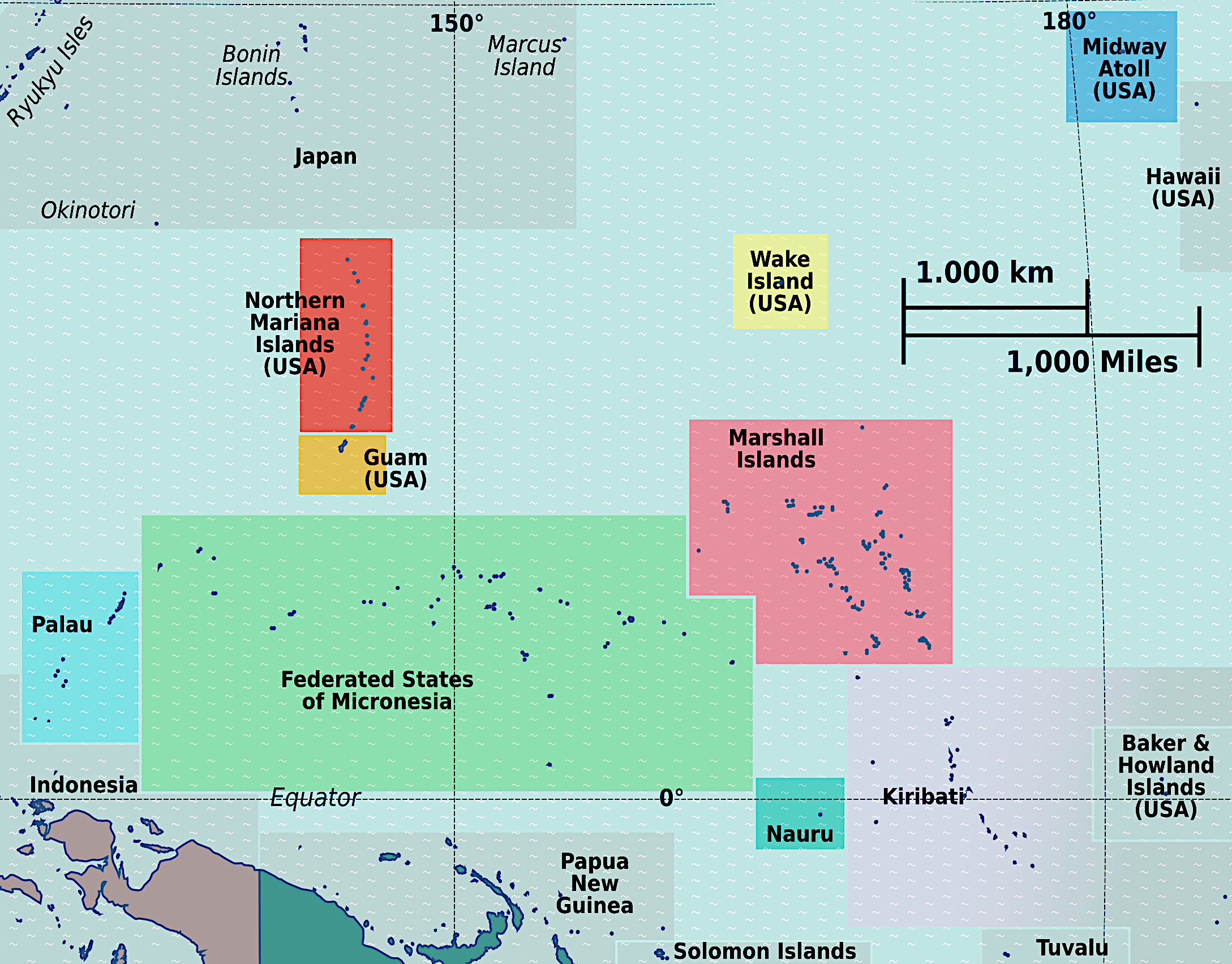
- Location within Kiribati Location within Micronesia Location within Oceania Location within Pacific Ocean

Geography
- Location: Pacific Ocean
- Coordinates: 2°38′37″S 176°49′54″E
- Archipelago: Gilbert Islands
- Area: 9.48 km^{2} (3.66 sq mi)
- Length: 9 km (5.6 mi)
- Width: 1 km (0.6 mi)
- Highest elevation: 3 m (10 ft)

Administration
- Kiribati
- Capital: Taribo
- Capital city: Arorae Island Council

Demographics
- Population: 983 (2020 Census)
- Pop. density: 107/km^{2} (277/sq mi)
- Ethnic groups: I-Kiribati 100%

Arorae (spelling variants: Arorai, Arurai; also known as Hope Island or Hurd Island) is an atoll in Kiribati located near the equator. Arorae is the southernmost island in the Gilbert Islands group. It has a population of just over a thousand inhabitants on 9.5 square kilometres.

== Geography ==
Arorae is the southernmost atoll in the Gilbert Islands, 600 km south from South Tarawa. The atoll's area is 9.48 km^{2} (3.7 sq mi). The atoll is a low and flat coralline island with an elongated shape. It is 9 km in length and 1 km wide, at its widest point. There is no lagoon, like in bigger atolls of the Gilberts.

Since the 2015 census, Arorae is the less populated island of the Republic of Kiribati but Banaba and Canton Island. The population at the November 2020 census was the lowest ever, 983 inhabitants from 208 households. The population at the previous 2015 census was 1,011, most of whom (98.5%) are Protestants of Kiribati Uniting Church (KUC) and all of them are I-Kiribati (no declared mixed races or others). During the 2010 census, there were only 2 foreign citizens. In the Republic of Kiribati, 25% of the people identifying as “from Arorae” (4,190) live in Arorae: 1,061 live in Arorae, 2,142 live in South Tarawa and 987 in outer islands. 216 people living in Arorae are not “from Arorae” (2010). At the first census after WWII, in 1947, 1,558 people lived in Arorae; in 1963, 1,760; in 1968, 1,830, the highest population ever; in 1973, 1,626; in 1978, 1,527; in 1985, 1,470; in 1990, 1,440; in 1995, 1,248; in 2000, 1,225; in 2005, 1,256; in 2010, 1,279 — 134 h/km2.

There were 238 households with 5.3 people average in each household (2010 census). Arorae has a large elderly population compared to the rest of Kiribati (12% over 60).

There are only two villages on the island, Tamaroa, the northern village and Roreti (a local transliteration of "Royalist"), the southern village. The government station, with Island Council, schools and services, is located midway, between the two villages, at Taribo. Each village has its KUC church at the centre, the most notable infrastructural features on the atoll, at Tamaroa and Roreti. These churches were built from pure limestone rock hacked from the island base itself in the early 1870s during the initial establishment of Christianity on the island by the London Missionary Society, which later became the Kiribati Protestant Church (KPC), nowadays KUC.

The households are arranged along the road in an orderly way, quite close together at the roadside.

- Tamaroa (population 356, 2015 census)
- Roreti (population 655, 2015 census)

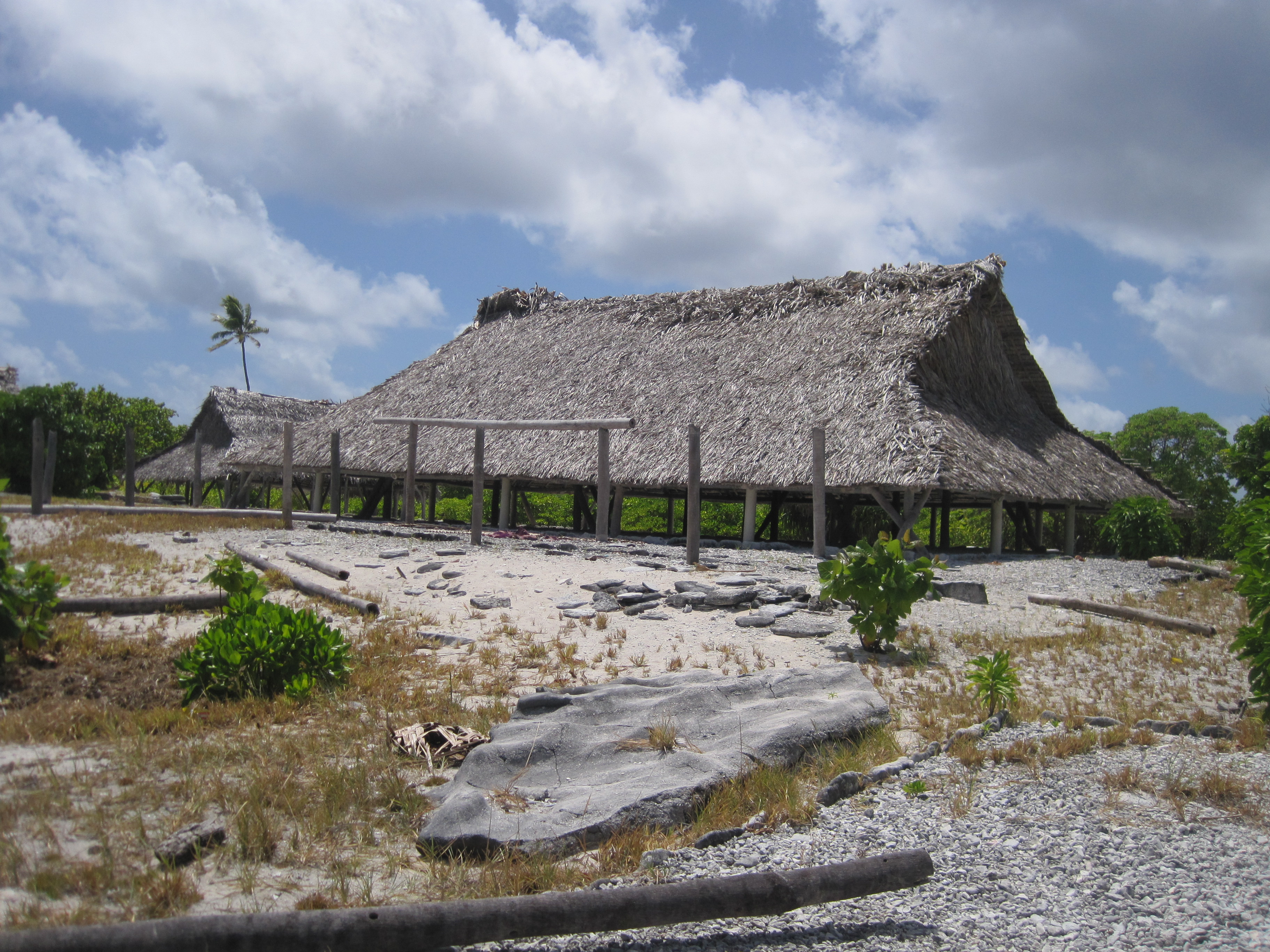
Maneaba in the North

== History ==
Arorae was first sighted in 1809 by Captain John Patterson of the British vessel, Elizabeth and called Hope Island. For the Kanakas, the years of blackbirding in the mid-19th century came slowly to an end in the 1870s upon the arrival of the London Missionary Society missionaries from Samoa, who were able to give some protection against the blackbirders. The Pacific Islanders Protection Acts of 1872 and 1875 provided for agents on British recruiting vessels, stricter licensing procedures, and patrol of British-controlled islands. These acts reduced the incidence of blackbirding by British subjects, but because of the continuing heavy demand for labour in Queensland the practice continued.

The village Royalist (Roreti – local rendition for Royalist) was named after Captain Davis warship, HMS Royalist, that carried out the proclamation of the Gilbert Islands as a British protectorate in 1892.

Arorae Post Office opened around 1923.

== Culture ==
Arorae culture has been influenced by Samoa more than most of the other atolls in the Gilbert Islands (Kiribati). This is because Samoan missionaries from Upolu settled there and converted the island's residents to the Protestant Church. The Samoan presence in Arorae shaped their style of dancing, making Arorae known for the "taubati", a dance using claps, slaps, and stomps as visual percussion to accompany local songs.

Because it is a more remote outer-island within the Gilbert line of the Republic of Kiribati, it is known for maintaining a more traditional culture held together mostly under the authority of "unimwane" (village elders).

Arorae fishermen are skilled at catching large tuna and shark using hand lines. Arorae fisherman usually save the dorsal shark fin to export for shark fin soup; however, the island has a strict law against cutting the dorsal fin of any shark without taking the entire shark ashore for food.

At the northern tip of Arorae is a set of stones (circa 1000–1500 AD) that mark out the initial directions for voyages to the other islands - Tamana, Nikunau, Beru and Onotoa. These stones are no longer visible from the sea, but are still called "Te Atibu ni Borau" or "navigational stones". Close to the navigational stones is the "migratory" beach, which disappears and reappears at certain times of the year.

== Transportation ==
=== By air ===
Arorae Airport, featuring Air Kiribati scheduled service on Thursdays, is located in the north of the island, north of the village of Tamaroa.

== Education ==
Arorae is known as the atoll with more literate people of Kiribati, with 98% able to read and write in Gilbertese. There are only two schools in Arorae: namely Arorae Junior Secondary School (JSS) and the Tiona Primary School. There are also two pre-schools. Both schools are enough for the size of Arorae, placed near the Arorae Island Council, with easy access from both villages. In 2011, a total of 198 children were enrolled in the Tiona Primary School and 103 students were attending the Arorae JSS.
