= Abaiang Airport =

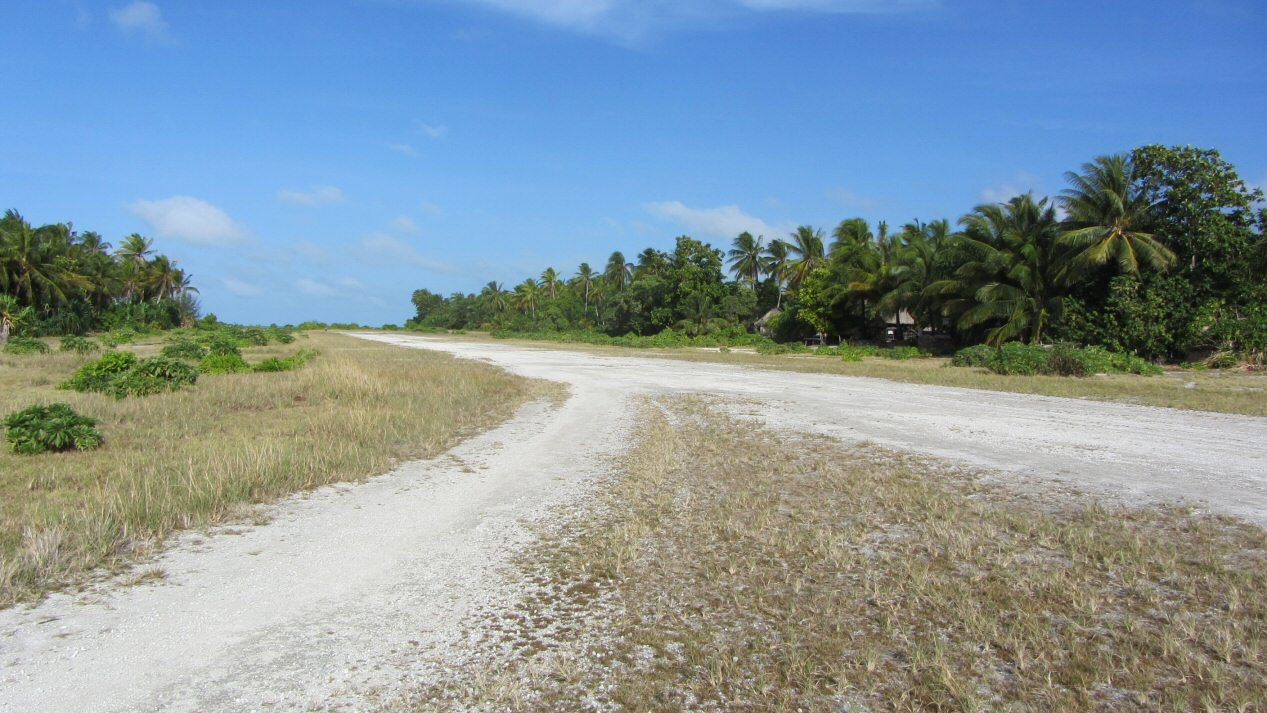
- IATA: ABF; ICAO: NGAB

Summary
- Airport type: Public
- Serves: Abaiang, Kiribati
- Location: Abaiang, Kiribati
- Elevation AMSL: 10 ft / 3 m
- Coordinates: 1°47′47″N 173°02′25″E
- Interactive map of Abaiang Airport

Runways
Direction	Length		Surface
Direction	ft	m	Surface
	2,904	885
- Source: Great Circle Mapper

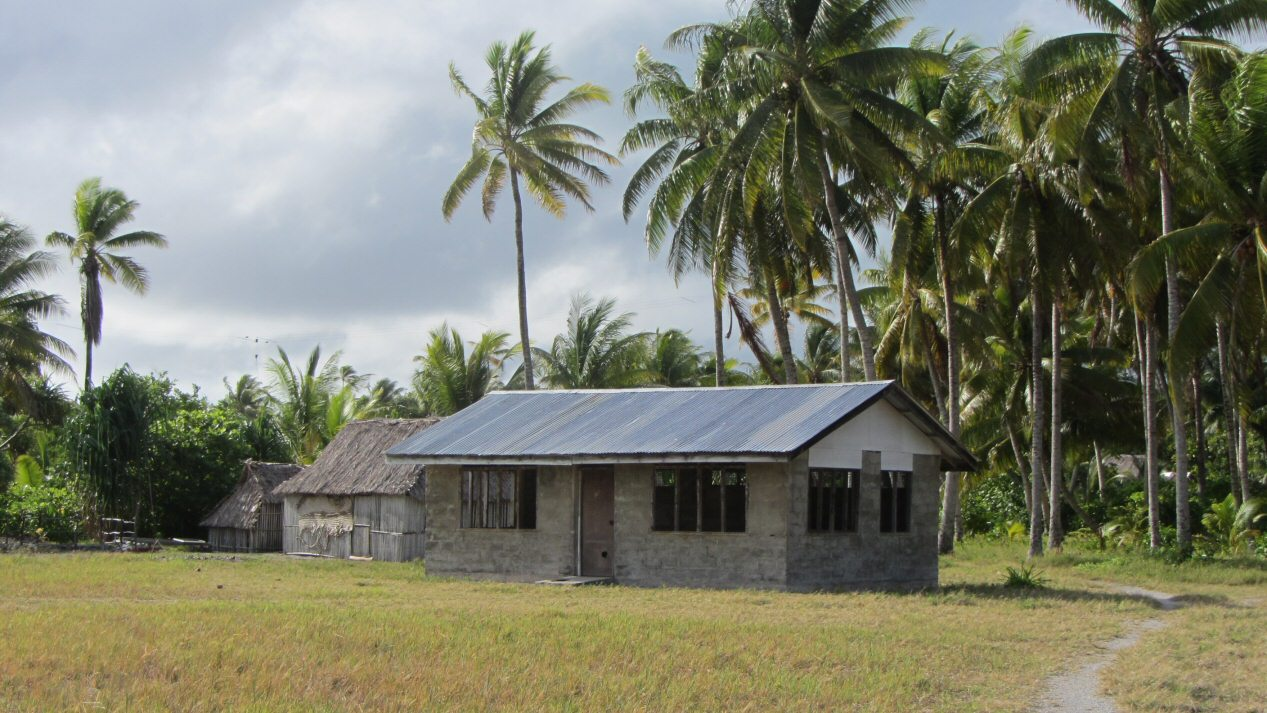
Airport building

Abaiang Airport (IATA: ABF, ICAO: NGAB) is the airport serving Abaiang, Kiribati. It is located on Abaiang Island, between the villages of Tabwiroa (north) and Tuarabu (south).

The airport is served by Air Kiribati from South Tarawa and Marakei on Wednesdays, Fridays and Sundays. Flights to both destinations take only ten minutes.

== Airlines and destinations ==
Airlines	Destinations
Air Kiribati	Marakei, Tarawa
