= Butaritari Airport =

- IATA: BBG; ICAO: NGTU

Summary
- Location: Butaritari, Kiribati
- Elevation AMSL: 5 ft / 2 m
- Coordinates: 03°05′11″N 172°48′41″E
- Interactive map of Butaritari Airport

Runways
Direction	Length		Surface
Direction	ft	m	Surface
07/25	3,500	1,067	Asphalt
- Source: World Aero Data

Butaritari Airport (IATA: BBG, ICAO: NGTU) is an airport on Butaritari in the Pacific Ocean island nation of Kiribati.

== History ==
Butaritari Atoll Airport was built in Kiribati during World War II by the United States after seizing the island from the Japanese. Construction lasted approximately one month, from November 20 to mid-December, of 1943. During the war, the airport was known as Makin Airfield, Butaritari Airfield, Antakana Airfield, or Starmann Field.

The airfield was the base of operations for the United States Army Air Forces Seventh Air Force 41st Bombardment Group which flew four squadrons of B-25 Mitchell medium bombers. Missions from the airfield were flown against Japanese shipping, bypassing islands in the Marshalls and Caroline Islands. In addition to the 41st, the 43d Fighter Squadron (15th Fighter Group) flew P-39 Airacobras and the 531st Bomb Squadron (380th Bombardment Group) flew A-24 Dauntless light attack aircraft from the airfield in late 1943 and early 1944.

The Americans pulled out at the end of 1944, abandoning the airfield. After the war, the airfield was turned into a commercial airport.

== Airlines and destinations ==
Airlines	Destinations
Air Kiribati	Makin, Tarawa

== See also ==
- USAAF in the Central Pacific
- Naval Base Gilbert Islands
