= Aranuka Airport =

Airport in Buariki, Kiribati

- IATA: AAK; ICAO: NGUK

Summary
- Airport type: Public
- Serves: Aranuka
- Location: Buariki
- Elevation AMSL: 6 ft / 2 m
- Coordinates: 0°11′07″N 173°38′11″E

Map

Runways
Direction	Length		Surface
Direction	ft	m	Surface
	2,960	902	Unknown

Aranuka Airport (IATA: AAK, ICAO: NGUK) is an airport, located approximately one kilometre north of the centre of Buariki village on the island of Buariki, Aranuka, Kiribati.

The airport is served twice a week by Air Kiribati from Kuria Airport on Kuria. From there, the aircraft continues twenty minutes after having landed to Bonriki International Airport, Tarawa.

== Airlines and destinations ==
Airlines	Destinations
Air Kiribati	Kuria, Tarawa
