= Cassidy International Airport =

Airport in Banana, Kiribati

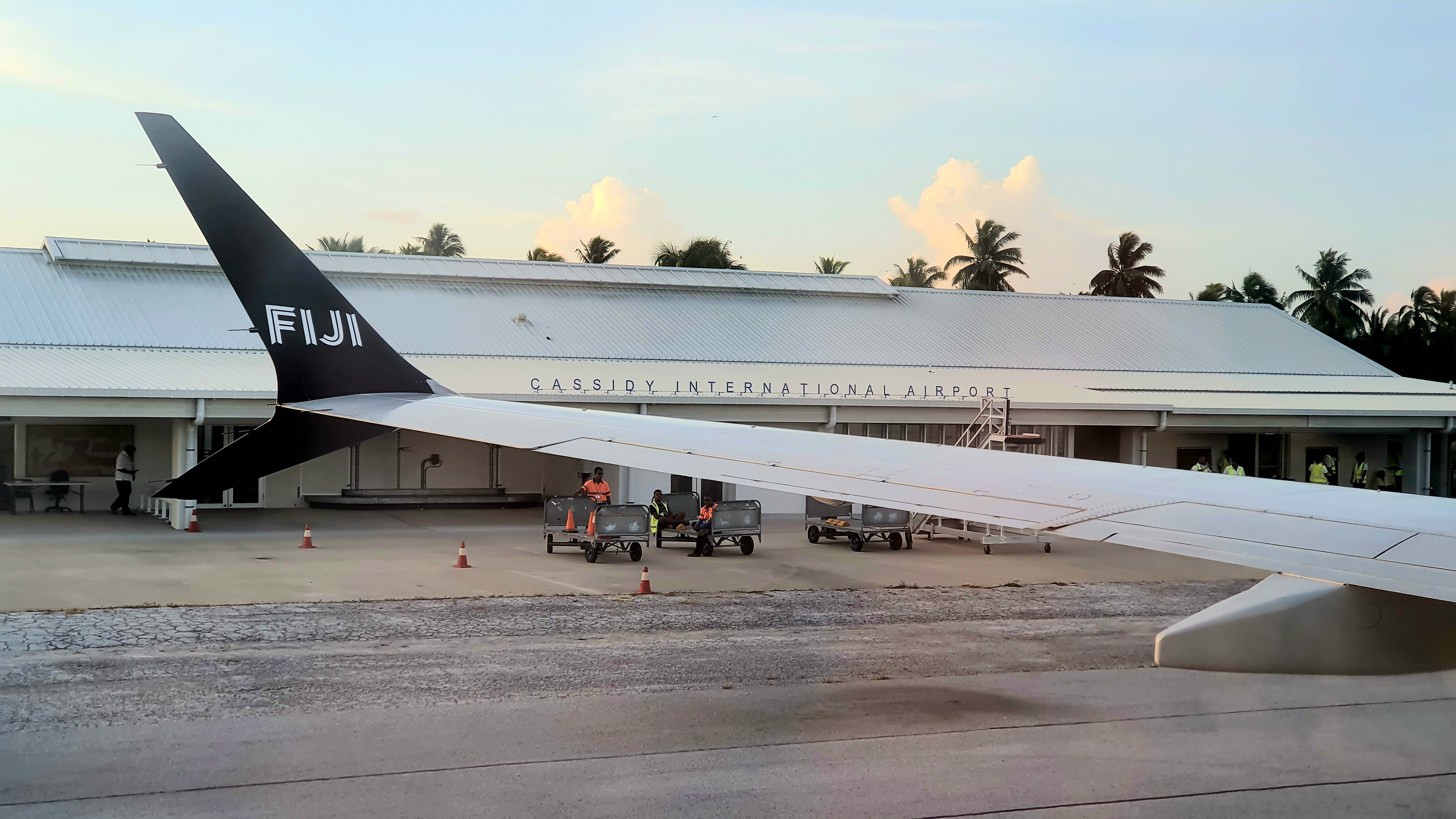
- IATA: CXI; ICAO: PLCH

Summary
- Airport type: Public
- Operator: Government
- Serves: Kiritimati
- Location: Banana
- Elevation AMSL: 5 ft / 2 m
- Coordinates: 01°59′10″N 157°20′59″W

Map
- Location of airport in Kiribati CXI (Oceania)

Runways
Direction	Length		Surface
Direction	m	ft	Surface
08/26	2,103	6,900	Asphalt
- Source: DAFIF

Cassidy International Airport (IATA: CXI, ICAO: PLCH) is an airport located north of Banana, a settlement on Kiritimati (Christmas) island in Kiribati. Until 2018, it was the only airport in the Kiribati part of the Line Islands with an IATA or ICAO code.

The airport is served by Fiji Airways from Nadi, Fiji, and Honolulu, United States. Since neither Air Kiribati nor Coral Sun Airways owns aircraft capable of flying between Kiritimati and the Gilbert Islands, where all other operational airports in Kiribati are located, flights to Tarawa are operated by Air Kiribati using Nauru Airlines aircraft.

== History ==
During World War II, the United States Army Air Forces Air Transport Command used the airport as a refuelling stop on its Pacific transport route from Hawaii to Canton Island for flights to Australia and New Zealand as well as a staging point for attacks on the Gilbert Islands, then partially occupied by Japan. The airport was expanded considerably during the war, and the World War II runway configuration can still be seen as abandoned runways and aircraft parking areas in aerial photography.

By 1981, Air Tungaru, the former national airline of Kiribati, was operating nonstop Boeing 727-100 jet service to both Honolulu and Tarawa as well as nonstop flights to Papeete, Tahiti with this latter service being operated in conjunction with Union de Transports Aériens (UTA), a French airline. Aloha Airlines introduced weekly nonstop Boeing 737-200 jet service to Honolulu in 1986. In 1994, Air Nauru was flying Boeing 737-200 jets nonstop to Honolulu and Tarawa with the latter flight also operating same plane direct service to Nauru. During the early 2000s, Aloha Airlines was once again operating nonstop Boeing 737 service to Honolulu.

== Name ==
Cassidy International Airport was originally named after a United States Army World War II pilot, Wilbur Layton Casady, whose plane crashed near the island on 23 March 1942. The name remained until sometime in the 1980s and was referenced in many books and a Sports Illustrated article on fishing in Kiribati. It is unclear when the spelling changed, but it now uses the spelling 'Cassidy' International Airport.

== Facilities ==
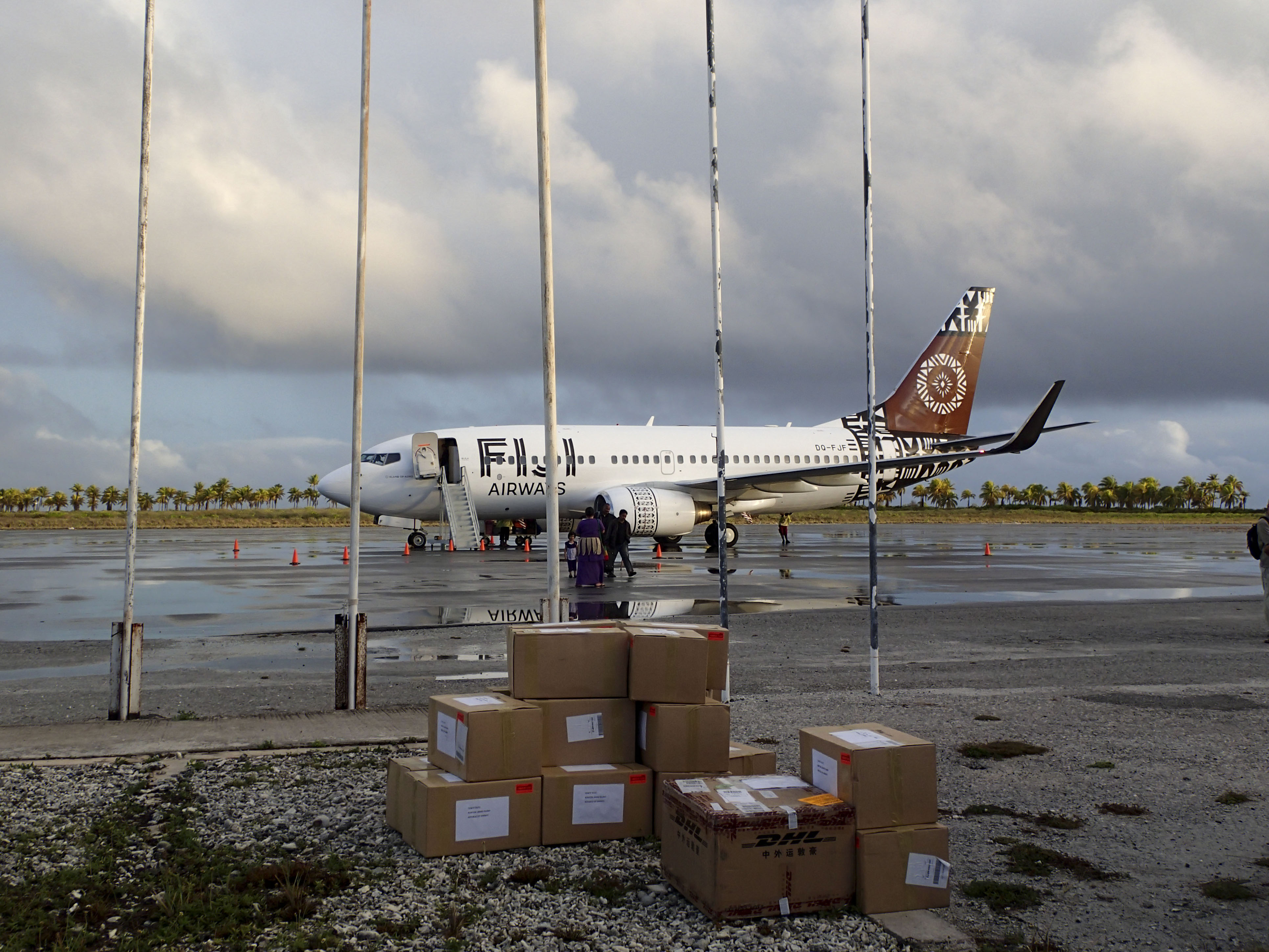
A Fiji Airways Boeing 737 from Nadi en route to Honolulu at Cassidy International Airport. Cargo has been unloaded.

The airport is at an elevation of 5 ft (1.5m) above mean sea level. It has one runway designated 08/26 with an asphalt surface measuring 2,103 by 30 metres (6,900 ft × 98 ft).

== Airlines and destinations ==
Airlines	Destinations
Air Kiribati	Tabuaeran, Teraina
Fiji Airways	Honolulu, Nadi
Nauru Airlines	Tarawa

== Air Pacific service ==
On 29 August 2008, Air Pacific (now Fiji Airways) announced they would suspend flights to and from the airport as of 2 September 2008. The decision was made due to the deteriorating surface of the runway which had been deemed unsafe after an inspection by Air Pacific personnel and specialist runway engineers. Service resumed on 25 May 2010. During the period Air Pacific was not offering its services to Fiji and the United States, a USA company, Te Mauri Travel, offered "interim" charter flights to Kiritimati.
