= Onotoa Airport =

Airport in Kiribati

- IATA: OOT; ICAO: NGON

Summary
- Airport type: Public
- Serves: Onotoa, Kiribati
- Elevation AMSL: 4 ft (1.2 m)
- Coordinates: 1°47′47″S 175°31′33″E

Map
- Location of the airport in Kiribati

Runways
Direction	Length		Surface
Direction	ft	m	Surface
		914

Onotoa Airport (IATA: OOT, ICAO: NGON) is the airport serving Onotoa, an atoll in Kiribati.

The airport is served twice a week by Air Kiribati from Bonriki International Airport (on Tarawa) with a stop at Tabiteuea North Airport.
