= Abemama Airport =

Airport in Tabiang, Kiribati

- IATA: AEA; ICAO: NGTB

Summary
- Airport type: Public
- Serves: Abemama
- Location: Tabiang
- Elevation AMSL: 8 ft / 2 m
- Coordinates: 0°29′27″N 173°49′43″E
- Interactive map of Abemama Airport

Runways
Direction	Length		Surface
Direction	ft	m	Surface
	4,081	1,244

Abemama Airport (IATA: AEA, ICAO: NGTB) is the airport serving Abemama, Kiribati. It is located on the north of the atoll, 200 meters northeast of the village of Tabiang.

The airport is served by Air Kiribati from the international airport at South Tarawa.

== History ==
Abemama Airport was originally built in late 1943 by the United States Navy Naval Base Abemama Seabees of the 95th Naval Construction Battalion for the United States Army Air Forces as O’Hare Field. Seventh Air Force assigned the 30th Bombardment Group to the airfield in early January 1944, basing four squadrons of B-24 Liberator heavy bombers on the base. From Abemama, the USAAF attacked Japanese targets in the Marshall Islands in preparation for the Battle of Kwajalein Atoll (29 January-3 February 1944) and the Battle of Eniwetok (17–21 February 1944). For the United States, these battles represented both the next step in its island-hopping march to Japan, and a victory significant for morale, because it was the first time the United States penetrated the "outer ring" of the Japanese Pacific defensive sphere.

In March 1944, the USAAF combat units moved west into the Marshalls, and Abemama became a transport hub for the 9th Troop Carrier Squadron until August. In addition to the Army units, some Naval aviation units used the airfield in 1944. With the movement of the Allied forces west towards Japan, the airfield on Abemama Atoll was abandoned by the Americans, and after the war, was developed into a commercial airport.

== Airlines and destinations ==
Airlines	Destinations
Air Kiribati	Tarawa

== See also ==
- USAAF in the Central Pacific
