= Tamana, Kiribati =

Island of Kiribati

Tamana
- Map of Tamana

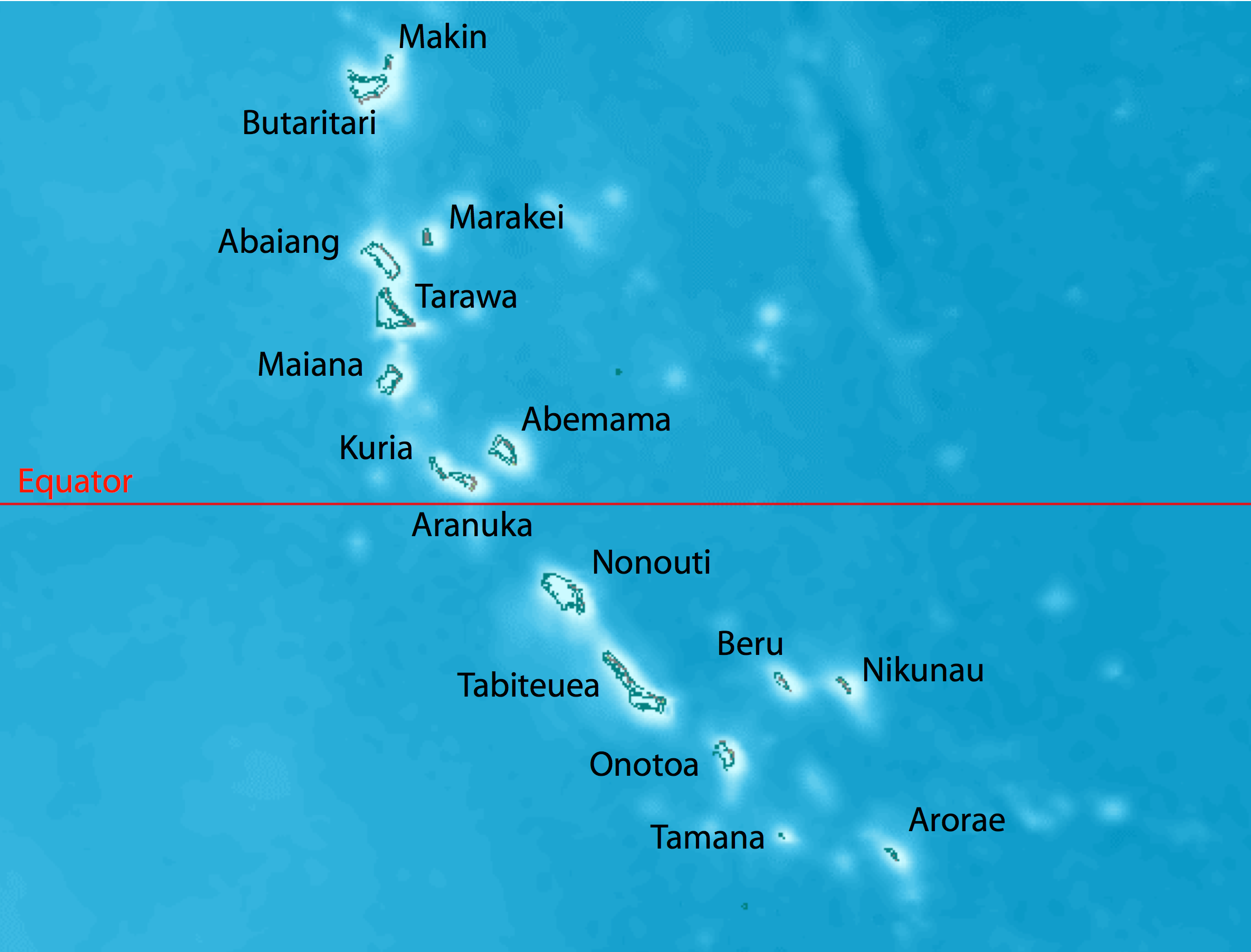

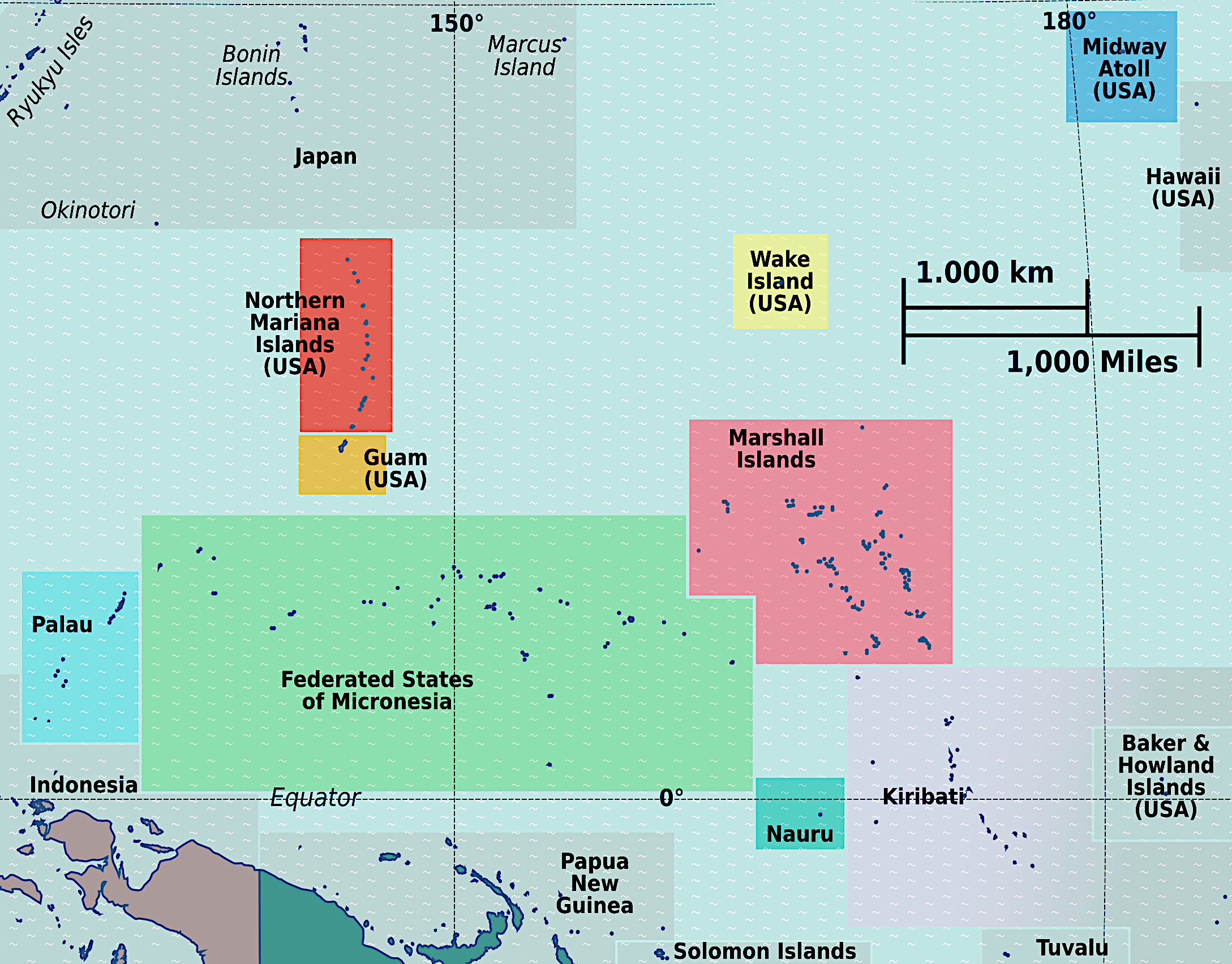
- Location within Kiribati Location within Micronesia Location within Oceania Location within Pacific Ocean

Geography
- Location: Pacific Ocean
- Coordinates: 2°30′S 175°59′E
- Archipelago: Gilbert Islands

Administration
- Kiribati

Demographics
- Population: 1,054 (2020 Census)
- Ethnic groups: I-Kiribati 100%

Tamana (also Rotcher Island) is the smallest island in the Gilbert Islands. It is accessible both by boat and by air with Air Kiribati and Coral Sun Airways (once a week; Tamana Airport code: TMN). 1,054 people live in Tamana (2020 census).

Tamana is the second southernmost island in the Gilbert group and the smallest inhabited island in Kiribati. The island is approximately 6 km (4 mi) in length, 1 km (0.6 mi) at its widest point, and has a total land area of 4.73 km^{2} (1.83 sq mi). Tamana is a reef island with no lagoon.

The Island Council is located at Bakaakaa, the central village of the island and this is also where the rest of the Government facilities are located such as the CB radio for inter-island communication, the hardware store, and the fuel depot. The schools (Primary and JSS) and the Medical facilities are also located in the same village.

== Myths and legends ==
The name Tamana is understood to mean 'his/her father'; although in some myths it is understood to mean ‘a stronghold or strong place, or original settlement’. (Note: Sir Arthur Grimble, cadet administrative officer in the Gilberts from 1914 and resident commissioner of the Gilbert and Ellice Islands colony from 1926, recorded the myths and oral traditions of the Kiribati people. He wrote the best-sellers A Pattern of Islands (London, John Murray 1952, and Return to the Islands (1957), which was republished by Eland, London in 2011, ISBN 978-1-906011-45-1. He also wrote Tungaru Traditions: writings on the atoll culture of the Gilbert Islands, University of Hawaiʻi Press, Honolulu, 1989, ISBN 0-8248-1217-4.)

== History ==
In 1606, Spanish explorers became the first Europeans to discover the island.

Tamana in September 1942 was the southernmost island touched by the Japanese occupation of the Gilbert Islands but Japanese troops did not occupy the atoll.

Tamana Post Office opened around 1915.

== Notable people ==
- Ioteba Tamuera Uriam MBE (1910–1988), politician, creator of "Kunan Kiribati"
- Tekeeua Tarati (born 1971), politician
