= Air Kiribati =

Flag carrier of Kiribati

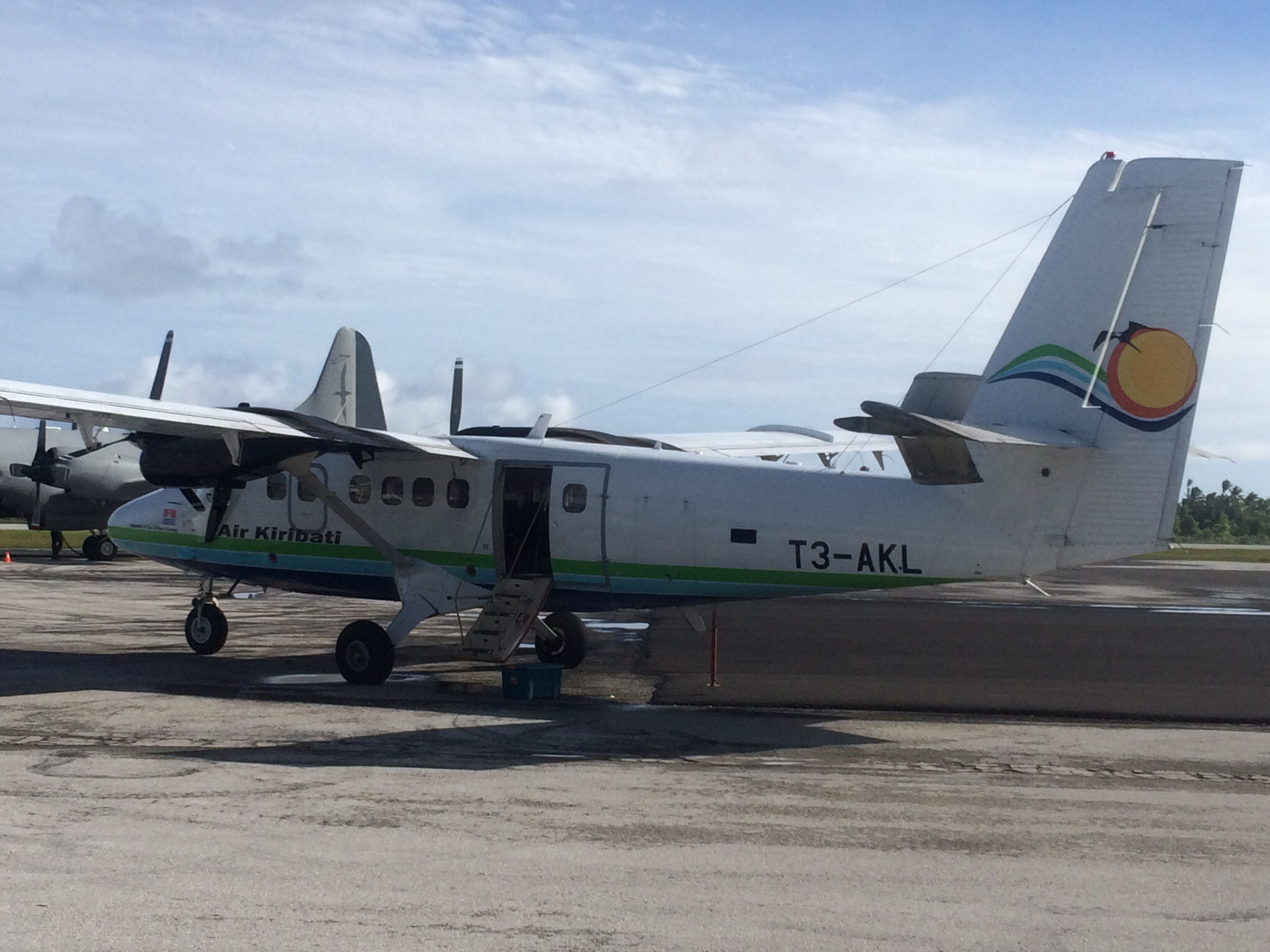
- An Air Kiribati de Havilland Canada DHC-6 Twin Otter
IATA	ICAO	Call sign
IK	AKL	AIR KIRIBATI
- Founded: 1995
- Operating bases: Bonriki International Airport
- Fleet size: 6
- Destinations: 20
- Parent company: Air Kiribati Ltd.
- Headquarters: Bonriki, South Tarawa, Kiribati
- Employees: 71
- Website: www.airkiribati.com.ki

Air Kiribati (pronounced /ɛər ˈkɪrɪbæs/ air KIRR-ib-ass) is the flag carrier of the Republic of Kiribati and operates scheduled passenger services to 20 atolls spread over an area of 3.5 million square kilometres (1,400,000 sq mi).

It is headquartered at Bonriki International Airport on the island of Tarawa in the Gilbert Islands. Regional charter flights, medical evacuation, as well as search and rescue services are also undertaken by the airline.

== History ==
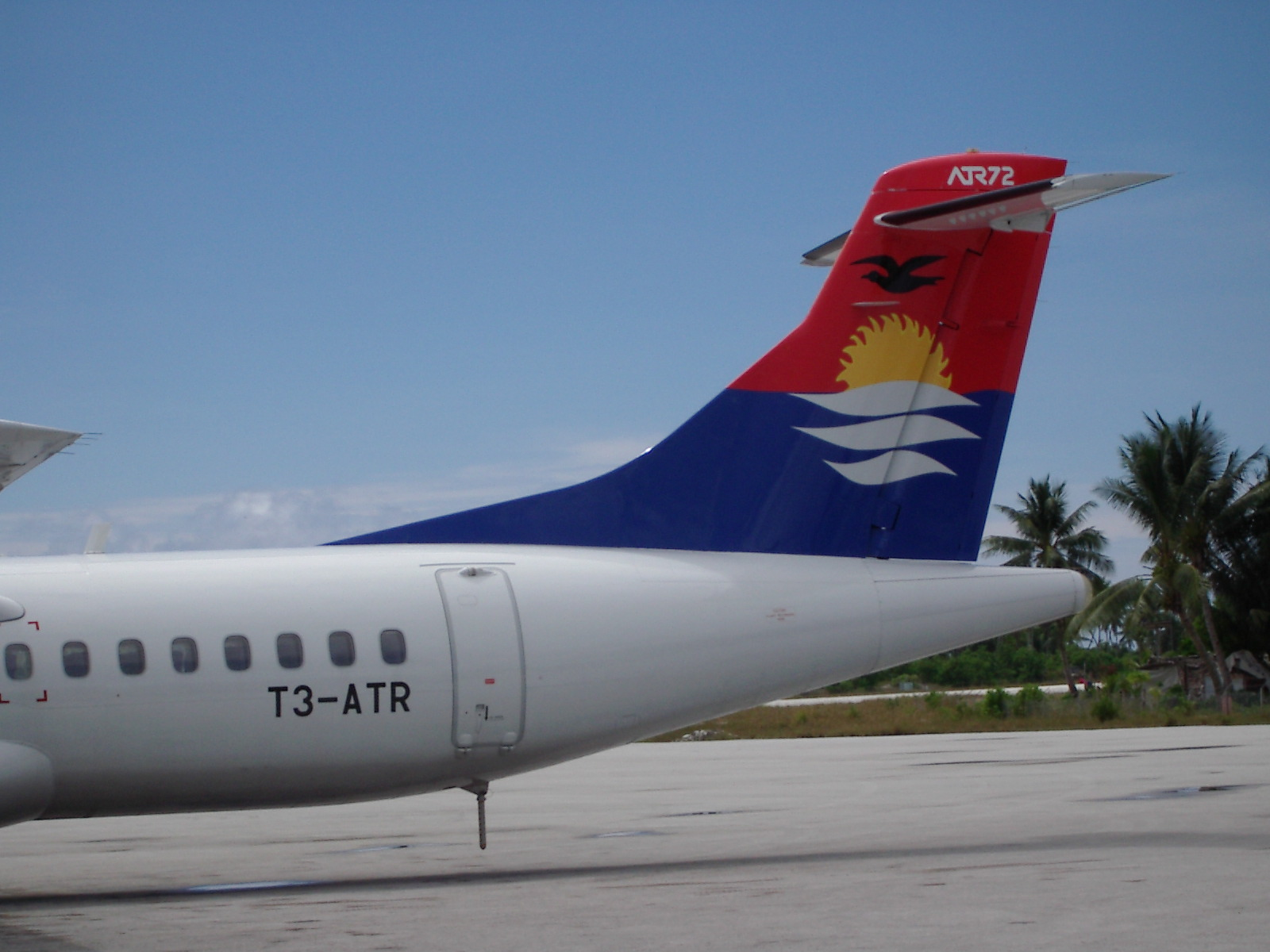
The sole Air Kiribati ATR 72 (T3-ATR)

Air Kiribati was first established as Air Tungaru in 1977. The airline served all 16 domestic airports in Kiribati as well as Honolulu and Papeete with a Boeing 727. In 1996, Air Tungaru ceased operations and Air Kiribati was established to mainly service domestic points in Kiribati with a slew of smaller regional airliners. In 2002, the airline's first ATR 72–500 entered service, but was retired in 2004. In 2016, Air Kiribati also commenced domestic operations in the Line Islands, servicing both Washington and Fanning islands from Kiritimati. In 2017, Air Kiribati's first De Havilland Canada Dash 8-106 was delivered, and in 2019, the first of two Embraer 190-E2s was delivered to Air Kiribati.

== Corporate affairs ==
=== Board ===
Air Kiribati is governed by a board which directly reports to Tekeeua Tarati, the Minister for Information, Communication, Transport and Tourism Development (MICTTD).

Air Kiribati is 100% owned by the Government of Kiribati.

=== CEO ===
On 31 July, Kobebe Taitai was appointed as acting CEO.

In February 2020, Captain Philip Statham became CEO after Tarataake Teannaki moved to become Secretary for Information, Communications, Transport and Tourism Development. Air Kiribati is looking for a new CEO, after position vacant, since August 2021. The position is currently only open to Kiribati nationals.

=== Regulatory oversight ===
The Civil Aviation Authority of Kiribati known as a Civil Aviation Division is one of the Governmental divisions under the Ministry of Information, Communications, Transport and Tourism Development (MICTTD) and is responsible for all Aviation activities in the country. The primary aviation legislation used are:

1. Aircraft Security Act 1990
2. Civil Aviation Act 2004

The actual regulations used are primarily from New Zealand, the NZCARs.

== Destinations ==
As of 2022, Air Kiribati serves these destinations:

=== Kiribati ===
- Abaiang - Abaiang Airport
- Abemama - Abemama Airport
- Aranuka - Aranuka Airport
- Arorae - Arorae Airport
- Beru Island - Beru Airport
- Butaritari - Butaritari Airport
- Kuria - Kuria Airport
- Maiana - Maiana Airport
- Makin- Makin Airport
- Marakei - Marakei Airport
- Nikunau - Nikunau Airport
- Nonouti - Nonouti Airport
- Onotoa - Onotoa Airport
- Tabiteuea North - Tabiteuea North Airport
- Tabiteuea South - Tabiteuea South Airport
- Tamana - Tamana Airport
- Tarawa - Bonriki International Airport - Hub
- Kiritimati - Cassidy International Airport
- Tabuaeran - Tabuaeran Airport
- Teraina - Teraina Airfield

=== Interline agreements ===
Air Kiribati currently has Interline partnerships with the following airlines:

- Nauru Airlines
- Solomon Airlines

== Fleet ==
=== Current fleet ===
As of July 2026, Air Kiribati operates the following aircraft:

Air Kiribati fleet
Aircraft	In service	Orders	Passengers			Notes
Aircraft	In service	Orders	J	E	Total	Notes
De Havilland Canada DHC-6-300 Twin Otter	4	—	—	19	19	One leased from Hevilift PNG.
De Havilland Canada DHC-6-400 Twin Otter	1	—	—	19	19	
De Havilland Canada DHC-8-100	1	—	—	37	37	Leased from Avmax Group.
Embraer 190-E2	—	1	12	80	92	To be operated by Nauru Airlines.
Total	6	1				

=== Fleet development ===
==== Embraer 190-E2 ====
In December 2019, the first Embraer 190-E2 in Air Kiribati livery was delivered to the airline. The E190-E2 has been certified and registered to the Australian Civil Aviation Safety Authority (CASA) since the beginning of 2020.

The Embraer 190-E2 has a maximum range of 5,278 kilometres (3,280 mi; 2,850 nmi). It retains cockpit commonality with its predecessor - E190. E190 pilots will only require a 2.5 days transition training with no flight simulator time needed to be able to fly the E190-E2.

Air Kiribati acting CEO Danial Rochford previously pointed out that "the type's increased range deemed it a "perfect choice" for the carrier." Acting CEO Danial Rochford says that the E190-E2 will offer “opportunities to fly from Australia and New Zealand direct to Kiribati”.

The E190-E2 is able to operate every required route in the Air Kiribati network when it receives ETOPS 120 minutes certification and also allow the airline to operate longer-haul domestic and international routes including connections that had so far been beyond the reach of its current fleet of turboprops.

The Kiribati Transport Minister stated: "non-stop operations between the capital Tarawa and Kiritmati (Christmas) island [sic] currently requires an international stop in Fiji. With a range of 2,850 nautical miles, the E190-E2 can operate throughout the country with non-stop routes."

However, the first of two Embraer 190-E2s was not taken up and never entered passenger service, eventually ended up with the operator, Pionair Australia.

==== Domestic Twin Otter ====
In December 2007, the Kiribati Government approved a request by Air Kiribati to purchase two Canadian-made Twin Otter aircraft. Each plane is reported to cost US$3.3 million, but Air Kiribati's previous CEO Baraniko Baaro reports the purchase is a wise move which will save money currently used for the frequent repairs the aging air fleet requires. In addition, the new planes boast higher fuel efficiency, have room for more passengers and cargo and require less runway length than the current fleet, which may be of benefit on the airstrips of Kiribati's outer islands.

==== Regional Dash 8 ====
Air Kiribati has received its first new Dash 8-100 series aircraft, which touched down at Bonriki International Airport from Canada on 31 October 2017.

Tarataake Teannaki (a previous CEO) said "The Dash 8 is expected to fly to Tabiteuea North, pick up passengers from the Southern Gilbert Islands who will be flown to Tabiteuea North via Air Kiribati’s smaller aircraft stationed on the island to pick passengers from the Southern Gilberts and vice versa.

The aircraft is no longer in service.

ATR 72

On 29 May 2002, Air Kiribati received an ATR 72-202, leased from ATRiam Capital. Air Kiribati operated the aircraft until March 2004, when it was returned to ATRiam Capital.

=== Former fleet ===
As of August 2025, Air Kiribati operated 5 De Havilland Canada DHC-6 Twin Otter and 1 De Havilland Canada DHC-8-100.
