= Makin Airport =

Airport in Kiribati

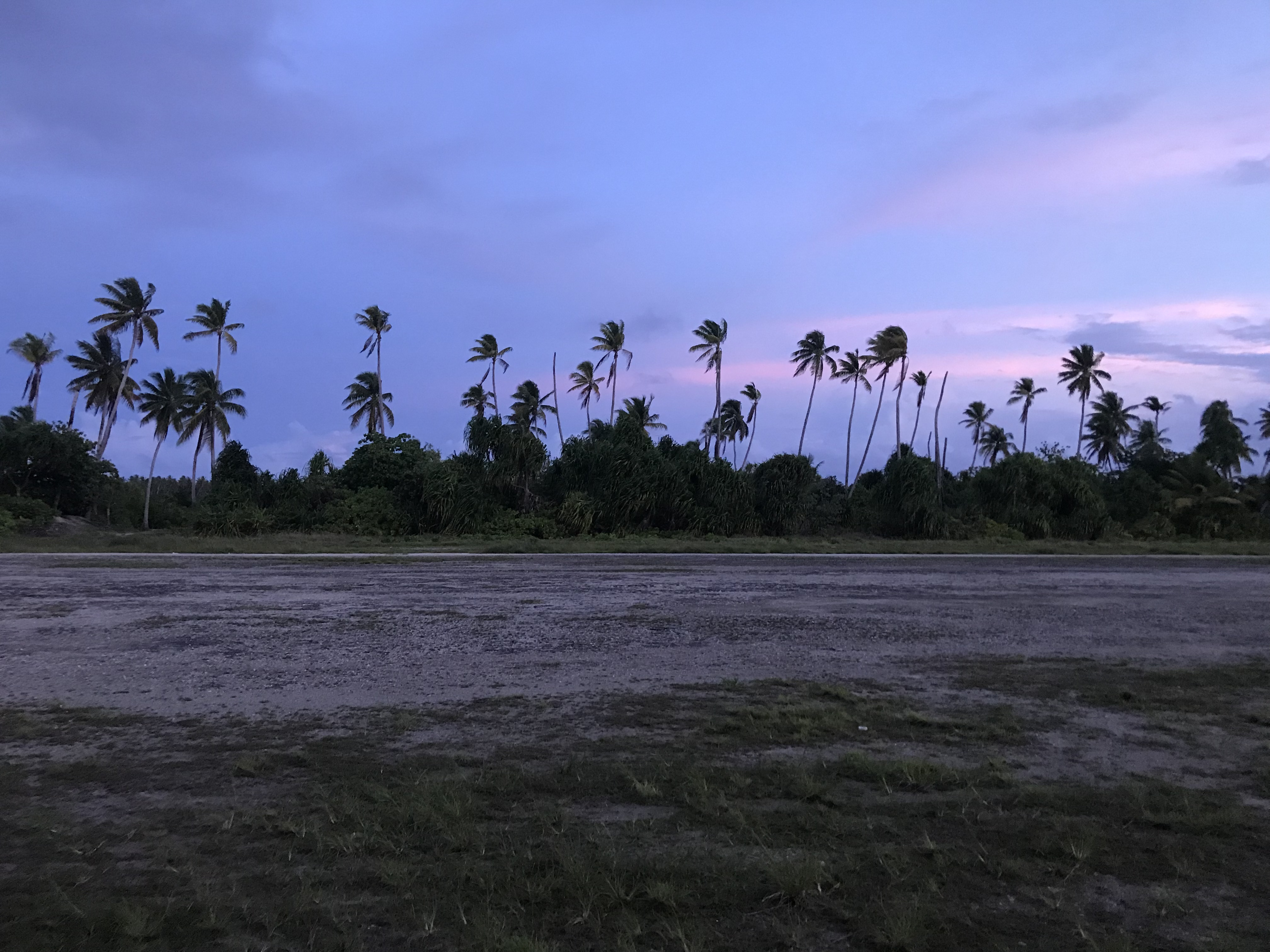
- IATA: MTK; ICAO: NGMN

Summary
- Airport type: Public
- Serves: Makin, Kiribati
- Elevation AMSL: 4 ft (1.2 m)
- Coordinates: 3°22′28″N 172°59′32″E

Map
- Location of the airport in Kiribati

Runways
Direction	Length		Surface
Direction	ft	m	Surface
	2,198	670

Makin Airport (IATA: MTK, ICAO: NGMN) is the airport serving Makin, Kiribati.

The airport is served twice a week by Air Kiribati from Bonriki International Airport (on Tarawa).
