= Marakei Airport =

Airport in Rawannawi, Kiribati

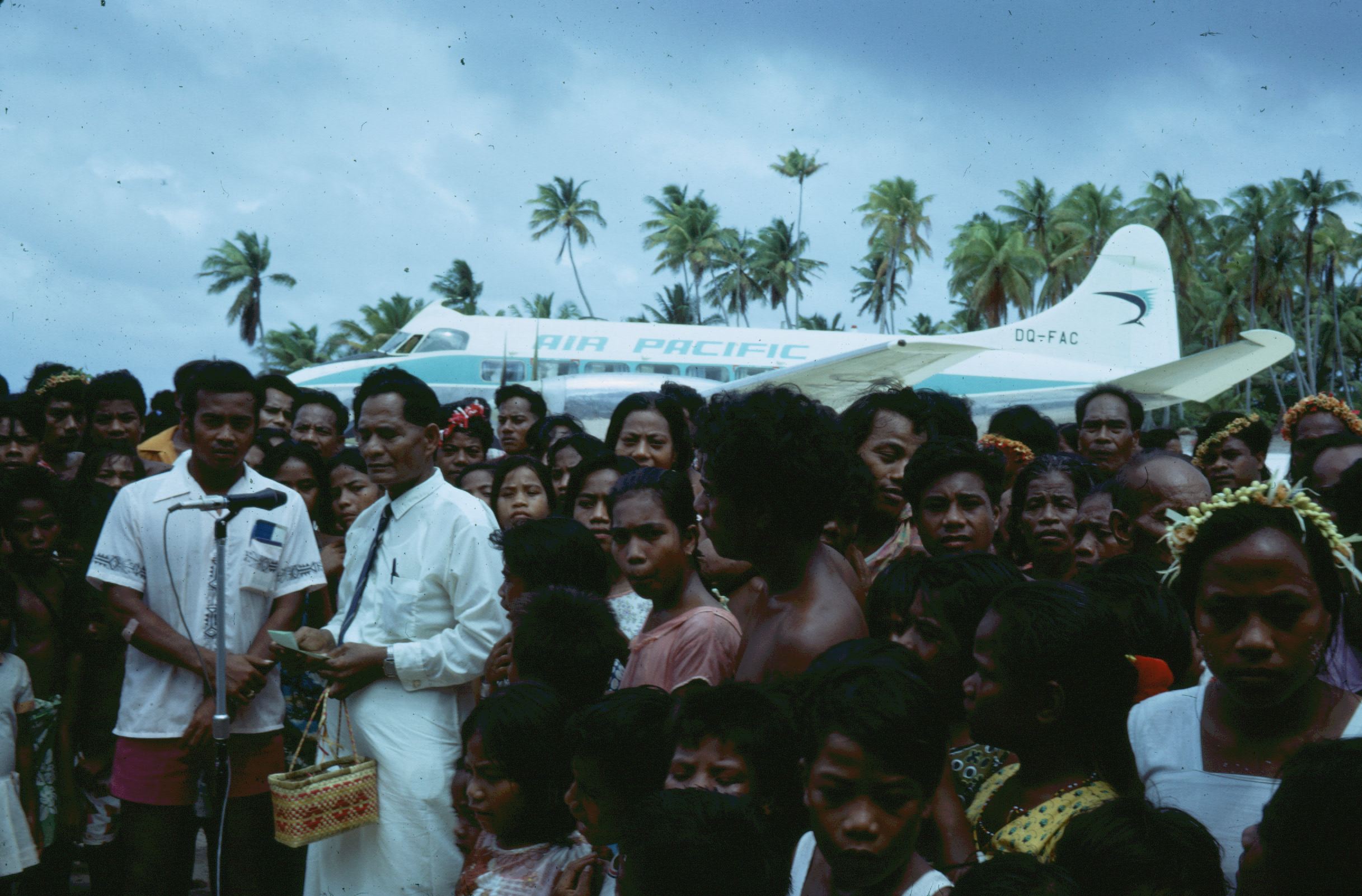
- Official opening of the airport in January 1975
- IATA: MZK; ICAO: NGMK

Summary
- Airport type: Public
- Serves: Marakei
- Location: Rawannawi
- Elevation AMSL: 10 ft (3.0 m)
- Coordinates: 2°3′1″N 173°16′0″E

Map
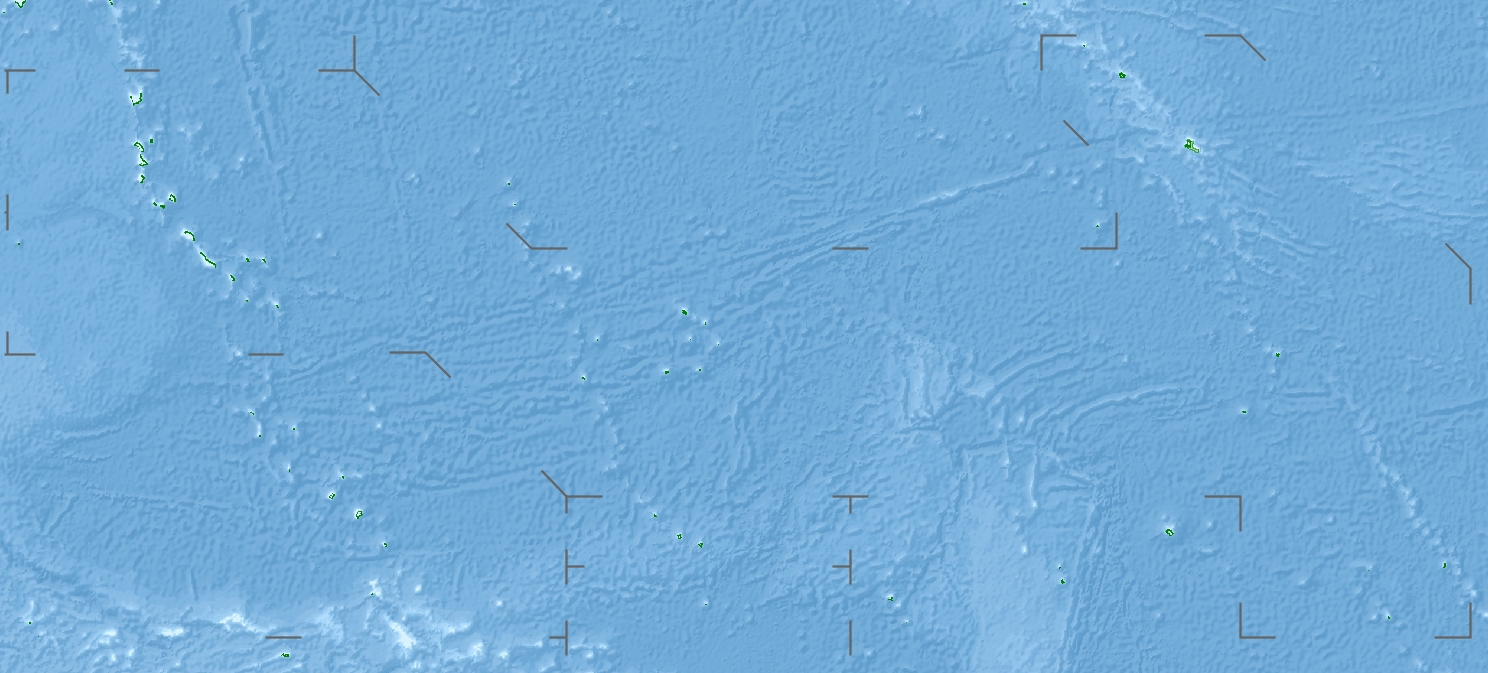
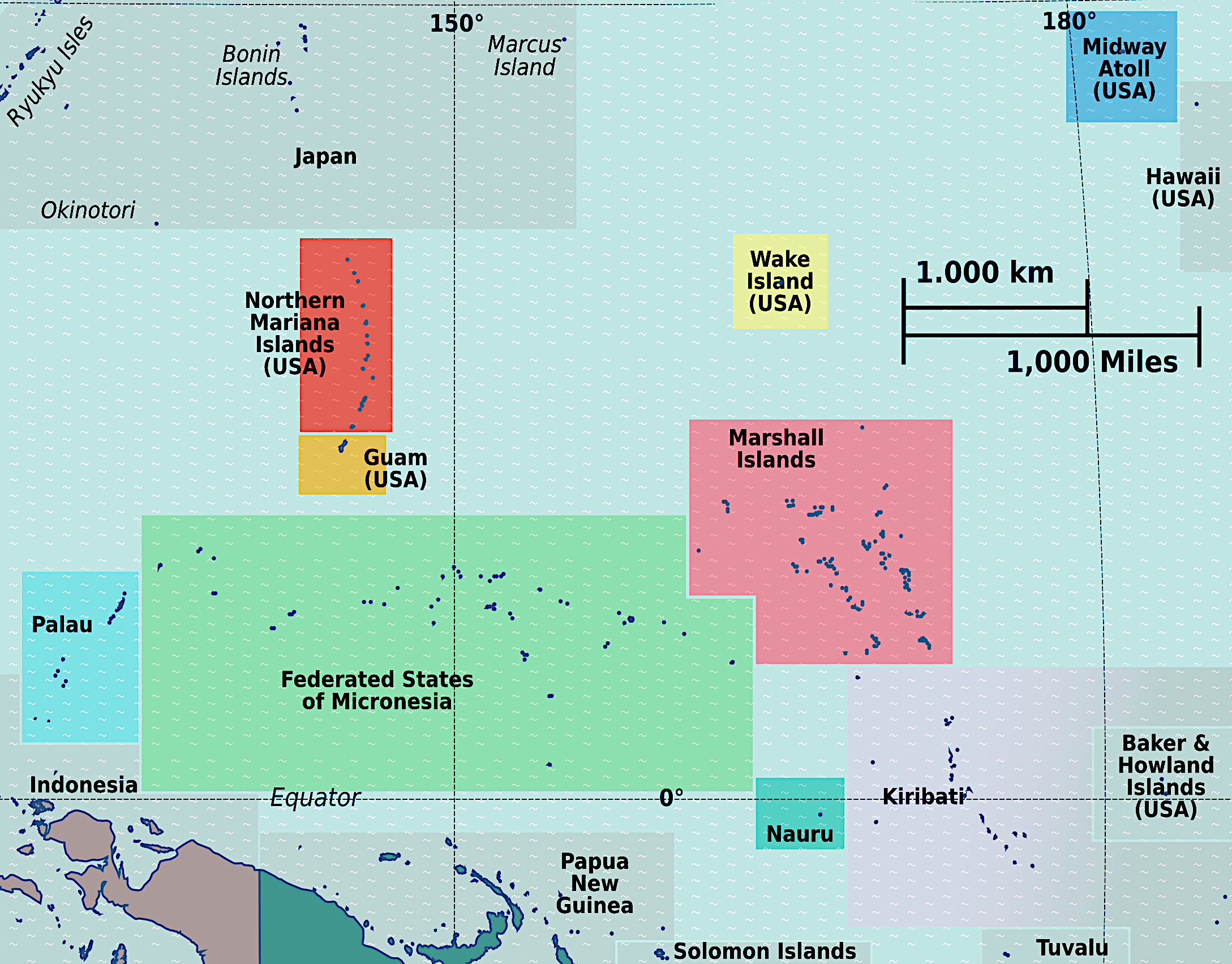
- Location in Kiribati Location in Micronesia Location in Oceania

Runways
Direction	Length		Surface
Direction	ft	m	Surface
	3,050	930	Coral

Marakei Airport (IATA: MZK, ICAO: NGMK) is the airport serving Marakei, Kiribati. It is located on the northern tip of the atoll, near the village of Rawannawi.

The airport is served by Air Kiribati from Tarawa.

In 2020, a visit by Chinese Ambassador Tang Songgen sparked controversy when, on arrival at the airport, he was photographed walking across the backs of locals, including children. Government officials from Australia, the United States and Taiwan publicly criticised the Ambassador's actions. However, many I-Kiribati and academics including Dr Katerina Teaiwa of the Australian National University described these reactions as a "wilful misrepresentation" of a traditional local custom to honour and welcome visitors.

== Airlines and destinations ==
Airlines	Destinations
Air Kiribati	Tarawa
