= Tabiteuea North Airport =

Airport in Tabiteuea, Kiribati

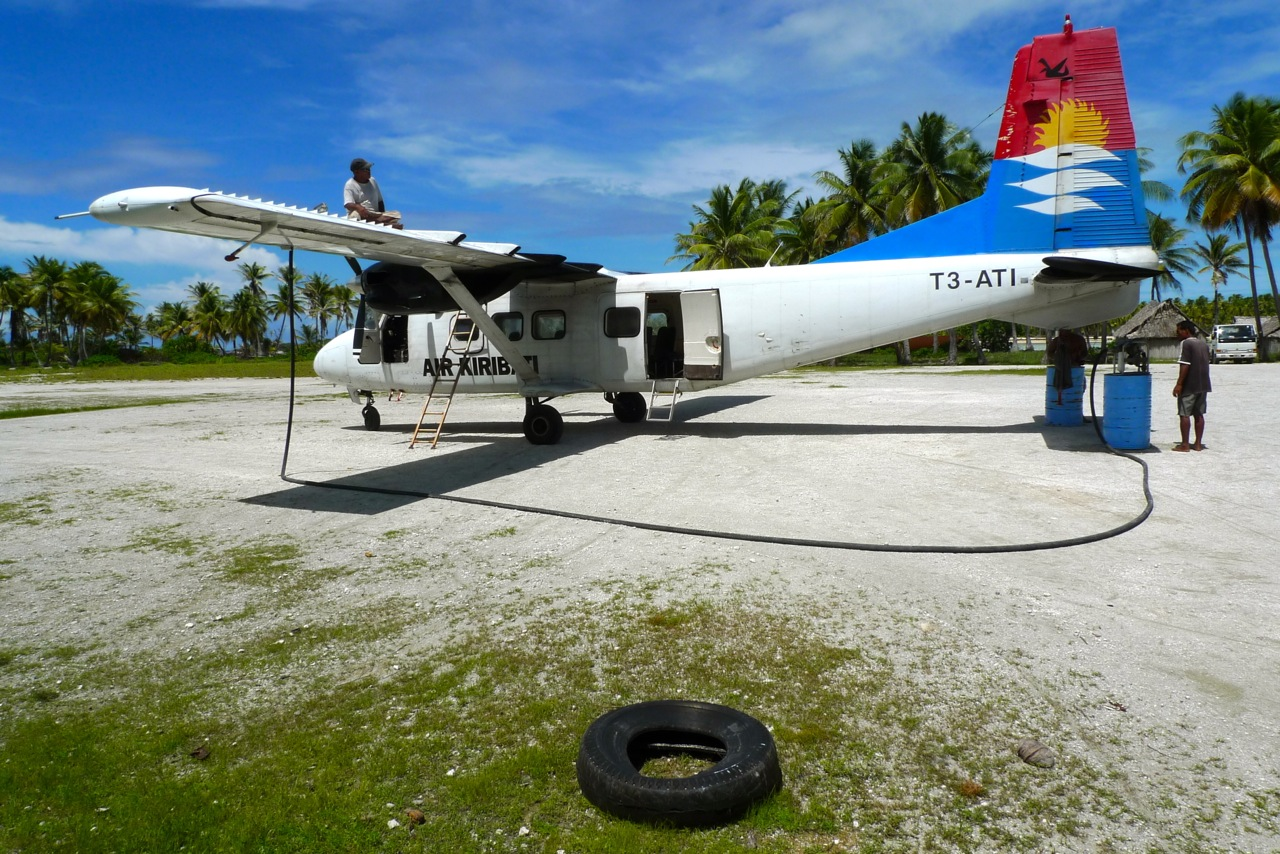
- IATA: TBF; ICAO: NGTE

Summary
- Airport type: Public
- Serves: North Tabiteuea
- Elevation AMSL: 4 ft / 2 m
- Coordinates: 1°13′28″S 174°46′32″E

Map
- Location of the airport in Kiribati

Runways
Direction	Length		Surface
Direction	ft	m	Surface
	3,365	1,026

Tabiteuea North Airport (IATA: TBF, ICAO: NGTE) is the airport serving the northern part of Tabiteuea, Kiribati.

The airport is served twice a week by Air Kiribati from Bonriki, on Tarawa. It is the hub that serves the southern Gilbert Islands, like Onotoa Airport, Tamana Airport or Arorae Airport.

== Airlines and destinations ==
Airlines	Destinations
Air Kiribati	Tarawa
