= Bonriki International Airport =

Airport in Bonriki, South Tarawa, Kiribati

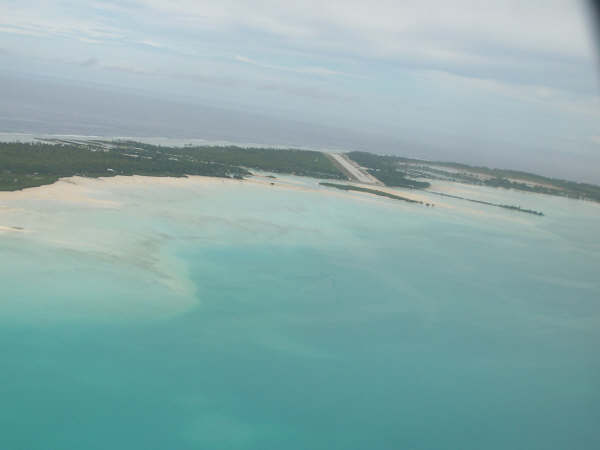
- IATA: TRW; ICAO: NGTA

Summary
- Airport type: Public
- Operator: Government
- Serves: Tarawa, Kiribati
- Location: Bonriki, South Tarawa
- Hub for: Air Kiribati; Coral Sun Airways
- Elevation AMSL: 9 ft / 3 m
- Coordinates: 01°22′54″N 173°08′49″E

Map
- Location of airport in Bonriki, South Tarawa, Kiribati TRW/NGTA (Oceania)

Runways
Direction	Length		Surface
Direction	m	ft	Surface
09/27	2,011	6,598	Asphalt
- Source: DAFIF

Bonriki International Airport (IATA: TRW, ICAO: NGTA) is an international airport in Kiribati, serving as the main gateway to the country. It is located in its capital, South Tarawa, which is a group of islets in the atoll of Tarawa in the Gilbert Islands, precisely on Bonriki.

Fiji's national carrier, Fiji Airways, connects Kiribati with Nadi, which is Fiji Airways' hub and Fiji's main international gateway. Nauru Airlines flies to Nauru International Airport, continuing to Honiara, the capital of Solomon Islands.

The airport is the hub of the only two Kiribati airlines, flag carrier Air Kiribati and the 2009-established Coral Sun Airways, with both airlines mainly flying domestic routes within the Gilbert Islands. Air Kiribati and Coral Sun Airways both serve all 16 other airports in the Gilbert Islands, but not all these destinations are flown directly from Tarawa.

== History ==
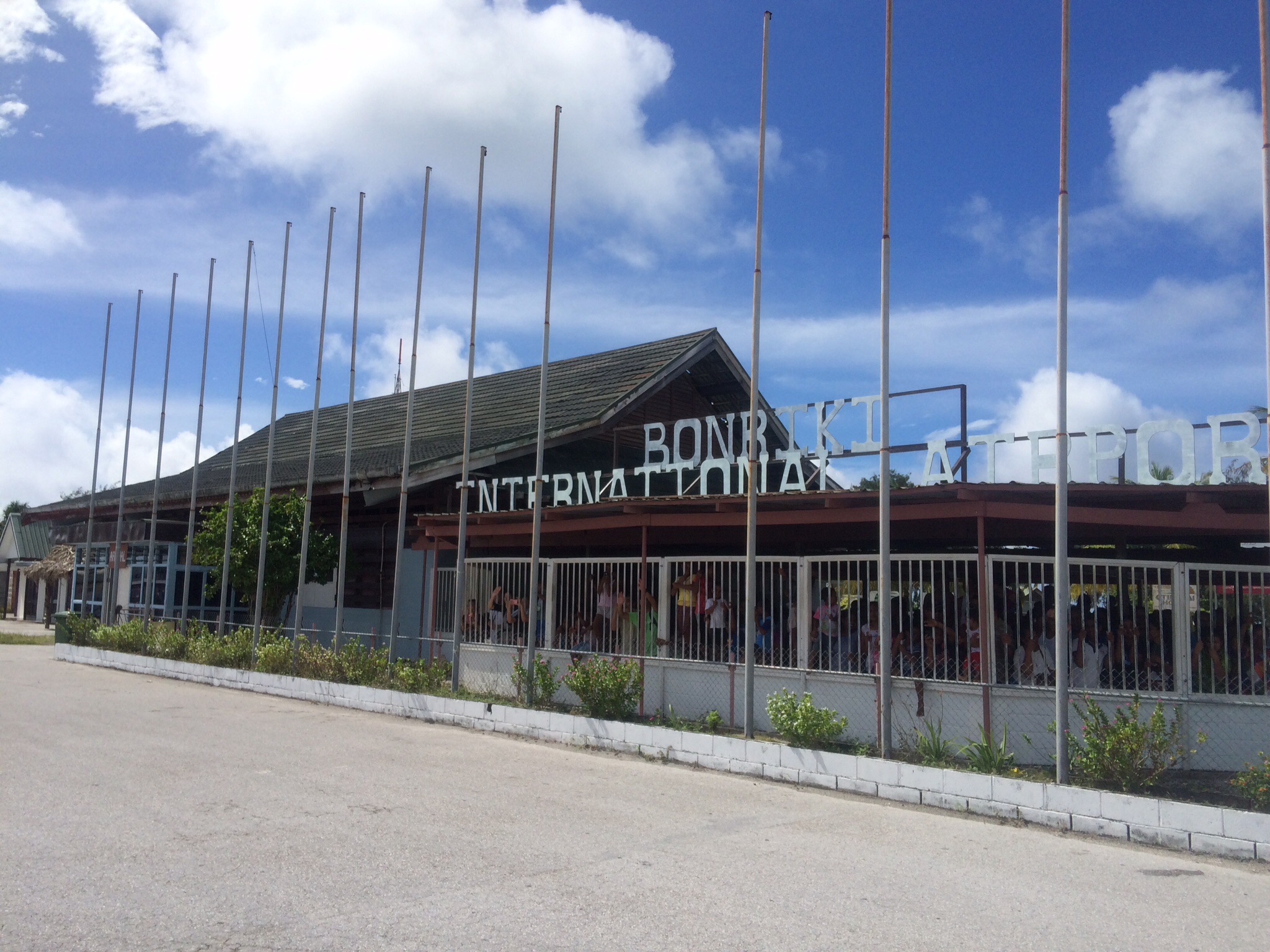
Bonriki Airport in January 2016

The airport was built in December 1943 (82 years ago) by United States Navy Seabees and was named "Mullinix Field", in honor of Rear Admiral Henry M. Mullinix, who died in the sinking of the USS Liscome Bay on 24 November 1943 after it was torpedoed by a Japanese submarine off the Gilbert Islands.

Almost immediately after the completion of the runway, it became the nexus of United States Army Air Forces (USAAF) operations from Tarawa, as the runway at nearby Hawkins Field on Betio was too short for safe bomber operations. The longer runway at Mullinix became the base for the VII Bomber Command Headquarters, which directed operations against Japanese forces in the Marshall Islands. In addition, the USAAF stationed the B-24 Liberator-equipped 11th Bombardment Group and B-25 Mitchell-equipped 41st Bombardment Group at the airfield.

In April 1944, the land-based units moved forward to Kwajalein Airfield in the Marshall Islands, and shortly thereafter, Mullinix was reduced to an emergency airfield. By the end of the war, the Americans abandoned the facilities and the airfield was turned into a civilian airport.

== Facilities ==
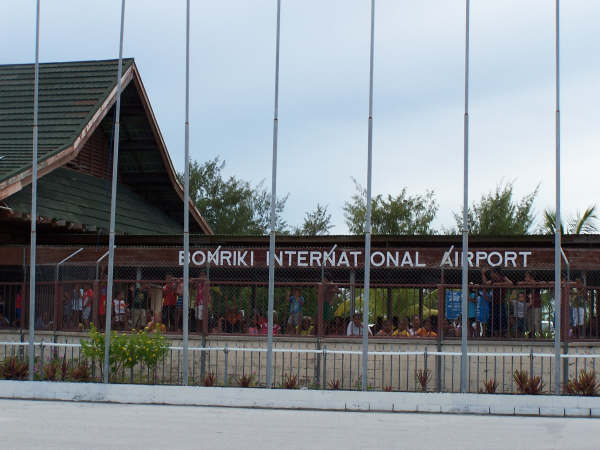
Bonriki International Airport

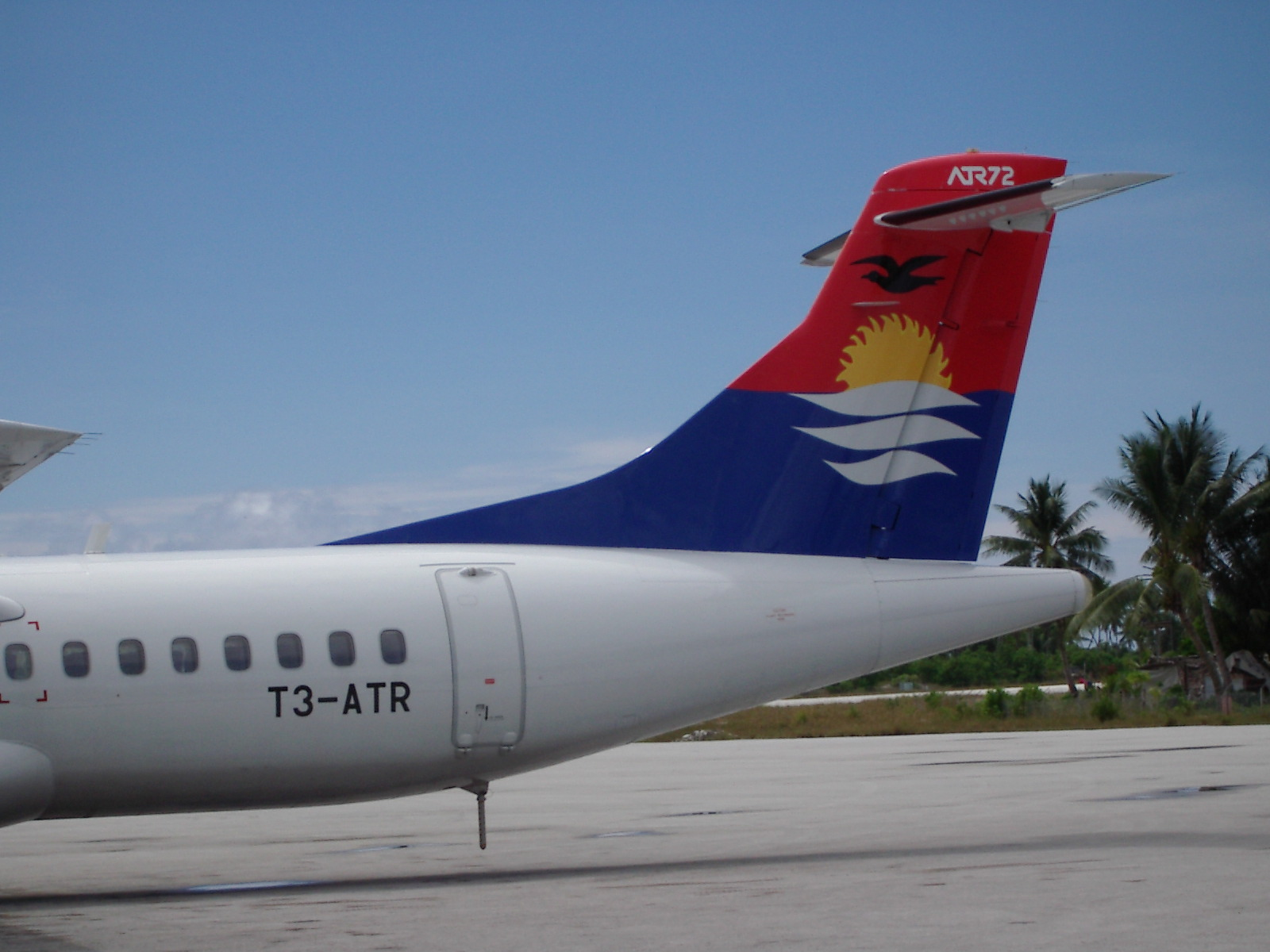
An Air Kiribati ATR 72 aircraft at Bonriki International Airport

The airport is at an elevation of 9 feet (3 m) above mean sea level. It has one runway designated 09/27 with an asphalt surface measuring 2,011 by 41 metres (6,598 ft × 135 ft).

== Airlines and destinations ==
Airlines	Destinations
Air Kiribati	Abaiang, Abemama, Butaritari, Kuria, Maiana, Makin, Marakei, Nonouti, Tabiteuea North
Fiji Airways	Nadi
Nauru Airlines	Brisbane, Kiritimati, Koror, Majuro, Nauru, Pohnpei

== See also ==
- USAAF in the Central Pacific
- Naval Base Gilbert Islands
