= 1991 Kiribati presidential election =

Election of Teatao Teannaki

- 3 July 1991
- Turnout: 73.7% (▼4.6pp)
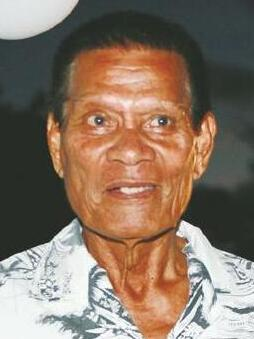

Candidate	Teatao Teannaki	Roniti Teiwaki	Beniamina Tinga
Popular vote	10,123	9,162	1,581
Percentage	46.31%	41.91%	7.23%
Home island	Abaiang		Nikunau
- Map of margin of victory by constituency
President before election
Ieremia Tabai
Elected President
Teatao Teannaki

Presidential elections were held in Kiribati on 3 July 1991. Vice-President Teatao Teannaki of the National Progressive Party (NPP) was elected with 46% of the vote, defeating his main opponent Roniti Teiwaki of Te Waaki ae Boou, who received 42% of the vote.

Incumbent president Ieremia Tabai was term limited, making this the first presidential election in Kiribati in which he was not a candidate. The House of Assembly chose four of its members to stand for the presidency, and collaboration between Tabai's NPP and the unaffiliated Te Waaki ae Boou faction gave the two groups full control of the ballot. In addition to their respective candidates, they nominated two placeholder candidates to fill the ballot and block access to other factions: Boanareke Boanareke for the NPP and Beniamina Tinga for Te Waaki ae Boou. Taomati Iuta, Babera Kirata, Teburoro Tito, and Tewareka Tentoa, all of whom had previously run, were considered potential candidates for their respective factions but failed to make it onto the ballot.

The campaign issues were primarily economic, diverging from the polarising scandals of previous presidential elections. The nation's Catholic–Protestant divide had a lessened effect, as both of the main candidates were Catholic. Teannaki, campaigning on the continuation of Tabai's policies, benefited from the NPP's institutional strength relative to the loosely organised Te Waaki Ae Boou faction. Teiwaki promised voters that he would shift away from Tabai's policy of frugality in favour of greater salaries and subsidies.

== Background ==
Incumbent president Ieremia Tabai was re-elected in the 1987 presidential election. The election brought him to his term limit, making him ineligible for the 1991 election. Tabai's government came under scrutiny in the late 1980s as government funds went missing, which Tabai's finance minister Teatao Teannaki attributed to funds going toward unapproved development projects. An audit found that government funds had been subject to fraud and embezzlement.

In the years leading up to the 1991 election, the opposition attacked Tabai's government for its handling of the economy. They criticised its running the unprofitable state airline Air Tungaru, the decrease in the nation's reserve fund after Black Tuesday, the government's refusal to use the reserve fund to start additional development projects, and its acceptance of foreign aid despite a stated policy of self-sufficiency.

Tabai's supporters joined together as the National Progressive Party (NPP) for the 1991 parliamentary election. Unlike other political parties in Kiribati, the NPP was a formal organisation with its own constitution. They competed against the Social Democracy Party (SDP) and Reitan Kiribati. The SDP was created by the opposition as a successor to the Christian Democratic Party and ERIKO. Reitan Kiribati was an affiliation of independent members created to counteract partisanship.

The parliamentary elections were overshadowed by speculation about who would succeed Tabai. While Tabai's government retained a plurality following the election, the government, the opposition, and Reitan Kiribati saw losses to unaffiliated candidates. Several new members of parliament formed a party, Te Waaki ae Boou, and they aligned with the NPP. In response, the SDP and Reitan Kiribati formed an alliance.

== Candidates ==
=== Early contenders ===
Before the new parliament was elected, there were six major contenders: pro-government figures Teatao Teannaki, Taomati Iuta, and Babera Kirata, opposition leader Teburoro Tito, independent faction leader Tewareka Tentoa, and unaffiliated member of parliament Roniti Teiwaki. This was the first presidential election in which Tabai was not a candidate. Teannaki was the favourite to win leading up to the election, while Teiwaki and Tito were considered his greatest challengers.

Teannaki was a member of parliament for Abaiang. He was Tabai's vice-president and minister of finance. The two were close allies, and Teannaki's consistent support of Tabai's policies gave him an advantage. Teannaki was Catholic, so his candidacy could reach Catholic voters that traditionally voted against Tabai's government. Teannaki had been a candidate in the 1982, 1983, and 1987 elections.

Teiwaki was a member of parliament for the Teinainano Urban Council constituency. During his previous tenure in parliament, he had been the minister of education and minister of finance before leaving parliament in 1982. After working as Director of Extension Services at the University of the South Pacific, where he received the highest salary in Kiribati, Teiwaki returned to parliament in a 1990 by-election. His background gave him several advantages in the election, including his education and his influential family. Though he had government experience, his absence until shortly before the election may have negatively coloured voter perception. He aligned with Te Waaki ae Boou. He had been a candidate in the 1978 election.

Kirata was a member of parliament for Onotoa. He served as Tabai's minister of home affairs and decentralisation. He had been a candidate in the 1978 election. Tito was a member of parliament for Teinainano Urban Council. He was the leader of the opposition. He had been a candidate in the 1987 election. Iuta was a member of parliament for Beru. He served as Tabai's minister of natural resource development. He had been a candidate in the 1978 election. Tentoa was a member of parliament for Onotoa and a dark horse candidate. He led the independent group Reitan Kiribati.

=== Candidate selection ===
Parliament voted to decide which four of its members would appear on the presidential ballot. This was done through a Borda count in which each member of parliament ranked their top four candidates and points were allocated based on how high candidates were ranked overall. To maximise their chances, each of the four parliamentary factions nominated two candidates—their preferred choice and an extra. The selection of a new pro-government candidate was difficult for the NPP. The strongest contender, Kirata, had died days before the parliamentary election. The NPP chose Teannaki as its main candidate, Te Waaki ae Boou chose Teiwaki, the SDP chose Tito, and Reitan Kiribati chose Tentoa. For their backup candidates, the NPP nominated Boanareke Boanareke, Te Waaki ae Boou nominated Beniamina Tinga, the SDP nominated Matakite Bamatang, and Reiten Kiribati nominated Tabwea Teitiniman.

The NPP and Te Waaki ae Boou collectively had a majority in parliament with 28 of the 41 seats. By voting together and alternating their preferences, the two factions held full control over the ballot. Teannaki received the most support to appear on the ballot with 78 points, with Teiwaki receiving 69 points. They were followed by Boanareke with 68, Tinga with 63, Tito with 53, Bamatang with 32, Teitiniman with 25, and Tentoa with 22. Teannaki and Teiwaki became the main candidates, with the NPP's Boanareke and Te Waaki ae Boou's Tinga filling out the remaining two spots to block access to the other factions.

== Campaign ==
Economic issues dominated the campaign. These included copra prices, cost of living, development projects, wages, and the availability of government services. The opposition challenged the government on its accounting discrepancies, its control over the media, and its use of the reserve fund. An issue specific to South Tarawa was the negative effect of urbanisation on the city's native population. There were no polarising controversies dividing the nation in 1991. This was a contrast from the elections of the 1980s, which involved labour strikes, a controversial fishing rights agreement with the Soviet Union, and questions over Tabai's eligibility for re-election.

Teannaki and Teiwaki campaigned in the northern and central islands while ignoring the historically pro-government southern islands. Boanareke and Tinga did not campaign, as they were only running to fill the ballot. Both Teannaki and Teiwaki were Catholic, so the nation's religious divide became less important than in previous elections. Teiwaki instead made appearances in the southern islands of Tamana and Arorae prior to the campaign. These visits left an impact on the Protestant voter base that was sceptical about whether Catholic candidates would serve their interests.

The strong institutional nature of the NPP played a large role in Teannaki's campaign. He touted the economic record of Tabai's government and campaigned on a continuation of Tabai's policies. The campaign benefited immensely from the support of an organised party with seasoned politicians to guide the campaign. This included the publication of pamphlets to tout the government's successes. Tabai campaigned on Teannaki's behalf in South Tarawa, his popularity meaning that a significant advantage came with his endorsement.

Teiwaki campaigned on a change from the previous government. Instead of Tabai's policies of frugality and self-sufficiency, Teiwaki advocated lowering taxes while raising salaries and subsidies to improve quality of life. He appealed specifically to northern voters, but he opted not to appeal to political parties during his campaign, believing that individual personalities were a larger factor in the politics of Kiribati. Teiwaki believed that Tabai's absence from the ballot would create opportunities for another party to take power, and he hoped that his own work with Tabai's government would win him favour. Much of Teiwaki's campaigning took place in the central islands. He appeared in each one, excepting only Teannaki's home island of Abaiang as a gesture of respect.

== Results ==
The election was held on 3 July, and turnout was 73.7% of registered voters. The results were announced by Radio Tarawa approximately six hours after polls closed. Teannaki won with 46.3% of the vote, a lower percentage than all four of Tabai's elections. Teiwaki received 41.9%. Teannaki performed well in the southern islands and Teiwaki in the northern islands, as expected, but both were by closer margins than the 1987 election. The supplementary candidates, Tinga and Boanareke, received many votes from their home islands. Tinga won in his home island, suggesting that the campaign did not make a focused effort to redirect his votes to Teiwaki. Tinga effectively served as a spoiler candidate, taking enough votes from Teiwaki to prevent his victory.

Candidate	Votes	%
Teatao Teannaki	10,123	46.31
Roniti Teiwaki	9,162	41.91
Beniamina Tinga	1,581	7.23
Boanareke Boanareke	994	4.55
Total	21,860	100.00
Registered voters/turnout		73.7
Source: Somoza

=== By constituency ===
Vote share by constituency
Constituency	Tinga	Boanareke	Teiwaki	Teannaki	Total
Abaiang	55	33	227	1,235	1,550
Abemama	64	38	443	414	959
Aranuka	8	7	79	222	420
Arorae	9	17	82	604	712
Banaba	11	9	30	57	107
Beru	81	88	370	471	1,010
Betio	124	64	978	1,027	2,193
Butaritari	19	34	936	371	1,360
Kiritimati	85	62	355	181	683
Kuria	26	31	142	221	420
Maiana	55	54	325	451	885
Makin	7	26	296	184	513
Marakei	23	18	639	257	936
Nikunau	442	17	156	168	783
Nonouti	35	28	408	556	1,027
North Tabiteuea	86	50	173	544	851
North Tarawa	31	20	622	419	1,092
Onotoa	84	50	173	544	851
South Tabiteuea	27	41	381	164	613
Tabuaeran	13	47	173	203	436
Tamana	3	54	254	271	582
TUC	261	141	1,586	1,311	3,299
Teraina	32	59	145	187	423
Total	1,581	994	9,162	10,123	21,860

== Aftermath ==
The NPP's success in electing Teannaki indicated a growing importance of centralised political parties in Kiribati. After their defeat, the SDP, Reitan Kiribati, and Te Waaki ae Boou unified as the Maneaba Party, led by Teiwaki. Teannaki's government first met the following December. As president, he selected cabinet members to represent both Protestants and Catholics as well as each geographic region. This included his appointment of Iuta as vice-president and minister of finance. Tabai received a ministry position, but he left the government to serve as secretary general of the Pacific Islands Forum. Teiwaki criticised Teannaki's government for what he felt was a lack of interest in providing public funding and addressing issues in urban areas. Teannaki's presidency ended in 1994 after he was ousted with a motion of no confidence. He was defeated by Tito in the subsequent election.
