= 1978 Gilbertese parliamentary election =

Parliamentary elections were held in the Gilbert Islands on 1 February 1978, with a second round on 6 February.

== Electoral system ==
The recommendations of the 1977 constitutional convention on a proposed electoral system were introduced prior to the 1978 elections. There were to be 35 members of the House of Assembly, who would be elected from 13 single-member constituencies, 8 two-member constituencies, and 2 three-member constituencies. The three-member constituencies covered South Tarawa, the capital and home to nearly one-third of the entire population of 56,000. For the first time, Christmas, Fanning and Washington Islands, as well as Banaba, each returned one member from their populations of migrant workers and their families.

The 35 members of the House of Assembly were elected from 23 constituencies (with each island forming a constituency) using the two-round system; if no candidate received a majority of the vote in the first round, a second round was held within seven days.

== Campaign ==
All candidates for the 35 seats ran as independents. In three constituencies (two seats on Beru, one on Arorae) the candidates were returned unopposed.

== Results ==
Party	Votes	%	Seats
Independents			35
Total			35
Valid votes	14,715	98.07	
Invalid/blank votes	289	1.93	
Total votes	15,004	100.00	
Registered voters/turnout	18,523	81.00	
Source: Nohlen et al.

== Elected members ==
Constituency	Member
Abaiang	Taniera Kautoa
Abaiang	Teatao Teannaki
Abemama	Teewe Arobati
Abemama	Tekinaiti Kaiteie
Aranuka	Ioane Benna
Arorae	Teeta Ioran
Banaba	Tabuarorae Taniera
Beru	Otiuea Tanentoa
Beru	Taomati Iuta
Betio	Bwebwentaratai Benson
Betio	Teburea T. Bakaoti
Betio	Roniti Teiwaki
Butaritari	Ieremia Tata
Butaritari	Toanimatang Teraoi
Fanning Island	Willie Yee-On
Christmas Island	Moiaua Toariri
Kuria	Tetimra Taie
Maiana	Bwebwetake Areieta
Makin	Binata Tetaeka
Marakei	Naboua Ratieta
Marakei	Tabeata Tamaiti
Nikunau	Tiwau Awira
Nonouti	Etekia Batiua
Nonouti	Ieremia Tabai
North Tarawa (Rural Tarawa)	Tenanoa Kanono
North Tarawa (Rural Tarawa)	Teweia Uaruta
Onotoa	Babera Kirata
South Tarawa (Urban Tarawa)	Abete Merang
South Tarawa (Urban Tarawa)	Karawaiti Taraia
South Tarawa (Urban Tarawa)	Toia Taruru
Tabiteuea North	Baraniko Raaba
Tabiteuea North	Leo T. Ubaitoi
Tabiteuea South	Teitintau Teitiaua
Tamana	Boanareke Boanareke
Washington Island	Tetaake Eria
Source: Parliament of Kiribati

== Aftermath ==
An election for Chief Minister was held on 17 March between Ieremia Tabai, Roniti Teiwaki, Babera Kirata and Taomati Iuta. After Tabai won with 56% of the vote, he appointed a cabinet with Teewe Arobati as Minister for the Line and Phoenix Group, Tiwau Awira as Minister for Finance, Iuta as Minister for Trade, Industry and Labour, Kirata as Minister for Works and Communications, Abete Merang as Minister Health and Community Affairs, Ieremia Tata as Minister for Education, Training and Culture, Teatao Teannaki as Minister for Home Affairs and Teiwaki as Minister for Natural Resource Development. Following independence, Tabai became president, with Teannaki as vice-president.
