= 1983 Kiribati presidential election =

Re-election of Ieremia Tabai

- 17 February 1983
- Turnout: 69.3% (▼13.1pp)
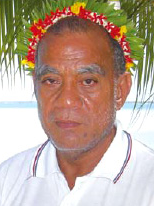

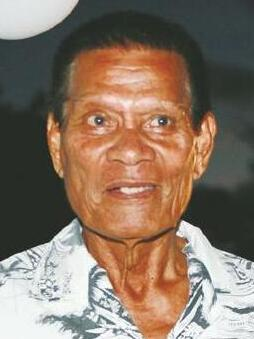

Candidate	Ieremia Tabai	Harry Tong
Popular vote	8,597	4,799
Percentage	49.61%	27.70%
Home island	Nonouti	Tabuaeran
Candidate	Teatao Teannaki	Tewareka Tentoa
Popular vote	2,814	1,118
Percentage	16.24%	6.45%
Home island	Abaiang	Onotoa
- Map of margin of victory by constituency
President before election
Ieremia Tabai
Elected President
Ieremia Tabai

Presidential elections were held in Kiribati on 17 February 1983. Four candidates were chosen from members of parliament: incumbent president Ieremia Tabai, vice-president Teatao Teannaki, who was an ally of Tabai, opposition member Tewareka Tentoa, and newly elected opposition member Harry Tong. Tabai was re-elected with 49.61% of the vote.

The 1983 election was held only one year after the previous election, having been triggered by a motion of no confidence against Tabai's government. The motion of no confidence was nominally about a bill adjusting the pay of government officials, but the opposition cited broader concerns with Tabai's economic policy. Turnout was only 69.3% of registered voters, which marked a significant decrease from the previous election. After winning re-election and serving a full term, Tabai went on to be re-elected again in 1987.

== Background ==
Ieremia Tabai was the first president of Kiribati, initially elected to the office with the title "chief minister" in 1978. He was re-elected to the office, now called president, in the 1982 presidential election. Only 17 of 36 members of parliament supported him after the parliamentary election of the same year, and the short-lived opposition party Wiia I-Kiribati was created afterwards.

When it was discovered that parliament had mistakenly tied the salaries of six statutory officers to that of the public service, Tabai's government introduced a bill to fix the discrepancy in December 1982. As a political manoeuvre against Tabai, the opposition refused to vote for the bill. He raised the bill again, this time tying it to a motion of no confidence. It failed with 15 in favour and 20 against, and the government was dissolved so new elections could be held. There was some confusion and disagreement around this. Some of Tabai's allies were against Tabai's gambit, while some of the opposition did not realise that voting against it would cause them to stand for re-election.

Wiia I-Kiribati interpreted Tabai's motion as a threat, implying that they had to support the bill or risk losing their seats. Tabai countered that if it were a threat, then he would be threatening his own government as well. Wiia I-Kiribati justified its decision to vote against Tabai's government, saying that it also lacked confidence in the government for economic reasons. Their grievances included the costs of a Boeing 747 in the state airline Air Tungaru and the government's subsidies for a shipping corporation.

While the elections were pending, the government of Kiribati was run by the Council of State, which included the Speaker of the House, the chairman of the Public Service Commission, and the Chief Justice. Kiribati held its 1983 parliamentary election on 12 and 19 January, and Tabai saw a net increase of two supporters in parliament.

== Candidates and campaign ==
Parliament selected Ieremia Tabai, Teatao Teannaki, Tewareka Tentoa, and Harry Tong as candidates in the election. Tabai and Teannaki were the same candidates nominated by the government in the previous year's presidential election, while Tentoa and Tong were selected by the opposition. Tabai's ally Roniti Teiwaki believed that the election was fought on a personal level, with the pro-labour opposition holding an animosity for Tabai after the polarising 1980 strike.

Tabai was a member of parliament from Nonouti, and the incumbent president when the motion of no confidence passed. According to Teiwaki, Tabai was weary with politics and reluctant to run for president again. He was popular in Kiribati and the favourite to win the election.

Teannaki was a member of parliament for Abaiang and Tabai's vice-president. Tentoa was a member of parliament from Onotoa, first elected in 1982. Tong was a newly elected member of parliament from the Teinainano Urban Council constituency. His family was involved in the private sector in South Tarawa, and he opposed what he felt were unfair advantages that the government exercised when competing with struggling businesses. Before entering politics, he had been a medical practitioner.

== Results ==
The election was held on 17 February. Tabai won re-election with 49.6% of the vote. His ally Teannaki received 16.2%, meaning that 65.8% of voters supported the government candidates. Turnout decreased from the previous year's presidential election, with only 69.3% of registered voters turning out instead of the 82.4% in 1982. By this point, voters had been asked to turn out for three elections in 1982 and three more in 1983.

Candidate	Votes	%
Ieremia Tabai	8,597	49.61
Harry Tong	4,799	27.70
Teatao Teannaki	2,814	16.24
Tewareka Tentoa	1,118	6.45
Total	17,328	100.00
Registered voters/turnout		69.3
Source: Somoza

=== By constituency ===
Vote share percentage by constituency
Constituency	Tabai	Teannaki	Tong	Tentoa
Abaiang	12.5	73.7	7.9	5.9
Abemama	56.2	20.2	19.7	3.8
Aranuka	65.3	23.0	4.6	7.1
Arorae	95.5	0.2	1.0	0.4
Banaba	76.2	14.3	4.8	4.8
Beru	71.4	11.8	8.3	8.5
Betio	42.3	11.9	42.1	2.6
Butaritari	23.3	12.3	62.4	2.0
Kiritimati	27.4	4.2	60.4	8.0
Kuria	59.7	21.6	15.4	4.2
Maiana	54.8	10.5	27.2	8.8
Makin	58.1	11.2	29.2	1.3
Marakei	14.8	6.7	72.9	5.6
Nikunau	75.4	15.7	6.0	2.9
Nonouti	84.3	10.5	4.4	0.8
North Tarawa	30.6	23.7	42.1	3.6
Onotoa	66.7	3.1	2.4	27.9
Tabiteuea North	67.7	10.8	15.6	5.9
Tabiteuea South	84.3	6.1	4.3	5.4
Tabuaeran	17.3	3.8	25.4	53.5
Tamana	97.0	0.0	1.8	1.1
TUC	40.1	11.3	45.0	3.6
Teraina	4.2	9.1	5.6	81.1
Total	49.6	16.2	27.7	6.5

== Aftermath ==
Tabai built his new government to ensure that different religious and regional groups were represented, but he did not make any outreach to the opposition and filled the government exclusively with his supporters. This included Teannaki, who returned to his position as vice president. Tabai was re-elected again in the 1987 election. A challenge to his candidacy in 1987 determined that 1983 was only the second time Tabai was elected president. This was because his 1978 election under the colonial government was determined to be separate from his presidential elections, and he succeeded to the presidency upon independence. Teannaki was also a candidate in the 1987 election, and he then won the presidency in the 1991 election. Tentoa was a candidate in the 1994 election, while Tong was a candidate in the 1998 election.
