= 1982 Kiribati presidential election =

First I-Kiribati presidential election

- 4 May 1982
- Turnout: 82.4% (▲8.9pp)
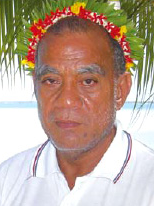

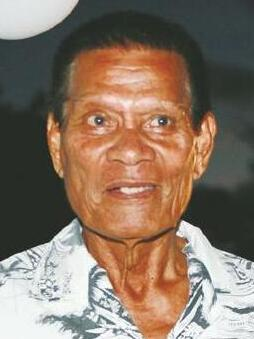

Candidate	Ieremia Tabai	Teatao Teannaki
Percentage	48.7%	28.5%
Home island	Nonouti	Abaiang
Candidate	Etera Teangana	Naboua Ratieta
Percentage	12.3%	10.5%
Home island	South Tarawa	Marakei
- Map of margin of victory by constituency
President before election
Ieremia Tabai
Elected President
Ieremia Tabai

Kiribati held its first presidential election as an independent nation on 4 May 1982. The incumbent president, Ieremia Tabai, who had been elected while the nation was under colonial rule, won re-election with 48.7% of the vote. He placed ahead of his vice-president Teatao Teannaki, opposition leader Naboua Ratieta, and pro-labour member of parliament Etera Teangana. The candidates were chosen by the parliament of Kiribati; an alliance of pro-government and independent members of parliament nominated Tabai and Teannaki, while an alliance of opposition and pro-labour members of parliament nominated Ratieta and Teangana. The election had a turnout of 82.5 percent of registered voters.

Among the issues of the election were a major strike that had taken place in 1980 and a religious divide between Protestants and Catholics, with allegations that Tabai's government was favouring Protestants. Although this was the second time Tabai was elected, it initiated his first full term in independent Kiribati. Tabai's victory only lasted until the end of 1982, when a motion of no confidence dissolved his government and triggered new elections.

== Background ==
Ieremia Tabai was elected chief minister of the Gilbert Islands in 1978, and he became the president of Kiribati upon the nation's independence the following year.

South Tarawa, the capital of Kiribati, had been subject to major strikes since 1974 that had a serious effect on the area's ability to function. Unskilled workers protested low wages that had declined relative to those in the public sector. Another labour dispute began in August 1979, led by the labour union Botaki ni Karikirakean Aroia Taan Makuri. A strike began in 1980 that eventually became violent. 200 workers lost their jobs, and one was injured by police. The government lost much of its support in the city. A pro-labour political movement developed over the following years, organising in South Tarawa and getting its members into the Betio Town Council. They tried to gain influence beyond South Tarawa, but they were unpopular elsewhere in Kiribati for the shipping and communication delays that the strikers had caused.

The 1982 parliamentary election was held on 26 March and 1 April. The government found itself in a weaker position than before, as only eleven of its nineteen supporters were re-elected.

== Candidates ==
The new parliament voted to determine who would appear on the presidential ballot, choosing Naboua Ratieta, Ieremia Tabai, Etera Teangana, and Teatao Teannaki. Unlike the 1978 election for chief minister, the selection process introduced a preferential voting system. This was a response to the organised voting in 1978 that had led to four ideologically similar candidates being placed on the ballot. The votes were allotted as points, and the four highest scoring nominees were placed on the ballot: Teannaki had the most with 70 points, followed by Tabai with 67, Ratieta with 45, and Teangana with 43. The government on its own did not have enough votes in parliament to get both Tabai and Teannaki on the ballot, but they were able to do so with the support of independent members of parliament. Teangana's pro-labour faction aligned with Ratieta and his supporters so they would collectively have enough votes to get both of their respective candidates on the ballot.

Tabai was the member of parliament for Nonouti, and the incumbent president. He governed through a philosophy of frugality and self-sufficiency, implementing a national development plan to encourage development and limit government spending. Prior to the election, Tabai's government implemented a primary health care system and endorsed subsistence farming as a means for the outer islands to support themselves. His government was seen as a "people's government" by his supporters. Teannaki was the member of parliament for Abaiang and the incumbent vice-president. Tabai had chosen Teannaki as vice-president in July 1979, and they were allies in the 1982 election. Teannaki also held the position of Minister for Home Affairs.

Ratieta was the member of the parliament for Marakei, who held his own group of supporters in parliament. He had been chief minister before Tabai but was kept off the ballot by his opponents in the 1978 election. Since then, he had been the informal leader of the opposition. Teangana was newly elected as the member of parliament for South Tarawa, gaining support as a pro-labour candidate. Before entering politics, he had been a teacher at the University of the South Pacific.

== Campaign ==
The election was the first opportunity for voters to evaluate the performance of Tabai's government regarding the 1980 strike and other issues. The strike proved to be a major issue as Tabai sought re-election. The government's handling of independence negotiations and the post-independence economy brought short-term stability to the nation, though it was blamed for a drop in the price of copra, which decreased from 17 cents per pound to only 10. A religious divide opened during the campaign, and many Catholics believed that the government had been showing favouritism towards the Kiribati Protestant Church. Religious leaders were accused of campaigning for their preferred candidates despite their nominally apolitical positions.

== Results ==
The election was held on 4 May with a turnout of 82.4% of registered voters. Tabai was the favourite to win, and he was re-elected with 48.7% of the vote. Between Tabai's and Teannaki's shares of the vote, 77.2% of voters supported a candidate from the ruling government. Of the twenty-three constituencies, Tabai won in eighteen and Teannaki won in four. Ratieta won only in his home constituency, where he received the majority of his votes. Teangana failed to gain a majority in any constituency.

Candidate	Votes	%
Ieremia Tabai		48.7
Teatao Teannaki		28.5
Etera Teangana		12.3
Naboua Ratieta		10.5
Total		
Registered voters/turnout		82.4
Source: Somoza

=== By constituency ===
Vote share percentage by constituency
Constituency	Tabai	Teannaki	Teangana	Ratieta
Abaiang	6.1	91.8	1.5	0.6
Abemama	57.9	28.2	6.9	7.0
Aranuka	55.2	37.9	4.4	2.5
Arorae	97.3	1.6	0.4	0.7
Banaba	61.3	25.8	3.2	9.7
Beru	73.5	15.1	9.6	1.8
Betio	47.5	28.7	15.3	8.5
Butaritari	30.2	45.1	5.7	19.0
Kiritimati	38.8	11.9	35.3	14.0
Kuria	54.1	28.2	12.3	5.4
Maiana	48.1	26.9	17.5	7.5
Makin	41.9	51.0	3.3	3.8
Marakei	5.0	5.3	1.7	88.0
Nikunau	62.4	14.7	22.9	0.0
Nonouti	84.2	12.3	1.7	1.8
North Tarawa	21.6	42.7	23.4	12.3
Onotoa	83.2	11.4	4.1	1.3
Tabiteuea North	63.2	15.2	19.6	2.0
Tabiteuea South	83.0	8.2	7.0	1.8
Tabuaeran	45.8	16.8	17.6	19.8
Tamana	93.0	1.1	5.2	0.7
TUC	40.8	24.0	27.3	7.9
Teraina	73.2	15.4	3.3	8.1
Total	48.7	28.5	12.3	10.5

== Aftermath ==
Tabai was re-elected with a weaker government, holding only 17 of parliament's 36 seats. His term was short-lived, as his government was dissolved by a motion of no confidence in December 1982. A new election was held in 1983, resulting in another Tabai victory and an increase to 19 seats in his government. He was re-elected again in the 1987 election. A legal challenge in 1987 effectively made the 1982 election the first time he was elected president. This was because his 1978 election under the colonial government was determined to be separate from his presidential elections, and he succeeded to the presidency upon independence. Teannaki was a candidate in the 1983 and 1987 elections before winning in the 1991 election.
