= UTC+12:00 =

Identifier for a time offset from UTC of +12

- Time zone
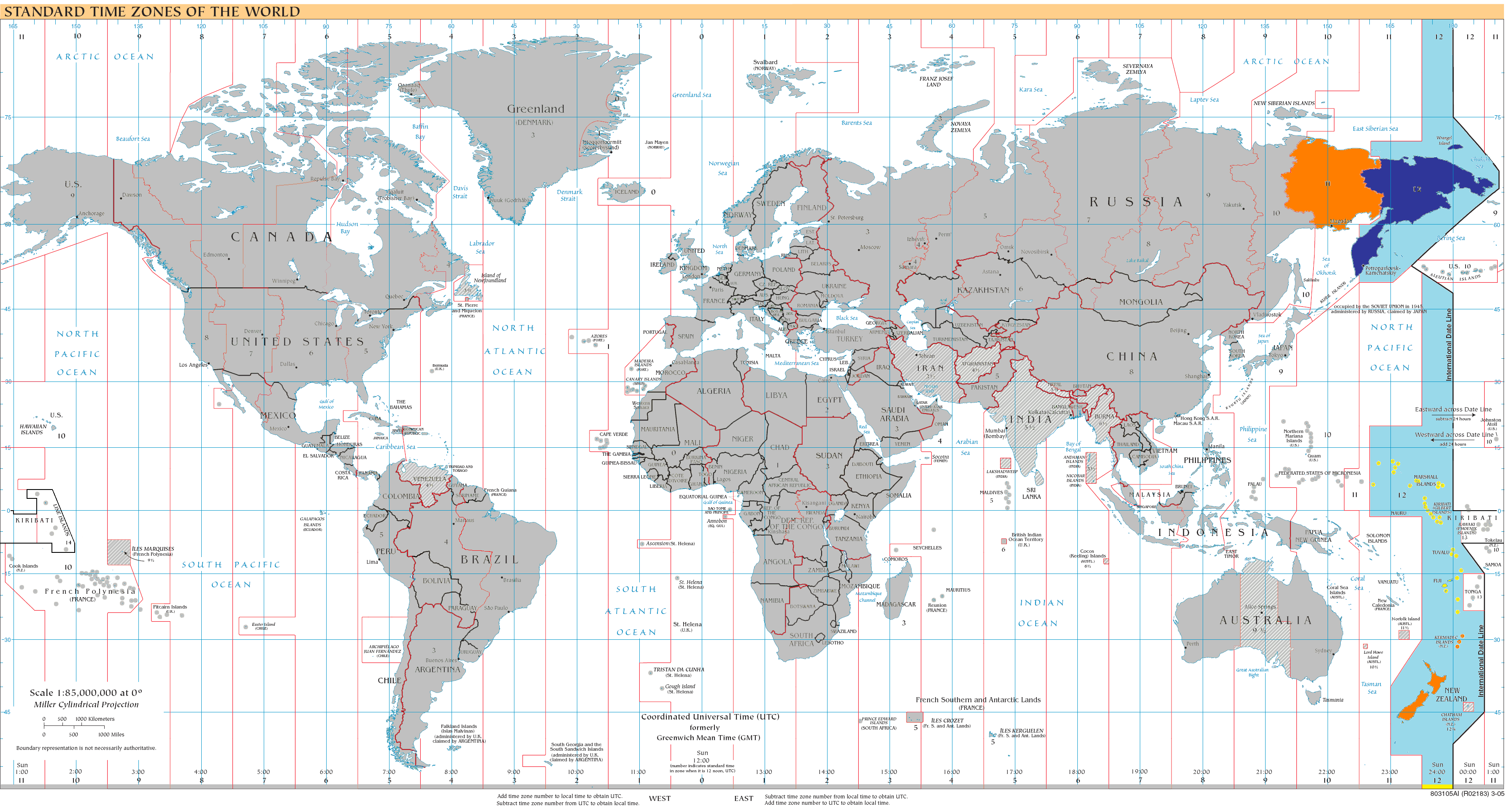
- World map with the time zone highlighted

UTC offset
- UTC: UTC+12:00

Current time
- 01:28, 5 July 2026 UTC+12:00 [refresh]

Central meridian
- 180 degrees

Date-time group
- M

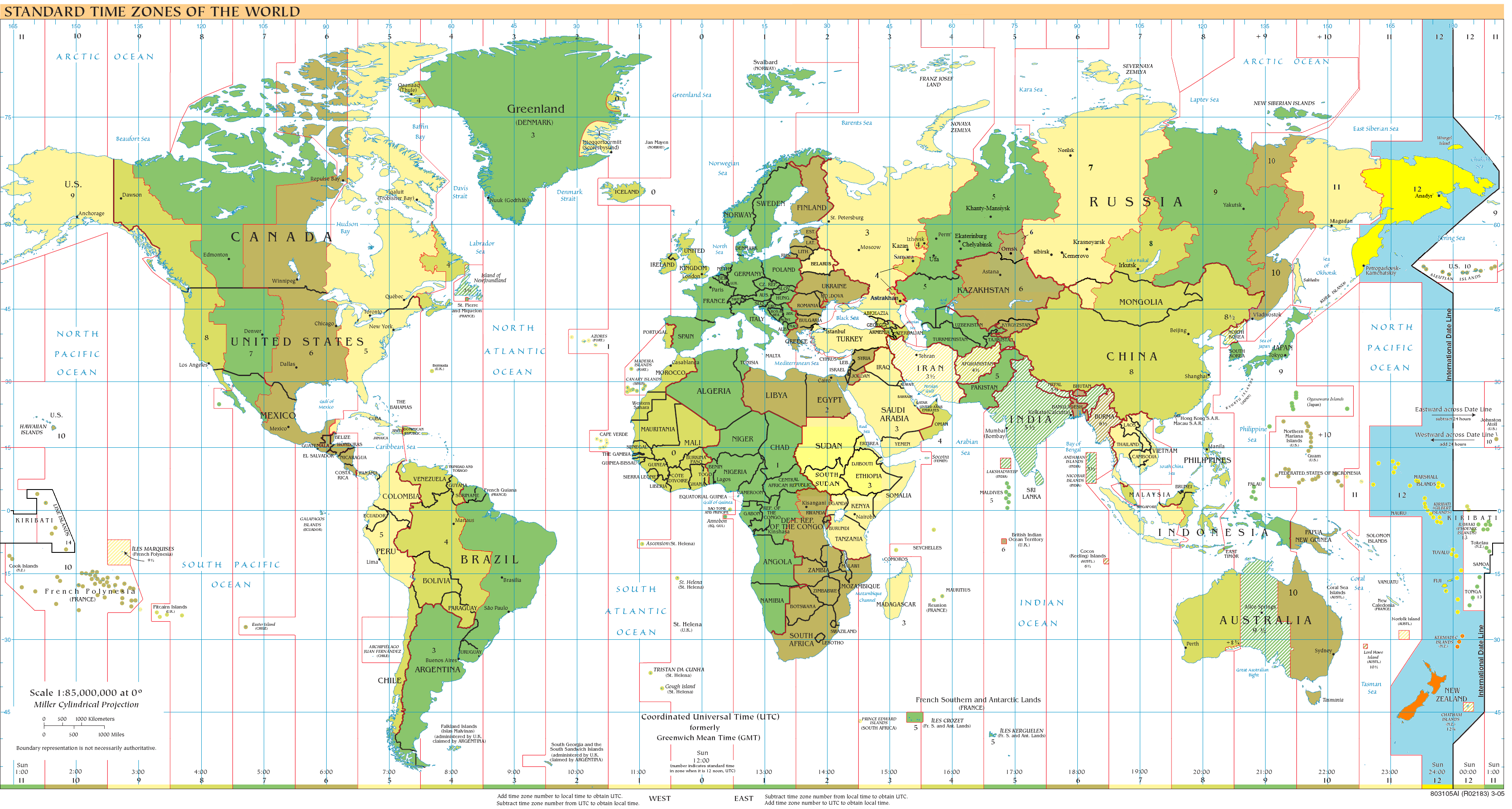
UTC+12:00 in 2010: blue (December), orange (June), yellow (year-round), light blue (sea areas)

Time in Russia: KALT / Kaliningrad Time / UTC+2 / (MSK−1); MSK / Moscow Time / UTC+3 / (MSK±0); SAMT / Samara Time / UTC+4 / (MSK+1); YEKT / Yekaterinburg Time / UTC+5 / (MSK+2); OMST / Omsk Time / UTC+6 / (MSK+3); KRAT / Krasnoyarsk Time / UTC+7 / (MSK+4); IRKT / Irkutsk Time / UTC+8 / (MSK+5); YAKT / Yakutsk Time / UTC+9 / (MSK+6); VLAT / Vladivostok Time / UTC+10 / (MSK+7); MAGT / Magadan Time / UTC+11 / (MSK+8); PETT / Kamchatka Time / UTC+12 / (MSK+9)

UTC+12:00 is an identifier for a time offset from UTC of +12:00.

== As standard time (year-round) ==
Principal cities: Anadyr, Petropavlovsk-Kamchatsky, Mata Utu, Funafuti, Majuro, Yaren, South Tarawa on Tarawa, Suva

=== North Asia ===
- Russia – Kamchatka Time
  - Far Eastern Federal District
    - Chukotka Autonomous Okrug and Kamchatka Krai

=== Oceania ===
==== Pacific Ocean ====
===== Polynesia =====
- France
  - Wallis and Futuna
- Tuvalu

===== Micronesia =====
- United States
  - Wake Island – Time in the United States
- Marshall Islands
- Kiribati
  - Gilbert Islands
    - (Including the Islands of Abaiang, Abemama, Aranuka, Arorae, Banaba, Beru, Butaritari, Kuria, Maiana, Makin, Marakei, Nikunau, Nonouti, Onotoa, Tabiteuea, Tamana and Tarawa)
- Nauru

===== Melanesia =====
- Fiji

== As standard time (Southern Hemisphere winter) ==
Principal cities: Auckland, Christchurch, Wellington

=== Oceania ===
==== Australasia ====
- New Zealand (except Chatham Islands) – New Zealand Standard Time

=== Antarctica ===
- Some research bases in Antarctica, in particular the South Pole and the McMurdo Station. At New Year, these places are the first in the world to see the Sun, which is then visible at midnight.

== As daylight saving time (Southern Hemisphere summer) ==
Principal towns: Burnt Pine, Kingston

=== Oceania ===
- Australia
  - Norfolk Island

== Discrepancies between official UTC+12:00 and geographical UTC+12:00 ==
=== Areas in UTC+12:00 longitudes using other time zones ===
Using UTC-10:00

- United States
  - The western part of Aleutian Islands, Alaska (standard time)

=== Areas outside UTC+12:00 longitudes using UTC+12:00 time ===
==== Areas between 157°30′ E and 172°30′ E ("Physical" UTC+11:00) ====
- Russia
  - The western part of Chukotka Autonomous Okrug
  - Kamchatka Krai
- United States
  - Wake Island
- Marshall Islands
- Nauru

==== Areas between 180° and 157°30′ W ("Physical" UTC-12:00 and UTC-11:00) ====
- New Zealand
  - Kermadec Islands
- Fiji
  - Eastern parts, including:
    - Ringgold Isles
    - Northern Lau Group
    - Southern Lau Group
    - Eastern of Moala Group
    - Vatoa Island
    - Ono-i-Lau
    - Tuvana-i-Tholo
- Wallis and Futuna
- Russia
  - The eastern of Wrangel Island
  - The easternmost part of Chukotka Autonomous Okrug, including Chukchi Peninsula and Big Diomede Island (partly within the "physical" UTC-11:00 area)

== Historical changes ==
Kwajalein Atoll, in the Marshall Islands, advanced 24 hours to the Eastern Hemisphere side of the International Date Line by skipping August 21, 1993.

== See also ==
- Time in New Zealand
- Time in Russia
- UTC−12:00
- Wake Island Time Zone
