= 1987 Kiribati presidential election =

Second re-election of Ieremia Tabai

- 12 May 1987
- Turnout: 78.3% (▲9.0pp)
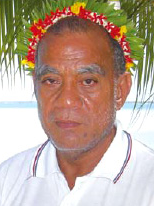

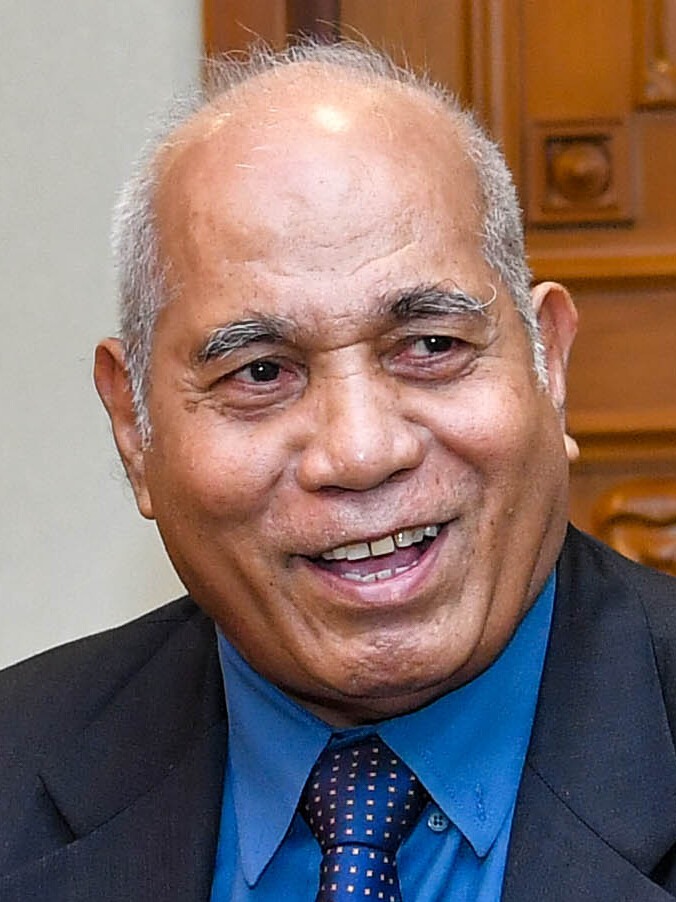

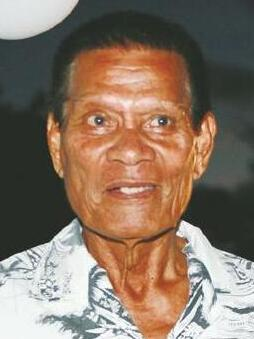
Candidate	Ieremia Tabai	Teburoro Tito	Teatao Teannaki
Popular vote	10,800	9,197	1,550
Percentage	50.12%	42.68%	7.19%
Home island	Nonouti	Tabiteuea	Abaiang
- Map of margin of victory by constituency
President before election
Ieremia Tabai
Elected President
Ieremia Tabai

Presidential elections were held in Kiribati on 12 May 1987. Three candidates for the presidency were chosen from among members of parliament; incumbent president Ieremia Tabai, incumbent vice-president Teatao Teannaki and opposition member Teburoro Tito.

The campaign was heavily centred on a controversial deal that Tabai had negotiated with the Soviet Union in 1985, which granted the USSR fishing rights in the waters around Kiribati. Religion also had a significant effect on the political divide, with Protestants generally supporting Tabai's government and Catholics generally supporting the opposition. In addition, Tabai's candidacy was subject to a legal challenge, as the constitution limited presidents to three terms. The court declined to issue an injunction, allowing Tabai to run for president on the argument that he was elected as chief minister instead of president in 1978.

The results saw Tabai re-elected with 50.1% of the vote, with Tito finishing second with 42.7% of the vote. Teannaki received 7.2%.

== Background ==
President Ieremia Tabai was re-elected in 1983 with a strong mandate and support in parliament. Tabai entered talks with the Soviet Union in March 1985, negotiating access to the waters around Kiribati for tuna fishing. The deal prompted backlash both domestically and internationally, but Tabai justified it by saying that it was "simply a commercial deal" and provided the nation a way to earn its income instead of relying on foreign aid. Tabai's opponents expressed concerns that his actions would drive away neighbouring allies, cut off access to foreign aid, invite sanctions, or risk eroding democracy in favour of communism.

The Bishop of Tarawa made the Soviet fishing issue a religious one by siding against the government, and Catholics criticised the agreement for the involvement of a nation that opposed Christianity. Protestants generally supported the agreement. Tabai's government campaigned to garner support for the agreement, but they found themselves unwelcome to the people of the predominantly Catholic northern islands. A motion of no confidence was raised against Tabai, but it failed with 15 members of parliament supporting it and 19 against it. The agreement expired without renewal in 1986. The 1987 parliamentary elections were held on 12 and 19 March, narrowly preventing Tabai's government from achieving a majority with 20 out of 41 seats.

== Candidates ==
Six members of parliament nominated themselves as candidates, but three dropped out prior to the election. Ieremia Tabai, Teatao Teannaki, and Teburoro Tito were the final candidates. Opposition leader Harry Tong had originally been considered as a candidate, but he stepped aside in favour of Tito.

Tabai and Teannaki were the incumbent president and vice-president, respectively, and they had both run as pro-government candidates in the 1982 and 1983 elections. Tito was a Catholic and a newly elected member of parliament from the Teinainano Urban Council constituency in South Tarawa. He had previously worked as an education officer organising soccer tournaments and had recently attended the University of the South Pacific. Tito built a reputation as "an energetic, highly articulate man" and garnered the favour of Catholic voters.

== Campaign ==
The opposition was energised by Tabai's victory in 1983 and the subsequent controversy around his fishing agreement with the Soviet Union. Tabai denied that the fishing agreement was a factor in the elections, insisting that it was no longer a relevant issue. National politics were a greater factor in 1987 than they were in previous elections, as the Soviet fishing agreement and other polarising debates between the government and the opposition shifted the focus of the public. The opposition organised under the label of the Christian Democratic Party, but this did not function as a true political party and the candidates ran as independents. Both Tabai and Tito limited their campaigning to the islands where they were most popular—Tabai in the south and Tito in the north—forgoing any attempt to garner votes from the other candidate's strongholds.

By 1987, Tabai's opposition came primarily from Catholics, aligned with the pro-labour movement that had previously been influential in the nation. As they had in 1983, Catholics accused the Tabai government of favouring Protestants. In Tarawa, Catholic churches ended sermons with pleas for their members to register to vote. The Protestant Church countered by campaigning in the outer islands, alleging that the Catholic Church was plotting against the Tabai government.

=== Eligibility challenge ===
Under the Constitution of Kiribati, a person is only allowed to be elected president three times, at which point they reach a term limit. It was legally ambiguous whether the 1978 election counted towards his term limit, as the chief minister inherited the presidency upon the nation's independence in 1979. Tong issued a legal challenge, arguing that Tabai's elections in the 1978 chief minister election and the 1982 and 1983 presidential elections made him ineligible to be a candidate in 1987. The Attorney General of Kiribati argued in Tabai's defence.

As Tong had begun proceedings before he was re-elected in the parliamentary election, the High Court of Kiribati ruled that the filing was premature and dismissed the case. After being re-elected, Tong filed a second challenge in the High Court. The court issued its ruling the day before the election. As Tong had dropped out and was no longer in competition with Tabai, it ruled that he no longer had standing. His request for an injunction on Tabai's candidacy was declined. One of the lawyers working with Tong, New Zealand attorney Roger Bell, flew to Tarawa on 10 May so he could add Tito as a plaintiff. Bell had been banned from the country during an unrelated case against the government in 1986, and he was turned away. The court ruled that it had no jurisdiction over Bell's immigration status and that Tong was aware of Bell's inability to appear, but the opposition was incensed nonetheless.

The court also determined that it was not allowed to directly interpret the constitution unless it was on request of the speaker or the attorney general. Tabai was ultimately allowed to run in the 1987 election, meaning that his 1978 election had not been for the presidency and he had only been elected to the presidency twice.

== Results ==
The election was held on 12 May. Turnout was 78.3% of registered voters. Tabai was re-elected 50.1% of the vote. Tito received the highest vote share for any opponent of Tabai's government since independence with 42.7%. Teannaki, the other government candidate alongside Tabai, lost many of his Catholic supporters to Tito. It was speculated that Teannaki split the Catholic vote in a way that made him a spoiler candidate for Tito instead of for his ally Tabai.

Candidate	Votes	%
Ieremia Tabai	10,800	50.12
Teburoro Tito	9,197	42.68
Teatao Teannaki	1,550	7.19
Total	21,547	100.00
Registered voters/turnout		78.3
Source: Somoza

Vote share percentage by constituency
Constituency	Total votes	Tabai	Teannaki	Tito
Abaiang	1,448	26.2%	44.2%	29.6%
Abemama	1,056	33.4%	3.4%	63.2%
Aranuka	303	63.0%	3.3%	33.7%
Arorae	825	98.4%	0.8%	0.8%
Banaba	62	38.7%	12.9%	48.4%
Beru	1,017	68.1%	6.9%	25.0%
Betio	1,947	53.7%	6.3%	40.0%
Butaritari	1,487	22.5%	4.5%	73.0%
Kiritimati	550	44.4%	6.7%	48.9%
Kuria	430	58.8%	3.3%	37.9%
Maiana	900	64.8%	5.6%	29.6%
Makin	735	32.4%	4.2%	63.4%
Marakei	1,143	15.8%	4.0%	80.2%
Nikunau	784	70.2%	4.3%	25.5%
Nonouti	1,044	61.2%	1.7%	37.1%
North Tarawa	907	35.9%	11.5%	52.6%
Onotoa	931	87.4%	4.0%	8.6%
Tabiteuea North	1,051	35.2%	1.2%	63.6%
Tabiteuea South	496	47.0%	2.2%	50.8%
Tabuaeran	175	53.7%	2.3%	44.0%
Tamana	848	98.7%	0.1%	1.2%
TUC	3,288	46.8%	5.5%	47.7%
Teraina	120	55.8%	5.8%	38.2%
Total	21,547	50.1%	7.2%	42.7%

== Aftermath ==
Though Tabai's new government lacked a majority after the election, occasional support from independent members of parliament allowed him to maintain control over the legislature. Tito succeeded Tong as the opposition leader following the latter's resignation in 1989. Tabai was term-limited after the 1987 election, so he supported Teannaki in the 1991 election. Teannaki won and succeeded Tabai.
