= 1978 Gilbertese Chief Minister election =

Election of Ieremia Tabai

- 17 March 1978
- Turnout: 73.5%
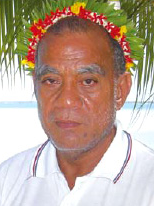

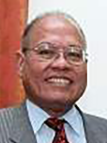
Candidate	Ieremia Tabai	Roniti Teiwaki
Popular vote	8,782	3,897
Percentage	55.61%	24.68%
Home island	Nonouti	Betio
Candidate	Babera Kirata	Taomati Iuta
Popular vote	1,844	1,270
Percentage	11.68%	8.04%
Home island	Onotoa	Beru
- Map of margin of victory by constituency
Chief Minister before election
Naboua Ratieta
Elected Chief Minister
Ieremia Tabai

The Gilbert Islands held its first national election to choose a chief minister on 17 March 1978. Opposition leader Ieremia Tabai won with 55.6% of the vote, following a voter turnout of 73.5%. The election for chief minister came after the parliamentary election of the same year and the new parliament's unanimous vote to replace the appointed chief minister with one that was popularly elected.

Parliament voted to determine which four candidates would be on the ballot, choosing Taomati Iuta, Babera Kirata, Ieremia Tabai, and Roniti Teiwaki. The previous chief minister, Naboua Ratieta, was unpopular in the new parliament, so its members coordinated to assure that he was not selected for the ballot. The four candidates on the ballot were allies, so they agreed that the two lesser-known candidates would campaign to introduce themselves to voters while the other two would not.

Following Tabai's victory, he led the country's independence process and the position of chief minister was renamed President of Kiribati. Tabai was re-elected in the 1982, 1983, and 1987 elections. The 1987 election was disputed because it was unclear whether the 1978 election counted toward Tabai's term limit.

== Background ==
As the Gilbert Islands prepared for independence from the United Kingdom, a constitutional convention was held in 1977. Among its suggestions was that the chief minister be chosen through a popular vote, which was endorsed by the House of Assembly that year. The citizens elected members for a new government in the 1978 parliamentary election, which was held on 1 and 6 February. High turnout indicated a newfound public interest in politics as post-independence leaders were being chosen. The parliamentary opposition saw a surge in support, brought in part by the campaigning of opposition leader Ieremia Tabai, who criticised the government of incumbent chief minister Naboua Ratieta and travelled outside of Tarawa to the outer islands so as to gain their support. Of Ratieta's fifteen supporters in the legislature, eight lost their re-election campaigns. The new parliament met on 20 February 1978, and it voted unanimously to implement popular elections for the chief minister as recommended by the constitutional convention.

== Campaign ==
=== Candidates ===
Candidates were to be chosen from the members of parliament, and five entered themselves into consideration: Taomati Iuta, Babera Kirata, Naboua Ratieta, Ieremia Tabai, and Roniti Teiwaki. Iuta, Kirata, Tabai, and Teiwaki were all allies against Ratieta.

Ratieta was the member of parliament for Marakei. He had been the chief minister since 1974, aligned with an unofficial group called the National Progressive Party. He was associated with the northern Catholic population of the Gilbert Islands and was seen as the anti-labour candidate. Though Ratieta's introduction of a National Provident Fund raised salaries prior to the election, the corresponding raise in taxes angered the pro-labour public. Unlike the other candidates, he believed that the Gilbert Islands should have a national defence force.

Tabai was the member of parliament for Nonouti, and the leader of the opposition against Ratieta's government. He was first elected to parliament in 1974, and he rose to prominence through his vocal criticism of Ratieta's policies, particularly Ratieta's decision to create a defence force. Tabai positioned himself as an advocate for the outer islands, which he felt were neglected by the government. Before entering politics, he had worked as a civil servant with the treasury.

Iuta was the member of parliament for Beru. He had just started his first term in parliament after winning his constituency's election in February. Before entering politics, he was the manager of Atoll Products with the Development Authority, and he had previously worked as a teacher. Kirata was the member of parliament for Onotoa. He had previously been Secretary for Finance and Secretary for Commerce and Industries as part of a civil service career, and he had been a member of parliament from 1967 to 1971. Iuta and Kirata were less known to the public, relative to the other candidates. Teiwaki was the member of parliament for Betio and had previously been the leader of the opposition. Unlike his Protestant allies in the election, Teiwaki was Catholic.

=== Selection by parliament ===
Of the candidates, parliament was to choose four of them to appear on the ballot. An alliance formed with the goal of keeping Ratieta off of the ballot, with 26 members of parliament meeting twice in Tarawa to coordinate. There was no agreement on which other candidate they should support. The voting method for candidate selection had yet to be decided and was to be announced by the colonial governor. Either they would each be allowed to submit one name, or they would be allowed to submit four. Should they be allowed to vote in favour of four candidates, they would choose the four besides Ratieta, keeping him off of the ballot. If they were allowed to choose only one candidate, one of the four would resign from the race so the remaining three would all qualify for the ballot and run against Ratieta. They held a vote and decided that Iuta would step aside in this scenario.

Each member of parliament was ultimately permitted to choose four names to put on the ballot. Ratieta's opponents successfully kept him from qualifying, with two-thirds of parliament voting for the other four candidates. Ratieta criticised the selection process, arguing that if every member of parliament was allowed to select four names, then there would be no ideological diversity on the ballot. The four candidates were exceptionally young relative to the country's usual expectation for a respected elder that was traditionally associated with leadership. All four were under the age of 40, and youngest candidate, Tabai, was only 27. Previous elections indicated that voters were moving away from age in favour of expertise as a qualifying factor.

=== Public campaign ===
All four candidates gave a prerecorded speech that was broadcast over the radio. As all of the candidates were aligned with one another, there was no conflict or animosity during the campaign. They agreed that the people should decide who among them was best fit to be chief minister. Iuta and Kirata campaigned to introduce themselves to the voters, while Tabai and Teiwaki did not, as they were already well-known figures in I-Kiribati politics.

== Results ==
The election was held on 17 March 1978, with a turnout of 73.5% of registered voters. This was the first election to be held at-large across the Gilbert Islands, which was a divergence from the parliamentary elections where candidates were elected by individual constituencies where they had strong ties. Tabai was elected chief minister with 55.6% of the vote. He received the most votes of any candidate in fourteen of the twenty-three constituencies, and he placed second in the other nine. Tabai had appeal across several demographics, subverting the nation's usual North–South and Catholic–Protestant divides. Each candidate benefited from the favourite son effect, showing a strong performance in their home constituencies.

Candidate	Votes	%
Ieremia Tabai	8,782	55.61
Roniti Teiwaki	3,897	24.68
Babera Kirata	1,844	11.68
Taomati Iuta	1,270	8.04
Total	15,793	100.00
Source: Somoza

=== By constituency ===
Vote share percentage by constituency
Constituency	Tabai	Teiwaki	Kirata	Iuta
Abaiang	38.1	56.7	3.1	2.5
Abemama	53.3	24.7	11.9	8.1
Aranuka	75.8	13.5	6.2	4.5
Arorae	87.2	2.2	9.1	1.5
Banaba	42.4	19.6	29.5	8.5
Beru	26.4	3.8	3.0	66.8*
Betio	56.1	29.5*	5.6	8.8
Butaritari	37.6	53.7	2.1	6.6
Kiritimati	32.4	32.3	21.9	11.5
Kuria	70.9	16.3	3.7	3.1
Maiana	91.8	3.6	1.6	3.0
Makin	19.4	71.2	3.2	6.2
Marakei	35.7	47.9	5.3	11.1
Nikunau	88.1	5.1	4.5	2.3
Nonouti	97.2*	1.9	0.5	0.4
North Tarawa	20.0	73.7	3.5	2.8
Onotoa	13.0	1.6	84.7*	0.7
Tabiteuea North	93.2	2.5	1.8	2.5
Tabiteuea South	87.9	3.0	6.1	3.0
Tabuaeran	19.0	46.1	32.0	5.9
Tamana	61.6	2.5	33.7	2.2
TUC	64.1	24.6	6.9	4.4
Teraina	23.6	23.6	48.7	4.1
Total (Note: These are the more widely reported percentages, which differ by 0.1% from those reported by Howard Van Trease in the original source of this table: 55.5, 24.6, 11.8, and 8.1, respectively.)	55.6	24.7	11.7	8.0

Home constituencies are denoted with an asterisk.

== Aftermath ==
After becoming chief minister, Tabai formed his government exclusively with members of the alliance that had forced Ratieta off the ballot. He gave ministry portfolios to the other three candidates from the ballot, appointing Iuta as Minister for Natural Resource Development, Kirata as Minister for Health and Community Affairs and Teiwaki as Minister for Trade and Communications. Tabai's election as chief minister gave him a central role in the negotiations for independence. Iuta, Kirata, and Teiwaki were all part of his delegation. The Gilbert Islands became an independent nation on 12 July 1979, and Tabai's title switched from chief minister to the new equivalent new role, President of Kiribati. After independence, Tabai formed a new government with Iuta as Minister for Trade, Industry, and Labour, Kirata as Minister for Works and Utilities, and Teiwaki as Minister for Natural Resource Development.

To prevent another instance of the parliamentary majority choosing all four candidates, the selection process was changed to preferential voting in the 1982 election. Tabai was re-elected as president in the 1982, 1983, and 1987 elections.

The legal nature of Tabai's 1978 victory became an issue in the 1987 presidential election. The constitution placed limits on the President of Kiribati so that the same person could only be elected to the office a maximum of three times. If Tabai's election as chief minister counted as a presidential election, then he would have reached the limit and would therefore be ineligible in 1987. One of his opponents, Harry Tong, filed two legal challenges, but the court found that he lacked standing in both cases. The 1978 election was ultimately determined to be separate, with his initial presidency being considered a succession when the new constitution came into force.
