= Tekinaiti Kaiteie =

Personal details
- Born: August 16, 1936 (age 89)
- Occupation: Politician; marine aquarium exporter

Tekinaiti Kaiteie (born 16 August 1936) is an I-Kiribati former politician. Kaiteie was educated at the King George V School on Tarawa from 1948 to 1952, and served on the South Pacific Air Transport Council from 1952 to 1978. In 1978, Kaiteie was elected to the Legislative Council of the Gilbert and Ellice Islands as a member for Abemama, while Bauro Tokatake, the customary high chief, was not reelected. He served as a committee member of the Christian Democratic Party, the second political party in Kiribati, and the Foreign Investment Advisory. From 1987 to 1991, Kaiteie served as the Minister for the Line and Phoenix Group. Living in London, Kiritimati, Kaiteie became the owner and manager of Moving Colours, a marine aquarium exporter. He unsuccessfully ran for Kiritimati's seat in the House of Assembly in 2002 and 2007. Kaiteie has nine children.
