= Ieremia Tabai =

President of Kiribati from 1979 to 1982 and 1983 to 1991

Ieremia Tabai GCMG AO
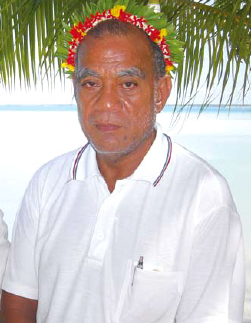
- Tabai in 2009

1st President of Kiribati
- In office 12 July 1979 – 4 July 1991
- Vice President: Teatao Teannaki
- Preceded by: Himself (as chief minister)
- Succeeded by: Teatao Teannaki

Chief Minister of the Gilbert Islands
- In office 1978 – 12 July 1979
- Preceded by: Naboua Ratieta
- Succeeded by: Himself (as president)

Personal details
- Born: 16 December 1949 (age 76) Nonouti, Gilbert and Ellice Islands (now Kiribati)
- Party: National Progressive Party; Boutokaan te Koaua
- Spouse: Meleangi Kalofia
- Children: 3
- Education: Victoria University of Wellington

Ieremia Tienang Tabai GCMG AO (born 16 December 1949) is an I-Kiribati politician who served as the first president of Kiribati from 1979 to 1991. He previously served in the equivalent role, chief minister, under the colonial government from 1978 to 1979. Tabai returned to the House of Assembly in 1998 and represented Nonouti as of his re-election in 2024.

After attending university in New Zealand, Tabai worked in the Ministry of Finance for a year before deciding to enter politics. He was elected to the House of Assembly in 1974 and became the leader of the opposition. Tabai defeated the incumbent Naboua Ratieta to become chief minister in the 1978 election, effectively putting him in charge of independence negotiations, and he became the president of Kiribati upon independence in 1979. He was elected to another term as president in 1982. His term ended abruptly after he tied an unsuccessful bill to a motion of no confidence, but he retained the presidency in the resulting 1983 election. In the early years of his presidency, Tabai made national self-sufficiency central to his agenda.

Tabai signed a fishing agreement with the Soviet Union in 1985, triggering both domestic and international protest. He ran for re-election in 1987, but opposition member Harry Tong filed a legal challenge, saying that Tabai's elections in 1978, 1982, and 1983 meant that Tabai was term-limited. It was determined that the 1978 election was for a colonial position and it did not count against his term limit. Tabai then won re-election. He was term-limited in 1991, so he successfully campaigned for his vice-president Teatao Teannaki to be the next president.

Tabai became Secretary General of the Pacific Islands Forum in 1992, holding the office until 1998. He then returned to parliamentary politics. Tabai founded two media outlets over the next few years: the Newstar newspaper, which was the country's first independently-owned outlet, and a radio station. As an assemblyman, he has opposed Kiribati's relations with China and spoken in favour of smaller family sizes to limit the effects of overpopulation and climate change.

== Education ==
Ieremia Tienang Tabai was born in Nonouti on 16 December 1949. He began attending King George V High School in Tarawa when was 11 years old, and he was chosen for a scholarship sponsored by the government of New Zealand to continue his schooling in the country. The change was difficult for him, where he was separated from his family and poorer than the other students, but he credited the experience with teaching him frugality. Tabai attended college at St Andrew's College, Christchurch from 1967 to 1968. Tabai watched the politicians of New Zealand while he was in the country, with Prime Minister Norman Kirk in particular having a strong influence on him. He graduated in 1972 with a bachelor's degree in commerce and administration.

Tabai returned home to the Gilbert Islands in 1973. He was one of the few in Tarawa who had a degree, allowing him to get a job at the Ministry of Finance. He worked there for one year before switching to politics. He married a woman from the Ellice Islands, Meleangi Tabai.

== Early political career ==
Beginning his political career, Tabai adopted the politics of Reuben Uatioa. Tabai was elected to represent Nonouti in the House of Assembly during the 1974 general election, and he became the leader of the opposition the following year. For this election, Tabai and his allies called themselves the Democratic Labour Party. He became a strong critic of Naboua Ratieta's government, particularly Ratieta's proposal to create a defence force. The voters saw Ratieta as biased toward northern, Catholic, anti-union demographics, so Tabai's southern, Protestant heritage contrasted him with Ratieta. He presented himself as a common man and an advocate for the outer islands.

Part of Tabai's image was based on his rejection of elitism and protocol; the meetings he held on the outer islands were informal, he often rode the bus, and he was known to ride his bicycle to the shops without a shirt or shoes. Tabai was one of several Pacific leaders of his generation to be shaped by the Nuclear Free and Independent Pacific movement. His habit of taking his son fishing and his willingness to harvest his own coconut sap endeared him to voters.

Tabai led an active campaign against the Ratieta administration, critical of its focus on urbanization at the expense of the outer islands and its decision to create a defence force. He attracted support through his performances in broadcasts of parliamentary debates and by visiting many of the outer islands. The primary theme of Tabai's campaign was that the Ratieta administration was out of touch with the needs of the outer islands and their people. Through his campaigning, he created the impression that Ratieta was ignoring the nation's self-governance and represented a continuation of colonial leadership. After the election, Tabai felt that local issues determined elections more than the national issues that he considered only relevant to South Tarawa.

When the House of Assembly approved a constitutional amendment to establish a popularly elected chief minister, Tabai and three of his allies competed with Ratieta, preventing Ratieta from qualifying for the four-candidate ballot. Accepting that any of them would make an agreeable chief minister, Tabai and Roniti Teiwaki agreed not to campaign around the nation as they were already well-known relative to the other two.

The election for chief minister was held on 17 March 1978, and Tabai won with 55.6% of the vote. Like all of the candidates, he received strong support from the district he represented. The more central location of his district mitigated North–South polarisation, and he received one third of the Catholic vote despite being a Protestant in a religiously divided country. He also received the largest share of the union vote. The youngest candidate of the election, Tabai was only 27 years old when he took the office; although elder status was a significant qualifier in Kiribati, voters prioritised his understanding of government. Tabai later said that his university education, a rarity among the Gilbertese people at the time, gave him an electoral advantage.

== Chief minister ==
Tabai carefully balanced his ministry picks when organising his government, ensuring that there was representation for the north, central, and south regions, for both Catholics and Protestants, and for unions. He chose Teannaki as his Vice-President. As chief minister, Tabai was responsible for negotiating the independence of Kiribati. He travelled to London and Washington D.C. in June 1978, leading a delegation that included two ministers, two expatriate civil servants, and two advisers from the Commonwealth Secretariat. Here he negotiated arrangements for financial support from the United Kingdom as the resource that made up the majority of Kiribati's economy, phosphate, was depleted. Also discussed were access to the colonial government's reserve funds, the legal status of Banaba, and American claims in the region. Tabai believed that Australia and New Zealand would be necessary allies after independence, and he criticized them for giving disproportionate aid to the Pacific nations that they had previously held as territories.

As negotiations dragged into October and November, Tabai declared that he would not waver in his opposition to an autonomous Banaba, saying that the Gilbert Islands had the "absolute right to proceed to independence with its territorial integrity intact". He argued this point during the constitutional convention at Marlborough House in November and December. Although the constitution was based on the Westminster system of the United Kingdom, it brought changes to the system that Tabai credited with maintaining the country's stability over the following years, such as an executive president with term limits.

Tabai agreed to an international commission in May 1979 in Suva to address the new constitution and the Banaba issue, further delaying independence. Kiribati achieved independence on 12 July 1979, and Tabai's position of chief minister was renamed president of Kiribati. The large independence celebration was Tabai's first test as the new president, requiring that he manage the many influential figures who visited over the next two days. By this time, he had two children.

== Presidency ==
=== 1979–1982 ===
With an independent nation, Tabai considered it essential that his government could inform the people how the government worked and to get them accustomed to democracy. He was faced with managing an incredibly poor economy between several distant islands, dependent on a foreign nation for its funding. Financial independence became a core ideal motivating the policies of Tabai's government. He enacted a loose policy of austerity with limited spending and moderate privatisation, though he did not enact any spending cuts or tax reform.

Kiribati moved toward a subsistence economy, and it cut funding for public services which included the operation of only a basic primary health care system. Tabai opposed the development of a tourism industry, fearing that the small island nation could be overwhelmed by a surge of wealthy tourists. He instead proposed that they wait "50 or 100 years before talking about such a subject".

Tabai's efforts to promote development and quality of life in the outer islands through the construction of schools and government administration proved unsuccessful. Constitutional law professors Yash Ghai and Jill Cottrell described Tabai's presidency as "quieter" than the neighbouring Pacific leaders who dominated their nations' politics. While president, Tabai continued a practice of climbing a 10-metre-tall coconut tree twice each day to fetch coconut milk, which he said was more economical than buying soft drinks. He considered this a possible career should he fail to be re-elected. Tabai attended the 1979 Commonwealth Heads of Government Meeting in Lusaka shortly after becoming president, where he was the youngest world leader to ever attend a Commonwealth meeting. As president, the United Kingdom granted him an honorary Order of St Michael and St George.

One of the key conflicts of Tabai's presidency began in 1980 when the general workers union Botaki ni Karikirakean Aroia Taan Makuri led a strike. It turned violent, and hundreds of workers lost their jobs. One assemblyman, Bwebwentaratai Benson, passed a motion condemning how Tabai's government handled the strike. This motion was interpreted as a motion of no confidence in Tabai's government, but it failed with 11 votes in favour of the motion and 22 votes against it. The 1982 parliamentary election in March and April became a competition between Tabai's government and the unionists. Of Tabai's nineteen allies in parliament, seven lost their re-election campaigns.

The 1982 presidential election took place on 4 May. Tabai's allies in the House of Assembly gained enough support from independent members to put Tabai and former Vice-President Teatao Teannaki on the ballot, while the unionists aligned with Ratieta's allies to nominate him along with unionist Etera Teangana. Taibai's broad popularity among voters made him a clear favourite to win, and he was re-elected with 48.7% of the vote. His ally Teannaki received 28.5%, further indicating popular support for Tabai's government.

=== 1982–1983 ===
Tabai went into his next term without a majority in the House of Assembly. His government introduced a bill in December to correct a salary discrepancy for six statutory officers, but the opposition challenged it as a means to attack Tabai politically. Tabai responded by tying it to confidence in his government and putting it to a new vote. Tabai's slim majority failed him, and the bill was defeated with 15 voting in support and 20 voting in opposition, triggering new elections. While his government was dissolved, Tabai's role as head of government was taken over by the Council of State, which included the Speaker of the House, the chairman of the Public Service Commission, and the Chief Justice.

The 1983 parliamentary election was held on 12 and 19 January 1983. and it brought Tabai a net increase of two supporters in the House of Assembly, bringing him a majority with 19 of 32 assemblymen. Tabai and Teannaki were again nominated for the ballot in the subsequent presidential election, this time with Harry Tong and Tewareka Tentoa. Tabai disliked the political conflict surrounding him, and it is rumoured that he considered not running until he was talked into seeking re-election. He won re-election with 49.6% of the vote. Teiwaki criticised Tabai for only appointing allies to his new cabinet instead of working with the opposition.

=== 1983–1987 ===
Tabai was chancellor of the University of the South Pacific from 1983 to 1986.

Tabai incited condemnation from Western nations and neighbouring island nations in March 1985, when he began negotiations with the Soviet Union over fishing rights. In exchange for US$1.5 million, he gave Soviet trawlers access to Kiribati's fishing zones for one year. Tabai justified the decision as a means for Kiribati to be self-sufficient and forgo British financial support, saying that fish were the only major resource the nation had. He rebutted fears that this was the first step in building a Soviet land base in Kiribati. The domestic political dispute fell along religious lines, as the Bishop of Tarawa condemned the agreement and rallied Catholics against it as a deal with a godless nation, while Protestants generally supported it. By August, the fishing agreement was signed and the domestic backlash intensified. After Tabai rejected proposals for a referendum, the opposition presented a motion of no confidence, but it failed with 15 supporting and 19 opposing. Tabai signed the agreement in October 1985. Once it was in place, Australia, New Zealand, and the United States began pouring money into the region through financial support and rival fishing rights agreements. The Soviet agreement was not renewed, as Kiribati and the Soviet Union were unable to agree on terms.

Tong filed a legal challenge against Tabai as the 1987 presidential election approached, arguing that Tabai's tenure as chief minister counted as a presidential term, which would mean he had reached his three-term limit and would be ineligible to run again. The High Court ruled that Tong had no legal standing to request an injunction against Tabai, as candidates had not yet been nominated for the ballot and Tong was therefore not an electoral opponent of Tabai. In the 1987 parliamentary election, Tabai was re-elected in the first round of voting. Tong filed a new injunction after they were both nominated on the presidential ballot, but he dropped out before the ruling, so the court found that he again lacked standing against Tabai. Tabai was re-elected as president with 50.1% of the vote, but the opposition gained a larger share than in previous elections, in part because of lingering resentment among voters over the Soviet fishing agreement.

=== 1987–1991 ===
Without a majority in the House of Assembly, Tabai depended on an alliance with the independent assemblymen. Finding that he did not have enough support to effectively control parliament, he removed three of his ministers in July 1987 and replaced them with former supporters who had defected to the Liberal Party. Tabai received an honorary doctorate of law from his alma mater Victoria University while visiting in 1990.

Tabai successfully ran for re-election to his seat in the House of Assembly in the 1991 parliamentary election, but he was term-limited for the presidency and not eligible to run for re-election in the 1991 presidential election. Instead, he leveraged his popularity to campaign for his allies, who labelled themselves the National Progressive Party. Teannaki was put on the ballot as the National Progressive Party's preferred candidate, and he campaigned on a continuation of Tabai's policies. Teannaki succeeded Tabai after winning 46.3% of the vote, demonstrating continued support for Tabai's government. In a 2004 interview, Tabai admitted that he was relieved when his time as president ended.

== Post-presidency ==
=== Secretary-General of the Pacific Islands Forum ===
Tabai was selected as the chancellor of the University of the South Pacific in 1991, and rumours spread that he was seeking the position of Secretary-General of the Pacific Islands Forum. He received the position, becoming Secretary-General on 31 January 1992. Going into the new role, he supported consolidation for the Pacific Islands Forum in contrast to the expansion of the previous decade. Tabai received the highest honour of Kiribati, the Kiribati Grand Order, the same year.

In his first year as Secretary-General, Tabai became the first representative of the Pacific Islands Forum to be invited to the Asia-Pacific Economic Cooperation. He was frustrated by what he felt was neglect from larger nations on the Pacific Rim, saying they regarded the Pacific as "nothing but a vast empty space" that obstructed their interactions with one another. Tabai travelled across the Pacific island nations as Secretary-General, operating under the philosophy that the Secretariat needed to hear the concerns of member nations, and he travelled to other parts of the world to stay attuned to global politics. He was in favour of expanding foreign trade during his tenure, particularly with Asian nations.

Tabai's selection for reappointment as Secretary-General in 1994 drew backlash from the Fijian government, which felt that its own candidate Filipe Bole had been sidelined. It alleged that Tabai failed to apply for reappointment, giving Fiji a false impression that it could submit a candidate. In May 1996, he was appointed an Honorary Officer of the Order of Australia for "service to Australian-Pacific Islands countries relations, particularly as Secretary-General to the South Pacific Forum". Tabai's tenure as Secretary-General of the Pacific Islands Forum ended in 1998. Given the difficulty of getting a job in Kiribati, he decided to return to politics as a member of the House of Assembly.

=== Return to the House of Assembly ===
Tabai planned to start a radio station so that the government would not have a monopoly on news, hoping to have it running before the 1998 election. With the former programme manager of Radio Kiribati, Atiera Tetoa, Tabai co-founded Newair FM 101. After consulting with the government People's Lawyer and confirming that a license was not necessary, they aired a test broadcast with music. The government ordered that it cease operations shortly after, and the police opened an investigation for broadcasting without a license and for constructing a radio antennae without authorisation. The government refused them when they requested a license, and they received fines of $A35 each on 8 December 1999 after pleading guilty to importing and operating radio equipment without authorisation. While he was working on creating a radio station, Tabai founded a newspaper, the Newstar, with his brother and Siau Smith, an I-Kiribati woman from Melbourne. This was the first independently owned media outlet in Kiribati. He believed that independent media was important, arguing that government-controlled media would never be critical of the government. As of 2001, it cost 60 cents and had a circulation of 1,700. Tabai received a radio license in 2002 after he took the government to court.

As a member of the opposition, Tabai was aligned with the Boutokaan te Koaua party. Tabai has spoken in favour of including women in politics. He said that the nation should encourage smaller families of just two or three children in 2014 to address the nation's growing population, arguing that it was a necessary measure to prevent unemployment and to better serve women's and children's health. He later said that encouraging smaller families would help manage challenges to liveability caused by climate change. Along with the rest of the opposition, Tabai opposed the shift of Kiribati's foreign policy to favour of China in 2019, arguing that Taneti Maamau only made the decision to help his government win the next election. Tabai opposed the country's withdrawal from the Pacific Islands Forum in 2022, criticising the government for making the decision without consulting members of parliament or the public. He protested the deportation of the Australian-born judge David Lambourne in 2024, alleging that it was intended to punish Lambourne's wife, opposition leader Tessie Eria Lambourne. Tabai supported a boycott of the 2024 presidential election when no opposition candidates were allowed on the ballot.
