= 1987 Kiribati parliamentary election =

Parliamentary elections were held in Kiribati on 12 March 1987, with a second round on 19 March. All candidates for the 39 seats ran as independents.

== Electoral system ==
The number of seats was increased from 36 to 39, with additional seats given to Abaiang, Maiana and Nikunau due to population increases.

== Results ==
Twenty of the elected MPs were new to Parliament. Sixteen incumbent MPs lost their seats, eight of which were affiliated with opposition leader Harry Tong and two of whom where ministers, Minister for Health and Family Planning Binata Tetaeka and Minister for Trade, Industry and Labour Teewe Arobati.

Party	First round			Second round			Total seats
Party	Votes	%	Seats	Votes	%	Seats	Total seats
Independents			25			14	39
Total			25			14	39
Total votes				19,770	–		
Registered voters/turnout	25,665	–		20,042	98.64		
Source: Nohlen et al., PIM

== Aftermath ==
Following the elections Bereteitari Neeti was elected Speaker of the House of Assembly, defeating previous Speaker Matita Taniera by 20 votes to 19. MPs nominated Ieremia Tabai, Teatao Teannaki and Teburoro Tito to contest the May presidential elections; the result was a victory for Tabai, who received 50.1% of the vote.
