= 1983 Kiribati parliamentary election =

Early parliamentary elections were held in Kiribati on 12 January 1983, with a second round on 19 January. All candidates for the 36 seats ran as independents. Voter turnout was 80%.

== Background ==
After the government of Ieremia Tabai was defeated 20–15 on a bill on equalising civil servants' salaries on 9 December 1982, Tabai brought back the same bill the following day, including a vote of confidence. After the government lost again, early elections were called.

== Results ==
Ten incumbent MPs lost their seats, including Minister for Health Ataraoti Bwebwenibure and Minister for the Line and Phoenix Group Ieremia Tata.

| Party | Votes | % | Seats |
|---|---|---|---|
| Independents | | | 36 |
| Total | | | 36 |
| Total votes | 19,995 | – | |
| Registered voters/turnout | 25,011 | 79.94 | |
Source: Nohlen et al.

== Aftermath ==
In the February presidential election, Tabai was re-elected president. Matita Taniera was re-elected Speaker and Teato Teannaki was appointed Vice President.
