= Babera Kirata =

Kiribati politician

Ratimiti Babera Kirata OBE (1938-1991) was an I-Kiribati politician, elected in the House of Representatives in 1967 for the constituency of Onotoa. He was nominated candidate to the 1978 Gilbertese Chief Minister election. He was born in Onotoa where he was continuously elected MP from 1978 to his death, dying less than one month before the general election of May 1991. He was at that moment one of the possible candidates to the succession of Ieremia Tabai as the Beretitenti. He was one of the founders and the first president of the Gilbertese National Party and later of the National Progressive Party (Kiribati). He had been continuously member of the Cabinet of Kiribati from 1979 to 1991.
