= Taomati Iuta =

I-Kiribati politician (1939–2016)

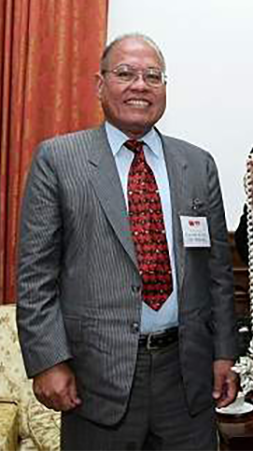
- Iuta in 2008

Speaker of the House of Assembly
- In office 2007–2015
- Preceded by: Etera Teangana
- Succeeded by: Teatao Teannaki
- In office January 2003 – March 2003
- Preceded by: Tekiree Tamuera
- Succeeded by: Etera Teangana

2nd Vice President of Kiribati
- In office 4 July 1991 – 24 May 1994
- President: Teatao Teannaki
- Preceded by: Teatao Teannaki
- Succeeded by: Tewareka Tentoa

Personal details
- Born: 2 May 1939 Beru, Gilbert and Ellice Islands (present-day Kiribati)
- Died: 3 June 2016 (aged 77) Kiribati
- Education: Leicester College

Taomati T. Iuta (2 May 1939 on Beru Island – 5 June 2016) was an I-Kiribati politician. He was Speaker of the House of Assembly of Kiribati for the Ninth Parliament (2011–2015). He was the vice president of Kiribati from 1991 to 1994.

== Early life and career ==
He attended Leicester College in England, at a time when the then-Gilbert Islands were a British territory, then became a teacher at King George V School, a government-run secondary school in the colony. In 1970, he joined the colonial government administration, occupying various positions up to project manager in the Government Development Authority.

He was elected to the first ever Parliament in 1978, as Kiribati prepared for independence. He then stood as candidate for the position of Chief Minister, to lead the country into independence, and was selected by Parliament as one of the four candidates submitted to citizens' vote by universal suffrage. He finished last of the four, with 8.1% of the vote (though he did obtain 66.8% in his own native constituency of Beru). Ieremia Tabai won with 55.5%.

Iuta was continuously re-elected to the House of Assembly until 1998, being returned as MP for Beru in 1978, 1979, 1982, 1987, 1991 and 1994. During that time, he served continuously as a member of Cabinet until 1994, under Presidents Ieremia Tabai and Teatao Teannaki, both from the National Progressive Party. He was, at various times, Minister for Natural Resources Development, Minister for Trade, Industry and Labour, Minister for Transport and Communications, and Minister of Finance and Economic Planning. He also served as Vice President under President Teannaki from 1991 to 1994.

Following the 1991 election, Alaima Talu wrote: "Taomati Iuta is emerging as the key man in the new Government with his extensive experience and superior educational background. There are indications that he is already making a significant impact on the Government's major policies, and has proven to be the most articulate of the Government front-benchers during Parliamentary debates". She went on to suggest that he might be a likely candidate to succeed to the Presidency, although ultimately this did not happen, as the 1991–1994 term was to be his last in Parliament.

He first served as Speaker of the House from January to March 2003. (The Speaker is elected from outside Parliament.) In March, President Teburoro Tito's government was brought down by a parliamentary motion of no confidence, bringing about fresh parliamentary elections, a change in government, and a new election for Speaker. Etera Teangana succeeded to the position. After the 2007 parliamentary election, Iuta stood for the position of Speaker again. Teangana being "a non-starter", Iuta defeated his only opponent, former Cabinet minister Martin Tofinga (who had just lost his seat in Parliament), by twenty-six votes to twenty. Islands Business commented that Iuta was "expected to bring in a higher level of maturity, etiquette, eloquence and more extensive experience into the Speaker’s office than the last incumbent".

In November 2010, he addressed the Tarawa Climate Change Conference to urge delegates to strive for a workable agreement on addressing climate change, a crucial issue of Anote Tong's presidency.

In August 2011, he gave the keynote address for the Mock Parliament for Women, at which thirty women from all over the country "came together [...] at the Maneaba ni Maungatabu (Parliament) for a 3-day parliamentary training for potential candidates" for the 2011 parliamentary election, intended to help remedy women's low rate of participation in national politics. Later describing himself as "very impressed with their performance", he urged women to "believe in their potential" and stand for election.

Following the November 2011 legislative election, he was reelected Speaker by the new Parliament, with the support of 28 MPs (to 18).

== Personal life ==
Iuta was a member of the Kiribati Protestant Church. He was married to Ilaisa Pentusi Iuta.

== Death ==
Iuta died on 3 June 2016 at the age of 77.
