= Radio Kiribati =

National radio network of Kiribati

Radio Kiribati is the national radio network of Kiribati. The station is overseen by the Broadcasting and Publications Authority (BPA).

== History ==
The station started broadcasting in 1954 as Radio Tarawa, callsign VTW, created under the auspices of the Gilbert and Ellice Islands Broadcasting Service. By the early 1970s, the station was broadcasting in English, Gilbertese and Samoan languages, while most of the output consisted of "recordings and BBC transcriptions". During the late 1960s, Bwebwetake Areieta was a producer there.

The station serviced what would become the islands of Tuvalu until 1975, when a separate radio station was created upon its independence. Radio Tarawa served the interests of what remained of the colony until its independence.

During the early 2000s, the station was renamed Radio Kiribati, now put up under the BPA. The station's transmitter broke in 2008 for a few months; in March 2011, it moved from independence-era 846 KHz to 1440 KHz after receiving a Taiwanese grant. Betarim Rimon told Te Uekera that it was its largest achievement.
