= Roniti Teiwaki =

I-Kiribati politician

Roniti Teiwaki is an I-Kiribati politician.

After the 1974 general election, he became member of the Cabinet of the Gilbert and Ellice Islands of Naboua Ratieta as Minister of Education, Training and Culture, then confirmed from March 1978 as Minister for Natural Resource Development in Ieremia Tabai’s cabinet of the Gilbert Islands, after being candidate to 1978 Gilbertese Chief Minister election. He temporarily retired from politics in 1982 for working at the University of South Pacific. He was the opposition candidate to Teatao Teannaki, his brother-in-law, for 1991 Kiribati presidential election. He was also an unsuccessful candidate at the 1994 Kiribati presidential election.
