= Teatao Teannaki =

President of Kiribati (1935–2016)

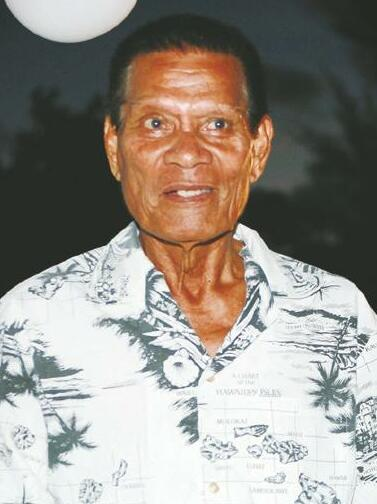
- Teannaki in 2014

Speaker of the House of Assembly
- In office 5 February 2016 – 11 October 2016
- Preceded by: Taomati Iuta
- Succeeded by: Tebuai Uaai

2nd President of Kiribati
- In office 4 July 1991 – 24 May 1994
- Vice President: Taomati Iuta
- Preceded by: Ieremia Tabai
- Succeeded by: Tekiree Tamuera (acting)

1st Vice President of Kiribati
- In office 12 July 1979 – 4 July 1991
- President: Ieremia Tabai; Rota Onorio (acting); Ieremia Tabai
- Preceded by: Position Established
- Succeeded by: Tekiree Tamuera (acting)

Personal details
- Born: 1936 Abaiang, Gilbert and Ellice Islands (present-day Kiribati)
- Died: 11 October 2016 (aged 80) Betio, South Tarawa, Kiribati
- Party: National Progressive Party; Tobwaan Kiribati Party (2016)
- Children: Lavinia Teatao Teem

Teatao Teannaki (1936 – 11 October 2016) was an I-Kiribati politician who served as the 2nd president of Kiribati from 1991 to 1994. He served as Vice-President of Kiribati from 1979 to 1991, and as speaker of the House of Assembly in 2016. He unsuccessfully ran for president three times before winning in the 1991 election, but was removed from office after losing a motion of no confidence in 1994.

== Career ==
Teannaki became Vice-President of Kiribati upon its independence from the United Kingdom in 1979, and served until his election as president of Kiribati. He unsuccessfully ran for president in 1982, 1983, and 1987. Teannaki ran in the 1991 presidential election with the support of the National Progressive Party (NPP). He defeated Roniti Teiwaki by less than 1,000 votes. Teannaki served as president from 1991 to 1994.

Teannaki formed a cabinet with eight ministers and had Taomati Iuta as his minister of finance and vice president. The NPP held 22 seats in the House of Assembly compared to the 19 seats held by the opposition. He lost a motion of no confidence on 24 May 1994, that was held due to alleged misuse of government funds by him and his ministers. Teburoro Tito succeeded him as president.

In 2016, Teannaki was selected to serve as speaker of the House of Assembly. He lost reelection the House of Assembly in the 2016 election.

== Political positions ==
Teannaki opposed nuclear testing in the Pacific Ocean.

== Personal life ==
Teannaki was Catholic. Lavinia Teatao Teem is his daughter. He died from a heart attack on 11 October 2016.

== Works cited ==
=== Books ===
- Swan, Quito (2020). Pauulu's Diaspora: Black Internationalism and Environmental Justice. University Press of Florida. ISBN 9780813066417.
- Nohlen, Dieter; Grotz, Florian; Hartmann, Christof, eds. (2001). Elections in Asia and the Pacific: A Data Handbook. Vol. 2. Oxford University Press. ISBN 9780199249596.

=== Journals ===
- "Election Watch". Journal of Democracy. 2 (4). Johns Hopkins University Press: 132–134. 1991. doi:10.1353/jod.1991.0063. JSTOR jod.1991.0063.
- Camus, Guigone (2022). "Kiribati". The Contemporary Pacific. 34 (1). University of Hawaiʻi Press: 168–176. doi:10.2307/27255262. JSTOR 27255262.
- Trease, Howard (1992). "The 1991 Election in Kiribati". The Journal of Pacific History. 27 (3). Taylor & Francis: 66–73. doi:10.2307/25169146. JSTOR 25169146.

=== News ===
- "Kiribati speaker Teannaki dies". Radio New Zealand. 12 October 2016. Archived from the original on 13 November 2026.
- "Kiribati Speaker of Parliament dies of heart attack". The Guam Daily Post. 13 October 2016. Archived from the original on 13 November 2026.

=== Web ===
- "Lavinia Teatao Teem (Hon.)". Pacific Women in Politics. Archived from the original on 13 November 2026.
