= Speaker of the House of Assembly (Kiribati) =

The House of Assembly of Kiribati has a Speaker, a function adapted from the British Westminster model. The position was established in 1979 by article 71 of the Constitution, when the country became independent from the United Kingdom. It replaced the Speaker of the former House of Representatives existing since 1967, then known as Legislative Council in 1970 and House of Assembly since 1974.

Article 71 states that the Speaker "shall be elected by the members of the Maneaba [House of Assembly] from among persons who are not members of the Maneaba". His or her function is to "preside at each sitting of the Maneaba" (art.72).

The website of the House of Assembly indicates that his "decision on a point of order is final. He is fully entitled to regulate the conduct of business in all matters not provided in the Rules of Procedure. He has the specific power to decide whether a bill or a motion pertains to money matters, which then requires a minister's signification. He may adjourn a sitting if there is no quorum after an objection is raised by a member".

The Speaker is also a member of the Council of State, the purpose of which is to "perform the duties of the Beretitenti and other executive functions of Government when a motion of no confidence in the Beretitenti or the Government is supported in the Maneaba Ni Maungatabu."

== Presidents of the Legislative council then House of Assembly of Gilbert and Ellice Islands ==
Term	Name	Notes
1972–1973	Sir John Osbaldiston Field	
1973–1976	John Hilary Smith	

Reuben Uatioa was the vice-president of the Legislative council and leader of the government business.

== Speakers of the Legislature of Gilbert Islands ==
Term	Name	Notes
1976–1979	Rota Onorio	

== Speakers of the House of Assembly of Kiribati ==
Term	Name	Notes
1979–1982	Rota Onorio	
1982–1987	Matita Taniera	
1987–1994	Beretitara Neeti	
1994–2002	Tekiree Tamuera	
2003	Taomati Iuta	
2003–2007	Etera Teangana	
2007–2015	Taomati Iuta	
2015–2016	Teatao Teannaki	
2016–2020	Tebuai Uaai	
2020–2024	Tangariki Reete	
2024–	Willie Tokataake	
