= 1982 Kiribati parliamentary election =

Parliamentary elections were held in Kiribati on 26 March 1982, with a second round on 1 April. All candidates for the 36 seats ran as independents. In the constituency of Banaba there was only one candidate, who was returned without an election taking place. Voter turnout was 82.5%.

== Results ==
Party	Votes	%	Seats	+/–
Independents			36	+1
Total			36	+1
Total votes	18,826	–		
Registered voters/turnout	22,816	82.51		
Source: Nohlen et al
