= 1991 Kiribati parliamentary election =

Parliamentary elections were held in Kiribati on 8 May 1991, with a second round on 16 May. All candidates for the 39 seats ran as independents, with more than 15 of the incumbent MPs losing their seats. Voter turnout was 65.9%.

== Results ==
Party	Votes	%	Seats
Independents			39
Total			39
Total votes	19,285	–	
Registered voters/turnout	29,251	65.93	
Source: Nohlen et al.
