= Marakei =

Atoll in the North Gilbert Islands

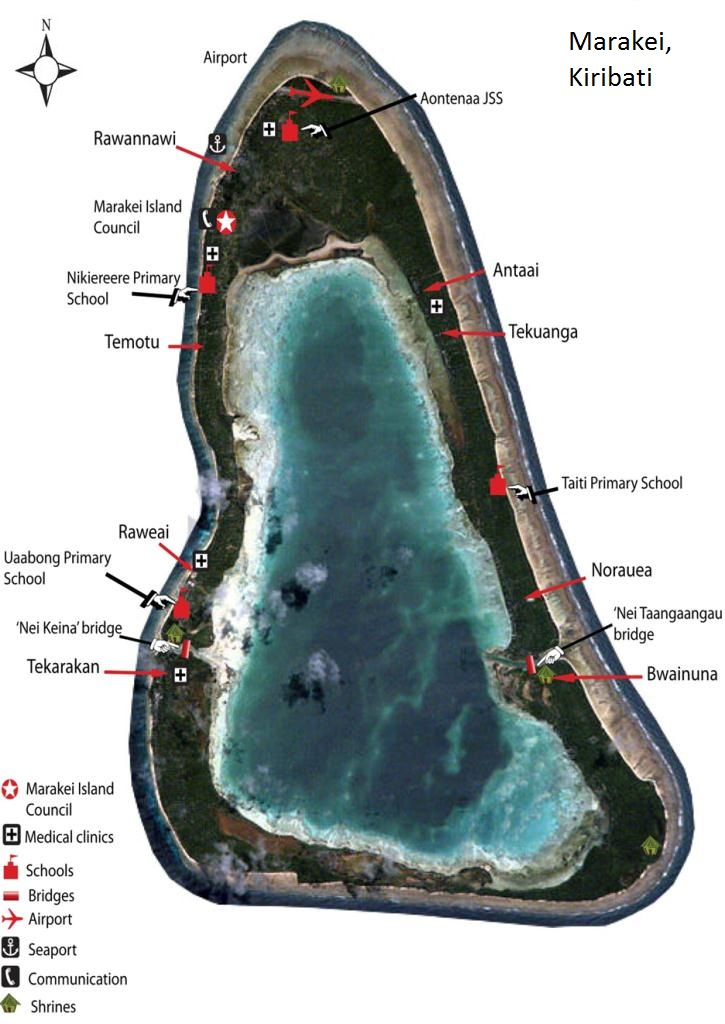
- Map of Marakei

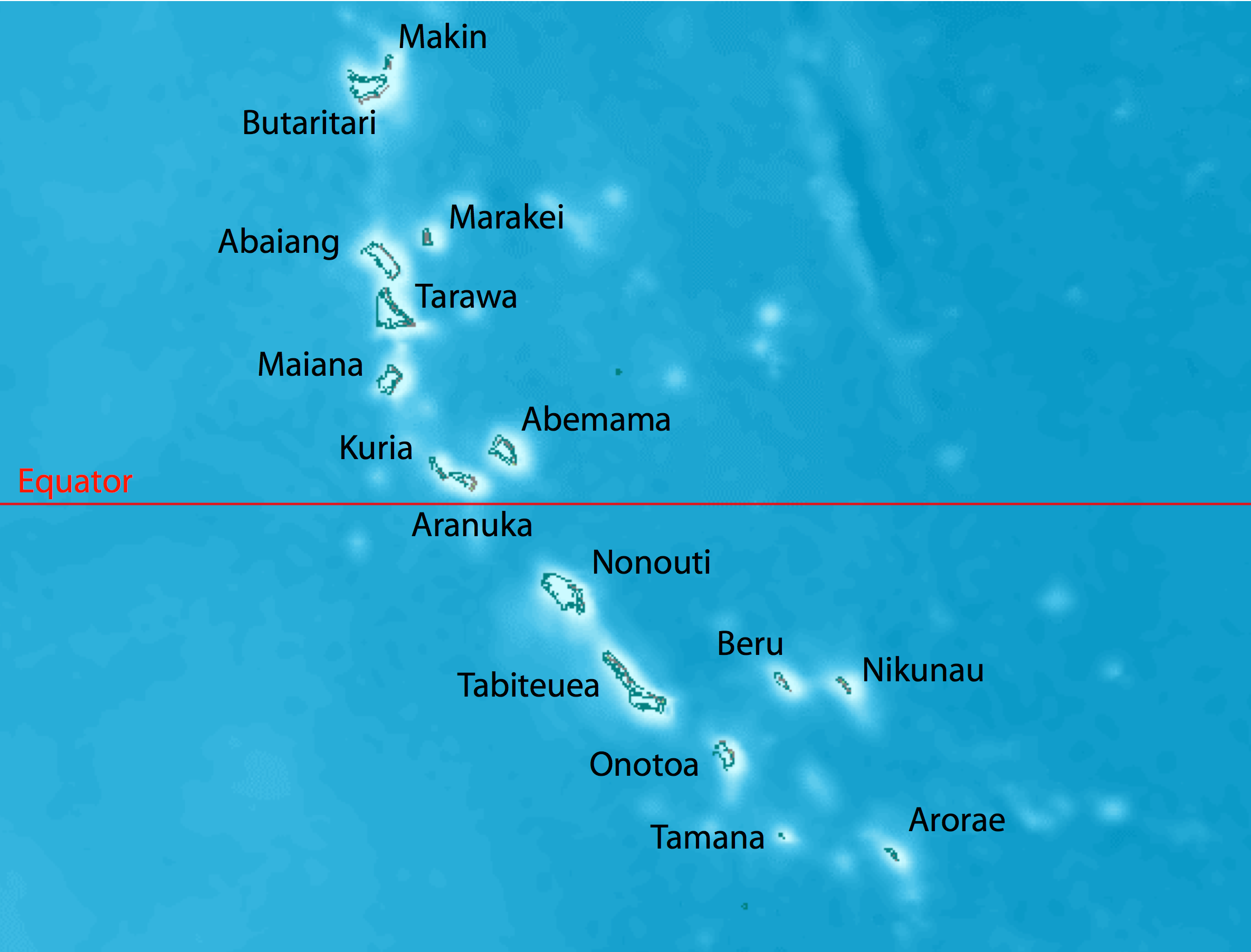

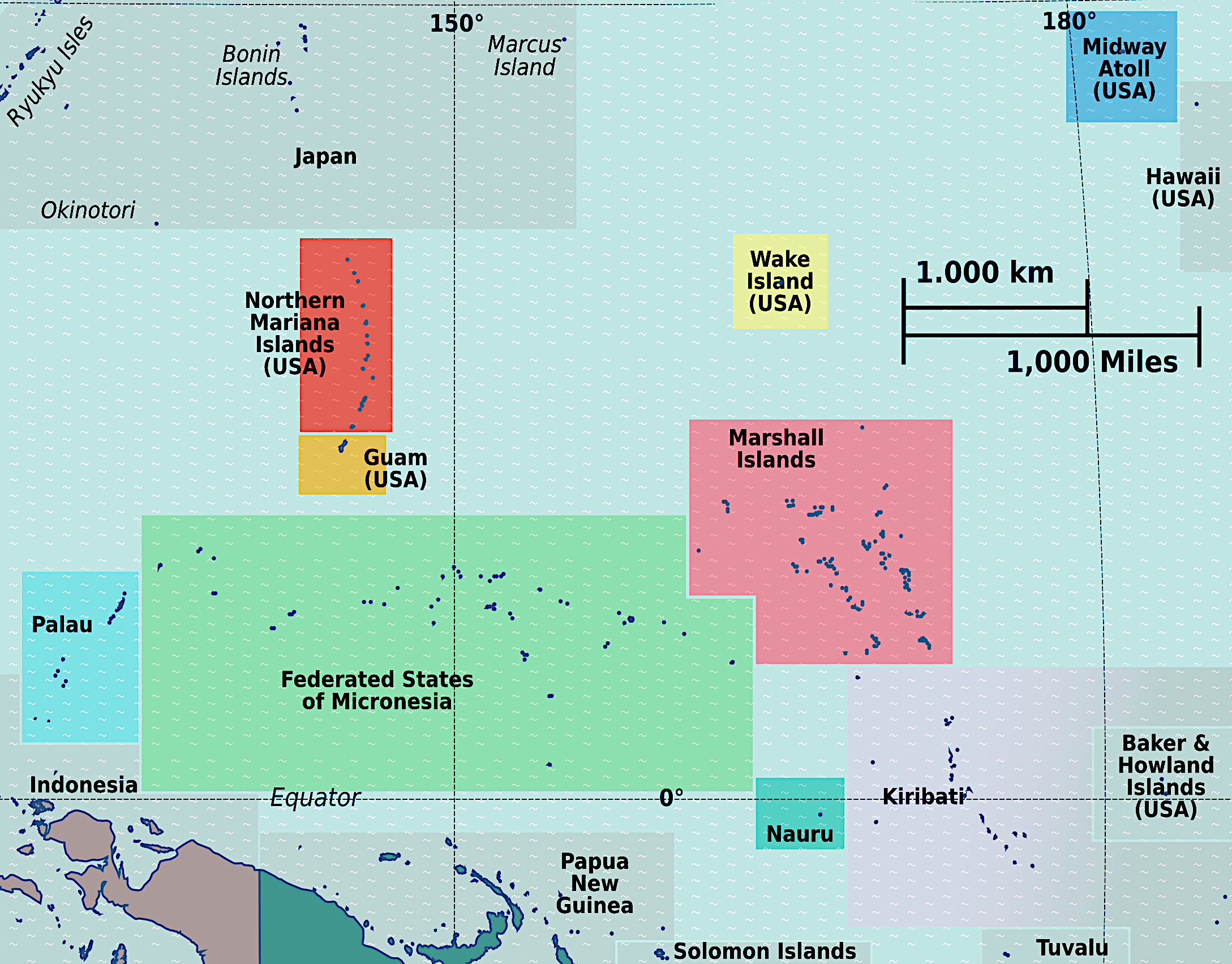
- Location within Kiribati Location within Micronesia Location within Oceania Location within Pacific Ocean

Geography
- Location: Pacific Ocean
- Coordinates: 2°00′N 173°16′E
- Archipelago: Gilbert Islands
- Area: 14.13 km^{2} (5.46 sq mi)
- Highest elevation: 3 m (10 ft)

Administration
- Kiribati

Demographics
- Population: 2,799 (2015 Census)
- Pop. density: 203/km^{2} (526/sq mi)
- Ethnic groups: I-Kiribati 98.4%

Marakei is a small atoll in the North Gilbert Islands. It consists of a central lagoon with numerous deep basins, surrounded by two large islands separated by two narrow channels. The atoll covers approximately 40 square kilometres (15 sq mi).

== Geography ==
Marakei's total land area is 14.13 square kilometres (5.46 sq mi). A 26-kilometre (16 mi.) road circles the island. Its length, from the airport, across the lagoon to Teraereke at the island's southern portion, is 9.93 kilometres (6.17 mi). Its greatest width is at the village of Rawannawi, and narrowest width at Temotu on the island's western side. It is one of only two islands in Kiribati that encircles its lagoon. The Marakei lagoon contains salt water and is deep in some areas, but not tidal. Two narrow channels, Baretoa Pass and Raweta Pass, link the lagoon with the sea and are not navigable at low tide.

Rawata Pass was the location of an obstruction in 1912 after an inter-village conflict.

=== Environmental issues ===
The construction of causeways caused a significant reduction in the flushing of the lagoon, reducing the water's oxygen levels so that fish are no longer found in it. Erosion and accretion along the shoreline has been linked to aggregate mining, and land reclamation and causeway construction are believed to have changed the currents along the shoreline.

=== Villages ===
The main village is Rawannawi, which was home to just over a third of the island's 2,872 people at the 2010 census.

Rawannawi	1000 inhabitants
Temotu	164 inhabitants
Buota	339 inhabitants
Tekarakan	358 inhabitants
Bwainuna	310 inhabitants
Norauea	321 inhabitants
Tekuanga	217 inhabitants
Antai	163 inhabitants

== Myths and legends ==
Various stories are told about the creation of Marakei and the other islands in the Southern Gilberts. An important legend in the culture of Marakei is that spirits who lived in a tree in Samoa migrated northward, carrying branches from the tree, Te Kaintikuaba ("the Tree of Life"), and that it was these spirits, together with Nareau the Wise, who created the islands of Tungaru (the Gilbert Islands). (Note: Sir Arthur Grimble, cadet administrative officer in the Gilberts from 1914 and resident commissioner of the Gilbert and Ellice Islands colony from 1926, recorded the myths and oral traditions of the Kiribati people. He wrote the best-sellers A Pattern of Islands (London, John Murray 1952, and Return to the Islands (1957), which was republished by Eland, London in 2011, ISBN 978-1-906011-45-1. He also wrote Tungaru Traditions: writings on the atoll culture of the Gilbert Islands, University of Hawaii Press, Honolulu, 1989, ISBN 0-8248-1217-4.)

== History ==
The Marakei post office opened around 1912.

== Visiting Marakei ==
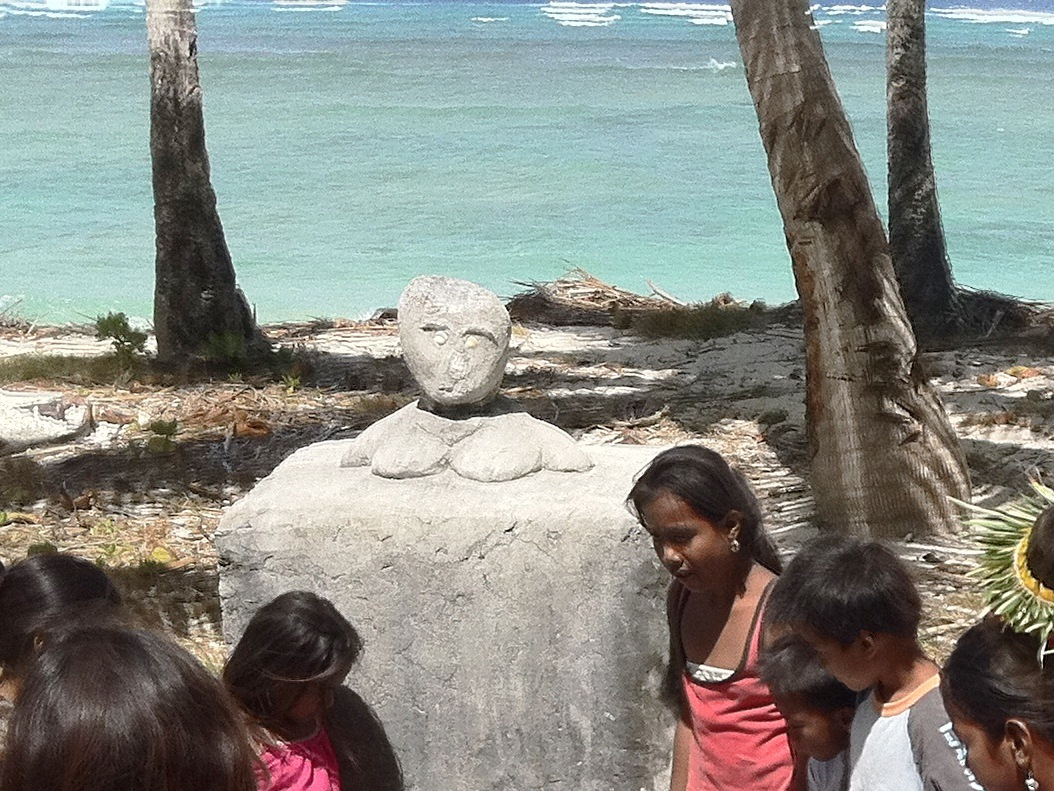
Shrine of one of the four "ghosts" of Marakei

Te katabwanin is a tradition unique to Marakei. Before engaging in any other activities, first-time visitors must pay their respects to the four female guardian spirits or goddesses of Marakei (sometimes called "the ghosts" or "the witches" by locals), traveling counterclockwise around the island, and placing an offering at each spirit's shrine. It is believed that offerings of tobacco, sweets or money at the shrines of Nei Reei, Nei Rotebenua, Nei Tangangau and Nei Naantekimam will secure a happy stay in Marakei. Neglecting te katabwanin is not recommended.

=== Airport ===
Marakei is served by Marakei Airport at the island's northern tip, close to the village of Rawannawi. Air Kiribati operates three flights each week to Abaiang and the international airport at Tarawa.

=== Accommodation ===
The Council guesthouse on Marakei overlooks the ocean, just outside the main village of Rawannawi. Like all Island Council guesthouses in Kiribati, its facilities are basic and food is what is available locally; however its spectacular location and the Marakei tradition of hospitality mean that a visit can be a once-in-a-lifetime experience for the well prepared traveler.
