= Onotoa =

Atoll in Kiribati

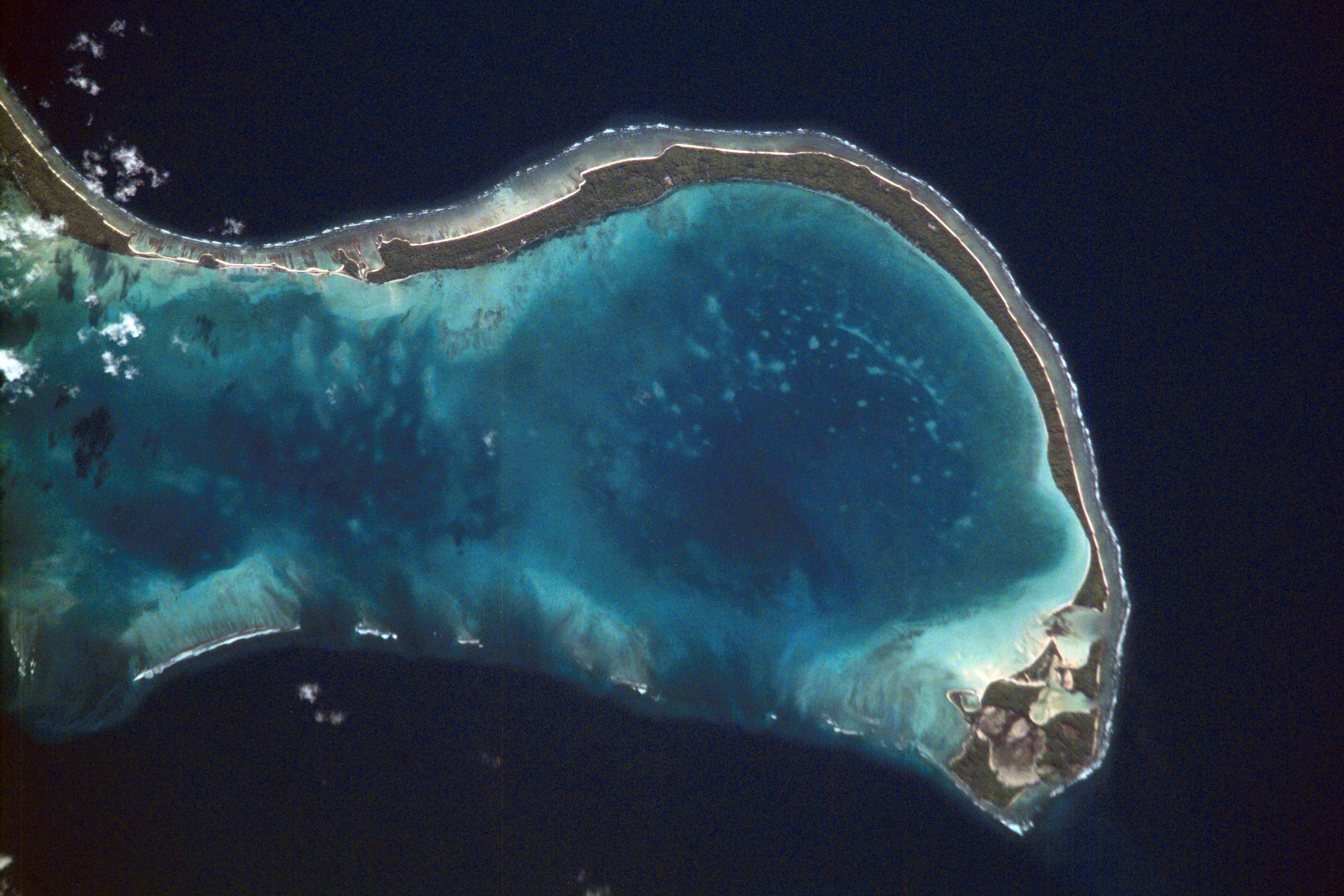
- Onotoa Atoll

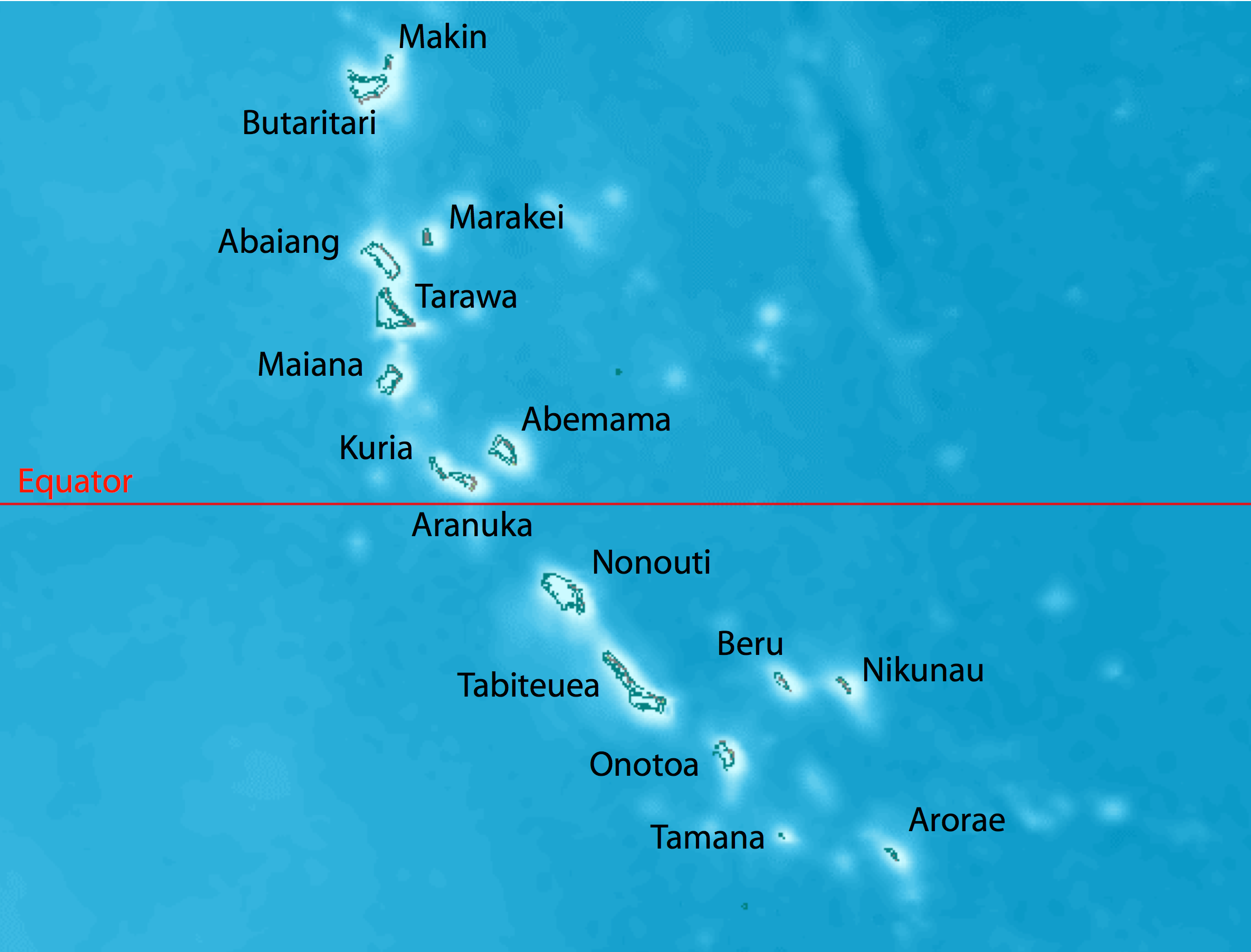

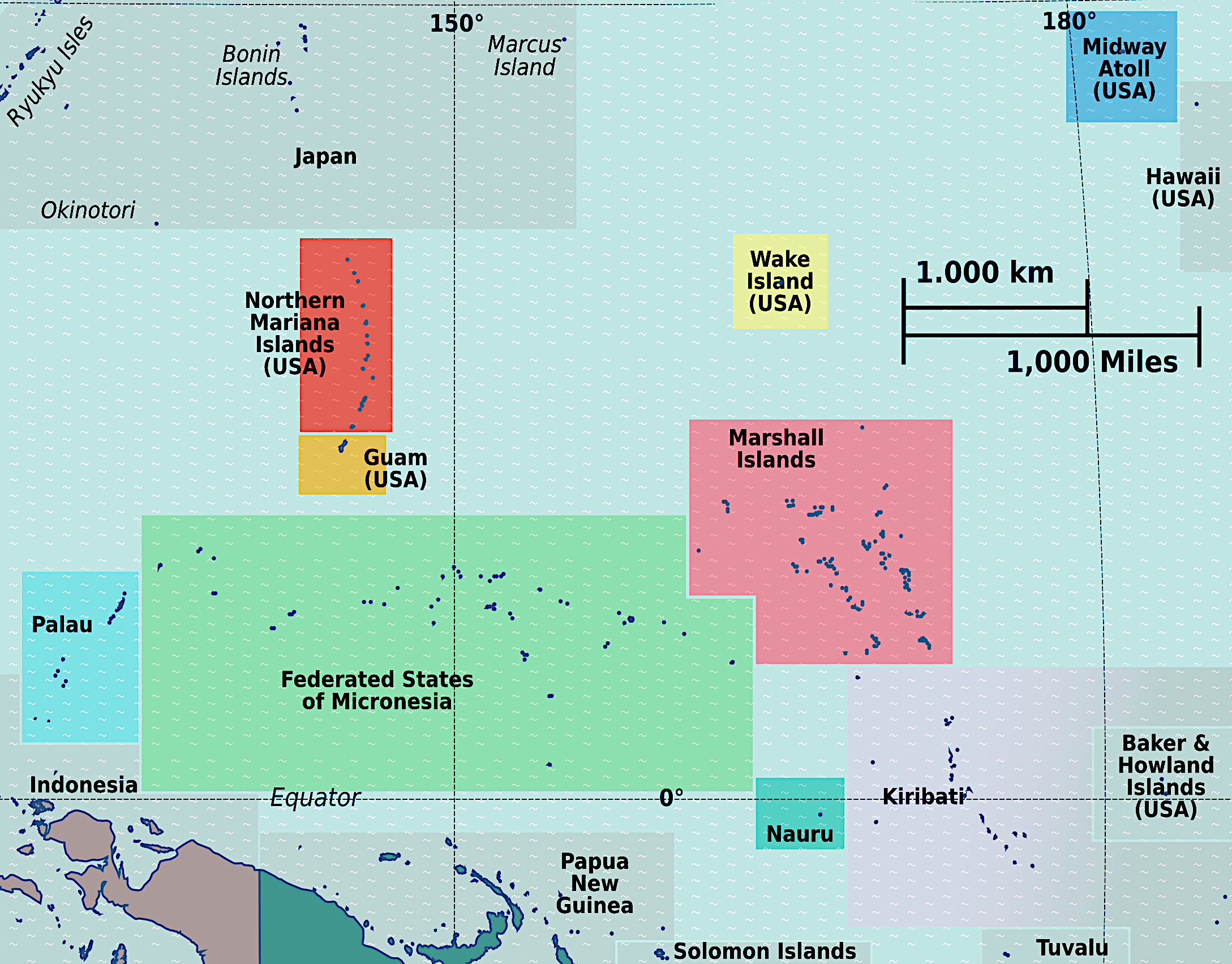
- Location within Kiribati Location within Micronesia Location within Oceania Location within Pacific Ocean

Geography
- Location: Pacific Ocean
- Coordinates: 1°51′S 175°33′E
- Archipelago: Gilbert Islands

Administration
- Kiribati

Demographics
- Population: 1,417 (2020 Census)
- Ethnic groups: I-Kiribati 99.7%

Onotoa is an atoll of Kiribati. It is situated in the Gilbert Islands in the Pacific Ocean, 65 km (40 mi) from Tamana, the smallest island in the Gilberts. The population of Onotoa in the 2020 census was 1,417.

The atoll is similar to many other atolls in the Gilbert Islands with its continuous line of islets and islands on the eastern side. The western side consists of a submerged reef which surrounds the islet-filled lagoon.

== Geography ==
Onotoa is a low-lying atoll with a land area of 15.62 square kilometres (6.03 sq mi). It has 7 villages, with Tabuarorae, an islet, located at the southernmost end of the island followed by Aiaki, Otoae, Temao, Buariki, Tanaeang and Tekawa at the northernmost end of the island. The villages are located along the lagoon coastal area throughout the island. The combined islets of Otoae and Aiaki are now easily accessible after the construction of a causeway from Temao to Aiaki. Tabuarorae is also connected to the rest of the island following the construction of a causeway.

Facilities are spread right across the island, with Onotoa Airport close to the northernmost village of Tekawa, the boat channel and wharf at the southern islet of Tabuarorae, the Junior Secondary School located between Otoae and Aiaki, and the main Council offices located between Temao and Buariki.

== Environmental issues ==
The construction of causeways have resulted in a significant reduction in the flushing of the lagoon that has led to low levels of oxygen in the lagoon and, ultimately, a lowering in the water quality. The erosion and accretion that are occurring along the shoreline are identified as being linked to aggregate mining, land reclamation and the construction of causeways that has been thought to change the currents along the shoreline.

== Oral tradition ==
The name Onotoa means 'six giants'. The legend is told that a hunchback woman in the village of Nuatabu, Tarawa, had six sons, who made fun of her deformity. She ran away to Onotoa. Repentant, the sons followed her and built her a home by piling up huge coral boulders, the remnants of which can still be seen today. (Note: Sir Arthur Grimble, cadet administrative officer in the Gilberts from 1914 and resident commissioner of the Gilbert and Ellice Islands colony from 1926, recorded the myths and oral traditions of the Kiribati people. He wrote the best-sellers A Pattern of Islands (London, John Murray 1952, and Return to the Islands (1957), which was republished by Eland, London in 2011, ISBN 978-1-906011-45-1. He also wrote Tungaru Traditions: writings on the atoll culture of the Gilbert Islands, University of Hawaii Press, Honolulu, 1989, ISBN 0-8248-1217-4.)

== History ==
In 1826 Captain Clark of the British whaling ship John Palmer was the first European to sight Onotoa, followed by Captain Chase of the American whaling ship, Japan.

Onotoa Post Office opened around 1912.

== Notable residents ==
- Taneti Mamau, president of Kiribati
- Babera Kirata, longtime representative of Onotoan people at the House of Parliament (1977 to 1991).
- Tewareka Tentoa, served as vice-president of Kiribati
