= Beru (atoll) =

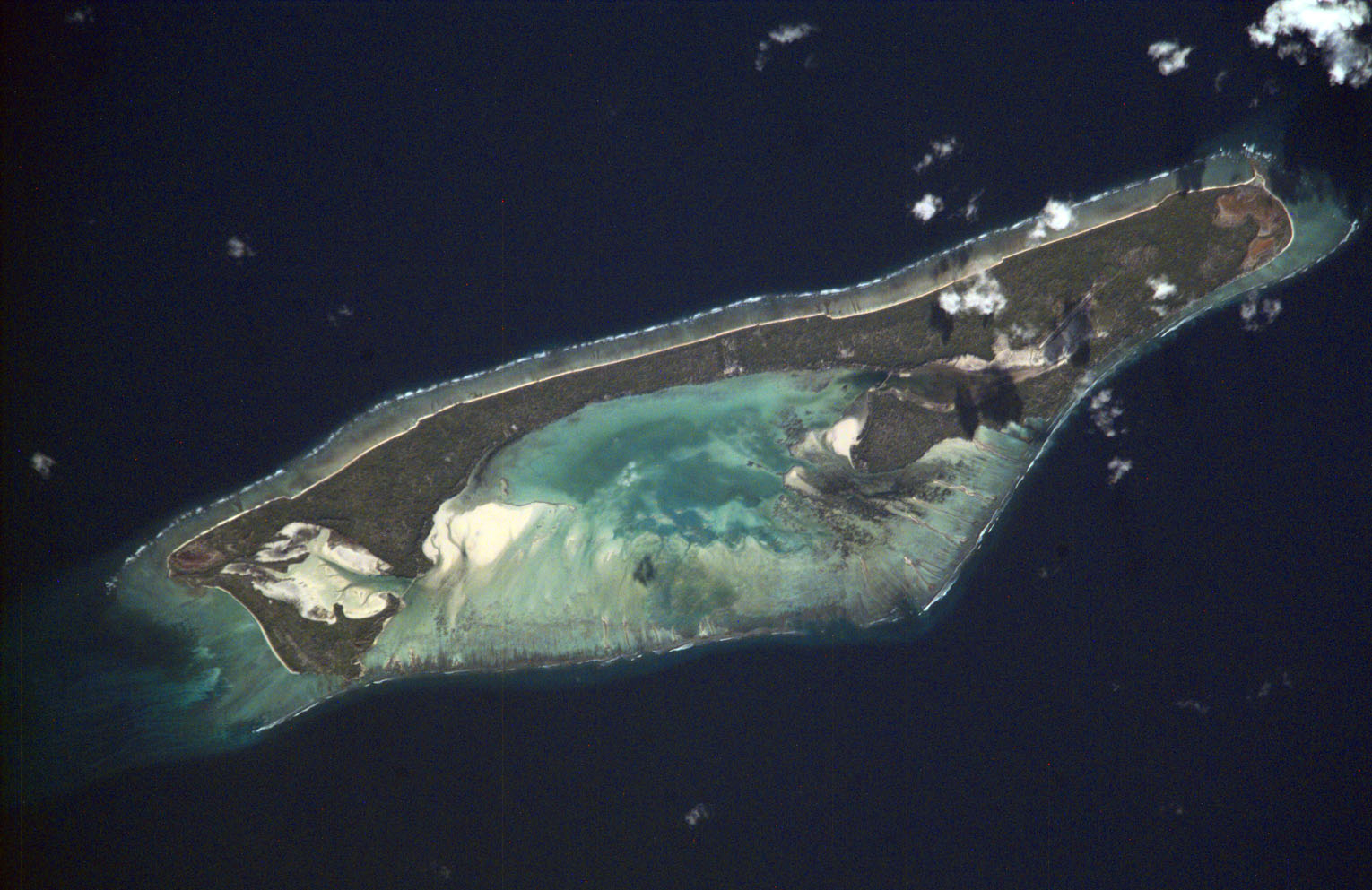
- Beru Atoll

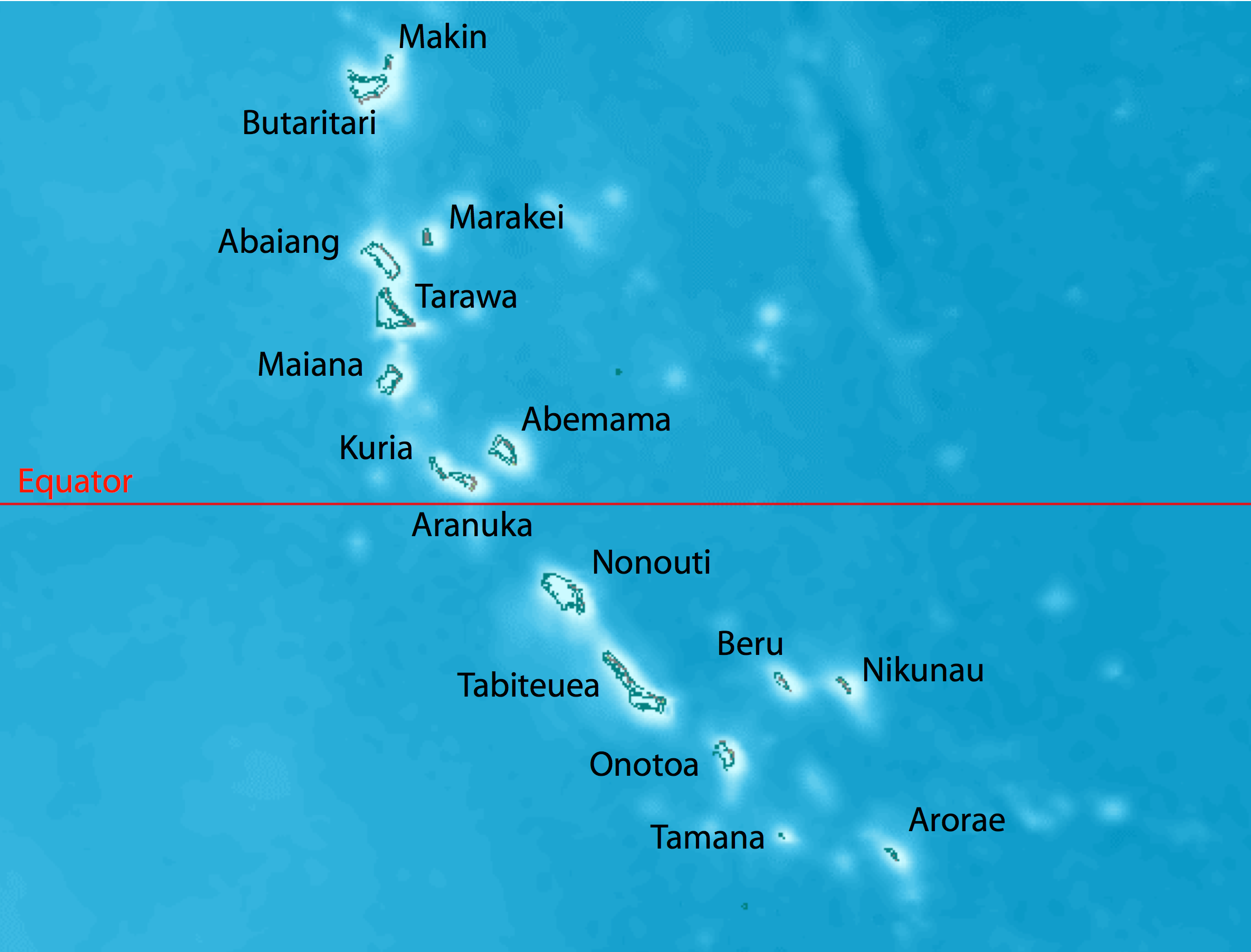

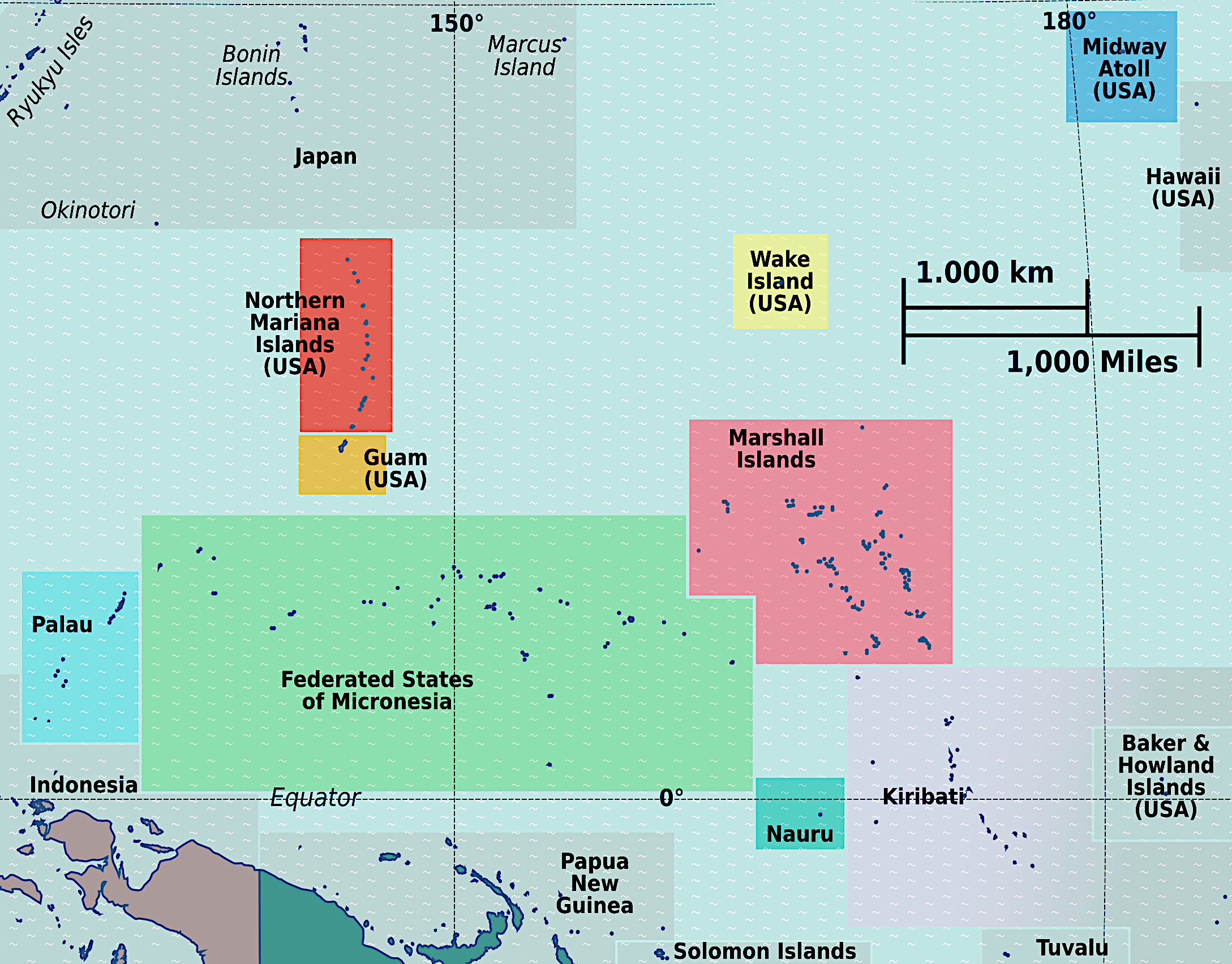
- Location within Kiribati Location within Micronesia Location within Oceania Location within Pacific Ocean

Geography
- Location: Pacific Ocean
- Coordinates: 1°19′S 175°58′E
- Archipelago: Gilbert Islands

Administration
- Kiribati
- Capital: Utiroa
- Former capital: Buariki

Demographics
- Population: 2,051 (2015 Census)
- Ethnic groups: I-Kiribati 99.7%

Beru is an atoll in the Southern Gilbert Islands in the Pacific Ocean, part of the Republic of Kiribati. Beru was previously known as Eliza, Francis Island, Maria, Peroat, Peru Island or Sunday. It is part of a larger reef with the Nuka Lagoon at its center, and the nearest island is Nikunau. The Tabiang Lagoon is present in the north. Beru is home to 2,051 inhabitants (2015 census). Due to sea surges, the atoll is experiencing coastal erosion along with damages to seawalls.

== Etymology ==
Beru means gecko in Gilbertese and its pronunciation is similar to Peru, with a P (there is no P sound in Gilbertese).

== Geography ==
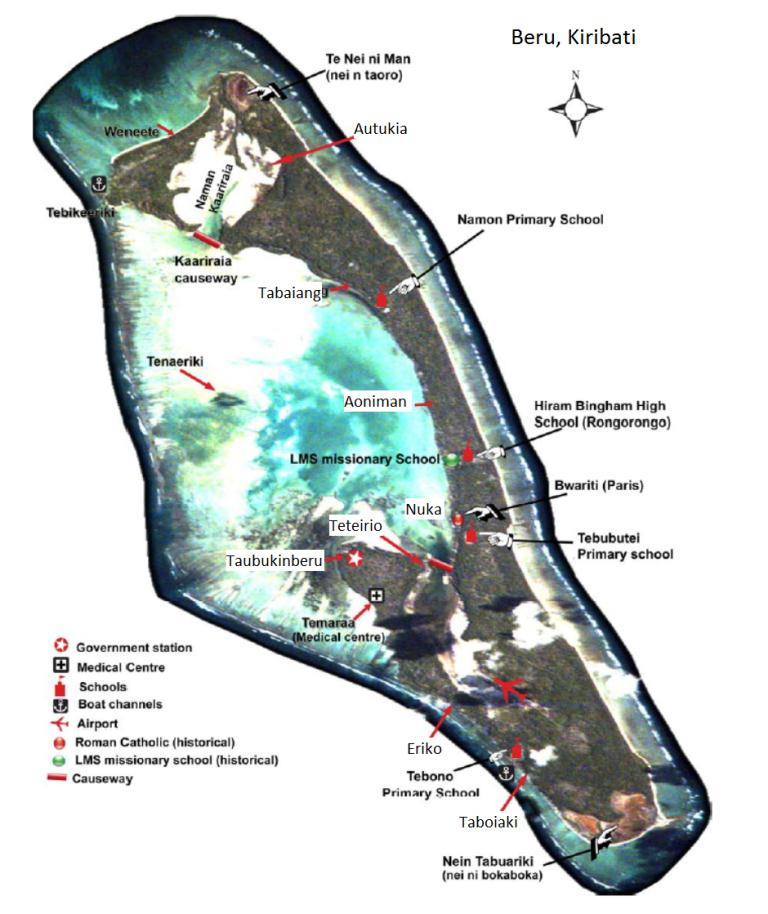
Map of Beru Atoll

Beru is part of a larger reef, some 15 kilometres (9 mi) long (NW-SE) and 4.75 kilometres (3 mi) wide at the widest point (NE-SW). The center of the reef is a shallow depression called Nuka Lagoon. The land mass occupies fully a third or more of the shallow reef structure and is positioned mostly towards the northeast edge of the reef. In maximum dimension the islet is 13.9 kilometres (9 mi) long, and varies in width between 0.5 km (0 mi) and 2.9 km (2 mi).

Extensive spit development has created the nearly enclosed Tabiang Lagoon at the north end where mangroves are present. A small lagoon or barachois at the northern tip is surrounded by man-made fishponds to hold Milkfish, as is a similar feature at the south end of the islet. A 3 km (2 mi) long barachois with extensive mangroves occupies the interior south of Nuka Lagoon. A causeway is present across the inlet mouth and a landing strip is present on the interior flats. The Nuka Lagoon, has a broad passage entering it.

The island is 96 km (60 mi) east of Tabiteuea Atoll and 426 km (265 mi) southeast of Tarawa Atoll and is located near the equator (1°20' S latitude). The closest island to Beru is the island of Nikunau. The island is served by Beru Island Airport.

== Settlements ==
- Autukia
- Tabiang
- Aoniman
- Rongorongo
- Nuka
- Teteirio
- Taubukinberu
- Eriko
- Taboiaki

== Environmental issues ==
The windward side of the atoll is experiencing coastal erosion due to wave action. The Leeward side of the atoll has the shallow lagoon, which the islanders have experienced becoming shallower that is linked to mud-sand accretion that is thought to be the result of the causeways. The construction of causeways has been thought to change the currents in the lagoon and along the shoreline. Frequent and stronger sea surges are damaging the seawalls that have been constructed by the islanders. Aggregate mining and the removal of coral boulders is exacerbating erosion.

== Myths and legends ==
There are different stories told as to the creation of Beru and the other islands in the Southern Gilberts. An important legend in the culture of Beru is that spirits who lived in a tree in Samoa migrated northward carrying branches from the tree Te Kaintikuaba (the tree of life). It was these spirits, together with Nareau the Wise, who created the islands of Tungaru (the Gilbert Islands). (Note: Sir Arthur Grimble, cadet administrative officer in the Gilberts from 1914 and resident commissioner of the Gilbert and Ellice Islands colony from 1926, recorded the myths and oral traditions of the Kiribati people. He wrote the best-sellers A Pattern of Islands (London, John Murray 1952, and Return to the Islands (1957), which was republished by Eland, London in 2011, ISBN 978-1-906011-45-1. He also wrote Tungaru Traditions: writings on the atoll culture of the Gilbert Islands, University of Hawaii Press, Honolulu, 1989, ISBN 0-8248-1217-4.)

== History ==
Beru Post Office opened around 1911.

== Education ==
The island has the one Christian senior high school, Hiram Bingham High School.
