= List of shipwrecks in 1815 =

The list of shipwrecks in 1815 includes ships sunk, wrecked or otherwise lost during 1815.

table of contents
1815
Jan	Feb	Mar	Apr
May	Jun	Jul	Aug
Sep	Oct	Nov	Dec
Unknown date

== January ==
=== 1 January ===
List of shipwrecks: 1 January 1815
Ship	State	Description
Flora	Denmark	The ship was wrecked near Calais, France. She was on a voyage from Copenhagen, Denmark to Saint Thomas, Virgin Islands.

=== 2 January ===
For the loss of the Prussian ship Nimrod on this day, see the entry for 29 December 1814.

=== 3 January ===
List of shipwrecks: 3 January 1815
Ship	State	Description
Atalanta	United Kingdom	War of 1812: The privateer Lawrence (United States) captured and burnt the schooner, which was on a voyage from Halifax, Nova Scotia, British North America to Martinique.
Henrietta	Denmark	The ship was driven ashore and wrecked at Ringkøbing. She was on a voyage from Ramsgate, Kent, United Kingdom to Copenhagen.
Oscar	Sweden	The ship struck the Kentish Knock and was abandoned. She was on a voyage from Uddevalla to Gibraltar. Oscar was subsequently taken in to Ramsgate.
William	United Kingdom	The ship was driven ashore in Tramore Bay. She was on a voyage from Newfoundland, British North America to "Ross". William was refloated on 6 January and taken in to Passage West, County Cork.

=== 5 January ===
List of shipwrecks: 5 January 1815
Ship	State	Description
Charles	United Kingdom	The ship was destroyed by fire whilst on a voyage from Livorno, Kingdom of Etruria to London. Her crew were rescued by HMS Ethalion (Royal Navy).
Unnamed	United Kingdom	The galiot was wrecked at Aberdeen with the loss of a crew member.

=== 6 January ===
List of shipwrecks: 6 January 1815
Ship	State	Description
Barcelones	Spain	The ship was lost in the Bahamas. She was on a voyage from Cádiz, Spain to Trinidad.
Bush & Dreghorn	United Kingdom	The ship was lost near the "Tower of Montreuil". She was on a voyage from Naples to Gallipoli, Apulia.
Triton	United Kingdom	The ship was in collision with a galiot in the North Sea off Cromer, Norfolk. She consequently foundered with the loss of two of her crew.

=== 7 January ===
List of shipwrecks: 7 January 1815
Ship	State	Description
Leicester	United Kingdom	The transport ship was driven onto a rock at Jersey, Channel Islands and was wrecked.

=== 8 January ===
List of shipwrecks: 8 January 1815
Ship	State	Description
Hienrika	(Russia) Grand Duchy of Finland	The ship ran aground on the Goodwin Sands, Kent, United Kingdom and was severely damaged. She was on a voyage from Lovisa to Bordeaux, Gironde, France. Hienrika was later refloated and taken in to Ramsgate, Kent.

=== 9 January ===
List of shipwrecks: 9 January 1815
Ship	State	Description
Elizabeth	United Kingdom	The ship was driven ashore on the Hurst Spit, Hampshire. She was on a voyage from Waterford to Portsmouth, Hampshire. She was refloated and taken in to Cowes, Isle of Wight.
Hero	United Kingdom	The ship was in collision with Venus (United Kingdom) in the North Sea off Great Yarmouth, Norfolk and sank with the loss of two of her crew. She was on a voyage from Oporto, Portugal to Newcastle upon Tyne, Northumberland.
Industry	United Kingdom	The ship was driven ashore and wrecked near Holyhead, Anglesey. She was on a voyage from Cork (city) to Dublin.
Roscius	United Kingdom	The ship struck a rock off St Martin's, Isles of Scilly. She was on a voyage from Cork to Falmouth, Cornwall. She put in to the isles of Scilly.
Wilhelmina Frederica	Sweden	The ship departed from Saint Barthélemy for Gothenburg. No further trace, presumed foundered with the loss of all hands.
Zyfard	France	The ship was wrecked in Fontarabia Bay. She was on a voyage from Dunkerque, Nord to Bayonne, Basses-Pyrénées.

=== 10 January ===
List of shipwrecks: 10 January 1815
Ship	State	Description
Gold Hunter	United Kingdom	The transport ship was wrecked at Lisbon, Portugal. All on board were rescued.
Margaret	United Kingdom	The ship was wrecked in Cullen Bay with the loss of 22 of the 24 people on board. She was on a voyage from Londonderry to Greenock.
Mary	United Kingdom	The ship foundered in the North Sea off the mouth of the River Humber, United Kingdom, with the loss of all hands. She was on a voyage from King's Lynn, Norfolk to Gainsborough, Lincolnshire.
Wenshambminde	Norway	The ship was driven ashore and wrecked on Yell, Shetland Islands. Her crew were rescued. She was on a voyage from Trondheim to Liverpool, Lancashire, United Kingdom.
Wilhelmina	Norway	The ship was driven ashore and wrecked at Fécamp, Seine-Inférieure, France.

=== 11 January ===
List of shipwrecks: 11 January 1815
Ship	State	Description
Arianus Marinas	Dutch East India Company	The East Indiaman capsized at Rotterdam, South Holland, Netherlands. She was declared a total loss.
Armin	United Kingdom	The ship was driven ashore and wrecked at Wainfleet, Lincolnshire.
Captain Jackson	United Kingdom	The full-rigged ship was run down and sunk in Bridlington Bay by the full-rigged ship Peggy (United Kingdom). She was on a voyage from London to Bridlington, Yorkshire.
Fortitude	United Kingdom	The ship ran aground on the Isle of Rhum. Her crew were rescued. She was on a voyage from Greenock, Renfrewshire to Hamburg.
Hawk	United Kingdom	The ship foundered in the North Sea off Spurn Point, Yorkshire. Her crew were rescued. She was on a voyage from South Shields, County Durham to London.
Mary Ann	United Kingdom	The ship was driven ashore and wrecked near Winterton-on-Sea, Norfolk with the loss of all hands. She was on a voyage from Hull, Yorkshire to London.
Rose	United Kingdom	The ship was driven ashore at Girvan, Ayrshire. Her crew were rescued.
Sheffield	United Kingdom	The brig was driven ashore and wrecked at Wells-next-the-Sea, Norfolk. Her crew were rescued. She was on a voyage from Thorne, Yorkshire to London.
Sir John Moore	United Kingdom	The ship was driven ashore at Den Helder, North Holland, Netherlands. She was on a voyage from Greenock to Rotterdam. Sir John Moore was refloated on 13 January and taken in to Texel, North Holland.
Twee Gebroeders	Netherlands	The schuyt was driven ashore and wrecked at Freiston, Lincolnshire with the loss of three lives.
Udny	United Kingdom	The schooner departed from Aberdeen for Sunderland, County Durham. No further trace; presumed foundered in the North Sea with the loss of all hands.

=== 12 January ===
List of shipwrecks: 12 January 1815
Ship	State	Description
General Wellesley	United Kingdom	War of 1812: The East Indiaman, which had been captured by the privateer Yankee (United States) on 7 December 1814, was wrecked at Charleston, South Carolina, United States with the loss of more than 50 of her crew. She had been on a voyage from London to Batavia, Netherlands East Indies at the time of her capture.
Laurel	United Kingdom	The ship foundered in the North Sea 40 leagues (120 nautical miles (220 km)) north of Texel, North Holland, Netherlands. Her ten crew were rescued by a French fishing smack. She was on a voyage from Ostend, Netherlands, to Gravesend, Kent.

=== 13 January ===
List of shipwrecks: 13 January 1815
Ship	State	Description
Hansens Haab	Norway	The ship was wrecked on the Dutch coast. She was on a voyage from Larvik to London, United Kingdom.
Jane	United Kingdom	The ship was driven ashore and wrecked at Corton, Suffolk. The Lowestoft Lifeboat rescued her crew. She was on a voyage from Hull, Yorkshire, United Kingdom to London.
Laurel	United Kingdom	The ship was abandoned in the North Sea 100 nautical miles (190 km) south west of Texel, North Holland, Netherlands. She was on a voyage from London to Newcastle upon Tyne, Northumberland.
Neptunus	United Kingdom	The ship was driven ashore at Calais, France. She was on a voyage from Cork to Dram, Norway. She was refloated on 30 January.

=== 14 January ===
List of shipwrecks: 14 January 1815
Ship	State	Description
John	United Kingdom	The ship was driven ashore at Wells-next-the-Sea, Norfolk. She was on a voyage from London to Sunderland, County Durham. She was refloated.
Lord Wellington	United Kingdom	War of 1812: The ship was captured and burnt by the privateer Expedition (United States).
Sarah	United Kingdom	The ship was wrecked at Havana, Cuba. She was on a voyage from Jamaica to Havana and Halifax, Nova Scotia, British North America.
Supply	United Kingdom	The ship was driven ashore at Wells-next-the-Sea, Norfolk. Her crew were rescued.

=== 15 January ===
List of shipwrecks: 15 January 1815
Ship	State	Description
Neptune	United Kingdom	The ship was wrecked on Grand Manan Island, British North America. She was on a voyage from Saint John, New Brunswick, British North America to Demerara.
Neptune	(United Kingdom of Great Britain and Ireland) Jersey	The ship foundered off Otranto, Kingdom of Sicily. She was on a voyage from Naples, Kingdom of Sicily to Cádiz, Spain.

=== 16 January ===
List of shipwrecks: 16 January 1815
Ship	State	Description
Bengal	British East India Company	The East Indiaman was destroyed by fire at Point de Galle, Ceylon with the loss of one life.

=== 17 January ===
List of shipwrecks: 17 January 1815
Ship	State	Description
Active	United Kingdom	The ship was wrecked on Spiekeroog, Kingdom of Hanover. She was on a voyage from Greenock, Renfrewshire to Hamburg.
Brothers	United Kingdom	The ship ran aground on the Haisborough Sands, in the North Sea off the coast of Norfolk. She refloated the next day but consequently foundered with the loss of all but one of her crew. The survivor was rescued by the brig Gipsey (United Kingdom).
Emmerson	United Kingdom	War of 1812: The ship was captured and sunk by the privateer Ranger (United States). She was on a voyage from Newcastle upon Tyne, Northumberland to Jamaica.
Robert	United Kingdom	War of 1812: The ship was captured and sunk by the privateer America (United States) whilst on a voyage from Portsmouth, Hampshire to São Miguel, Azores, Portugal.
Vigilante	Netherlands	The ship was driven ashore near Mandal, Norway. She was on a voyage from Amsterdam, North Holland to Christiansand, Norway.

=== 18 January ===
List of shipwrecks: 18 January 1815
Ship	State	Description
Armen	United Kingdom	The ship was driven ashore on the coast of Lincolnshire. She was on a voyage from Wisbech, Cambridgeshire to Hull, Yorkshire.
Enterprize	United Kingdom	The ship was driven ashore and wrecked at Withernsea, Yorkshire. Her crew were rescued. She was on a voyage from Kirkcaldy, Fife to Rotterdam, South Holland, Netherlands.
Perseverance	(United Kingdom of Great Britain and Ireland) Grenada	War of 1812: The schooner, which had been captured by a privateer on 25 December 1814 off Demerara, was set afire and sunk off Tobago.
HMS Sylph	Royal Navy	The sloop-of-war was wrecked on Long Island, New York, United States, with the loss of 111 of her 117 crew.
Unnamed	United Kingdom	The brig was driven ashore at Aldeburgh, Suffolk. Her crew were rescued. She was on a vohyage from London to Sunderland, County Durham.

=== 19 January ===
List of shipwrecks: 19 January 1815
Ship	State	Description
Chance	United Kingdom	The ship was driven ashore at Hornsea, Yorkshire. Her crew were rescued. She was on a voyage from London to South Shields, County Durham.
Samuel	United Kingdom	The brig was abandoned in the Atlantic Ocean. Her crew were rescued by HMS Wasp (Royal Navy). Samuel was on a voyage from Halifax, Nova Scotia, British North America to Demerara.
William Smith	United Kingdom	The sloop capsized in the English Channel off Maisy, Calvados, France.
Unnamed	United Kingdom	The ship was driven ashore and broke in tow at Atwick, Yorkshire with the loss of all hands.

=== 20 January ===
List of shipwrecks: 20 January 1815
Ship	State	Description
Daughter Alida	France	The ship was beached at Dunkerque, Nord. She was on a voyage from London to Ostend, West Flanders, Netherlands.
Jeannie	United Kingdom	The ship was wrecked on the Corton Sand, in the North Sea off Corton, Suffolk. The Lowestoft Lifeboat rescued her crew. She was on a voyage from Hull, Yorkshire, United Kingdom to London.
William	United Kingdom	War of 1812: The ship was captured in the Atlantic Ocean (42°39′N 16°40′W) by the privateer Reindeer (United States). She was set afire and sunk. William was on a voyage from Whitehaven, Cumberland to São Miguel, Azores, Portugal.

=== 21 January ===
List of shipwrecks: 21 January 1815
Ship	State	Description
Enterprize	United Kingdom	The ship sprang a leak and foundered. She was on a voyage from Kingston, Jamaica to Santa Martha.
Good Hoop	Netherlands	The ship was driven ashore and wrecked at Great Yarmouth, Norfolk, United Kingdom. Her crew were rescued. She was on a voyage from Newcastle upon Tyne, Northumberland, United Kingdom to Rotterdam, South Holland.

=== 22 January ===
List of shipwrecks: 22 January 1815
Ship	State	Description
Lady Sherbrooke	United Kingdom	The ship ran aground at Halifax, Nova Scotia, British North America and was wrecked. She was on a voyage from St. Andrews, Nova Scotia, to Greenock, Renfrewshire.

=== 23 January ===
List of shipwrecks: 23 January 1815
Ship	State	Description
Bennett	United Kingdom	The ship departed from Newfoundland, British North America for Naples. No further trace, presumed foundered with the loss of all hands.
Hector	United Kingdom	The ship was abandoned in the Atlantic Ocean off Cape Finisterre, Spain due to her pumps being choked. Her crew were rescued by a Portuguese ship. She was on a voyage from Waterford to Cádiz, Spain.

=== 24 January ===
List of shipwrecks: 24 January 1815
Ship	State	Description
Maria Johanna	Sweden	The ship was driven ashore in the Loire by ice.
São Joan Baptista	Portugal	The ship was driven ashore in the Loire by ice. She was on a voyage from Nantes, Loire-Inférieure, France to Amsterdam, North Holland, Netherlands.

=== 25 January ===
List of shipwrecks: 25 January 1815
Ship	State	Description
General Wellington	Spain	The brig was driven ashore at Gibraltar.
Iris	United Kingdom	The ship ran aground on the Barber Sand, in the North Sea off the coast of Norfolk.
Lively	United Kingdom	The ship was wrecked on the Goodwin Sands, Kent. Her crew were rescued. She was on a voyage from London to Exeter, Devon.
Lord Nelson	United Kingdom	The sloop was driven ashore at Gibraltar. She was later refloated.
Prince Regent	United Kingdom	The ship was driven ashore at Gibraltar. She was on a voyage from Malta to Havana, Cuba. Prince Regent was later refloated.
Tres Irmanos	Spain	The brig was driven ashore at Gibraltar.

=== 26 January ===
List of shipwrecks: 26 January 1815
Ship	State	Description
City of Aberdeen	United Kingdom	The brig was wrecked on Lindisfarne, Northumberland. Her crew were rescued. She was on a voyage from Sunderland, County Durham to Aberdeen.
Enighton	United Kingdom	The sloop was wrecked in the Sound of Mull. She was on a voyage from Long Island, New York, United States to Liverpool, Lancashire.
Friheton	Sweden	The ship ran aground on the Goodwin Sands, Kent, United Kingdom. She was on a voyage fromn Gothenburg to Havana, Cuba. She was refloated and taken in to Ramsgate, Kent in a leaky condition.
London	United Kingdom	The ship ran aground on the Goodwin Sands. She was on a voyage from London to Plymouth, Devon. She was refloated and taken in to Ramsgate.
Triton	Norway	The ship was driven ashore near Lowestoft, Suffolk, United Kingdom. She was on a voyage from Kragerø to London, United Kingdom. She was refloated and taken in to Lowestoft in a severely leaky condition.
Vriesland	Netherlands	The ship was wrecked on the Galloper Sand. Her crew were rescued. She was on a voyage from Harlingen, Friesland to Cádiz, Spain.
William and Elizabeth	United Kingdom	The ship was driven ashore at Gravesend, Kent. She was on a voyage from London to Newcastle upon Tyne, Northumberland.

=== 27 January ===
List of shipwrecks: 27 January 1815
Ship	State	Description
Argyle	United Kingdom	The ship was driven ashore and severely damaged at "Pordallan". She was on a voyage from Dublin to Plymouth, Devon.
Caledonia	United Kingdom	The ship was wrecked near Aberdeen with the loss of all hands.
Commerce	United Kingdom	The brig was driven ashore at Stockton-on-Tees, County Durham. Her crew were rescued.
Durham Packet	United Kingdom	The ship was driven ashore between Cley-next-the-Sea and Wells-next-the-Sea, Norfolk. All nine people on board were rescued. She was later refloated and taken in to Blakeney, Norfolk.
Elizabeth	United Kingdom	The ship was driven ashore near the mouth of the River Tees. Her crew were rescued.
Fountain	United Kingdom	The ship was driven ashore and wrecked at Sunderland, County Durham with the loss of all hands. She was on a voyage from Shoreham-by-Sea, Sussex to Sunderland.
Gute Hoffnung	Sweden	The ship ran aground at Londonderry, United Kingdom and was severely damaged. She put into Tulmore Bay, where two of her crew were lost abandoning ship.Gute Hoffnung was on a voyage from Gothenburg to Drogheda, County Louth, United Kingdom.
Henrietta	United Kingdom	The sloop sank at Sunderland with the loss of all four crew.
John and Sarah	United Kingdom	The sloop was driven onto rocks in Tor Bay and wrecked.
Lark	United Kingdom	The brig was driven ashore and wrecked between Boulmer and Howickburn, Northumberland, with the loss of six of her seven crew. She was on a voyage from Sunderland to King's Lynn, Norfolk.
Mercury	United Kingdom	The brig was wrecked on the Black Middens, in the North Sea off South Shields, County Durham. The South Shields Lifeboat rescued her crew.
Providence	United Kingdom	The ship was wrecked near Aberdeen with the loss of all but one of her crew. She was on a voyage from Sunderland to Aberdeen.
Queen Charlotte	United Kingdom	The brig was wrecked on the Scilly Rock, in the Isles of Scilly, with the loss of four of the seventeen people on board, and that of two rescuers. She was on a voyage from Greenock, Renfrewshire to Jamaica.
Spring	United Kingdom	The ship was lost off Spurn Point, Yorkshire. Her crew were rescued. She was on a voyage from Sunderland to London.
Success	United Kingdom	The brig ran aground on the Herd Sand, in the North Sea off South Shields, with the loss of three of her crew. She was on a voyage from Arundel, Sussex to South Shields.
Thames	United Kingdom	The smack foundered at Aberdeen with the loss of all on board. She was on a voyage from London to Aberdeen.
Union	United Kingdom	The ship was wrecked in the Firth of Tay. She was on a voyage from London to Perth.
Unity	United Kingdom	The ship was lost near Glenarm, County Antrim. She was on a voyage from Glasgow, Renfrewshire to Londonderry.
Unnamed	United Kingdom	The brig was driven ashore at Newton-by-the-Sea, Northumberland.

=== 28 January ===
List of shipwrecks: 28 January 1815
Ship	State	Description
Alecto	United Kingdom	The ship was driven ashore near Grimsby, Lincolnshire. She was on a voyage from Sunderland, County Durham to London. Alecto was later refloated.
Betsy	United Kingdom	The ship was driven ashore and wrecked at Hartlepool, County Durham. Her nine crew were saved by the Hartlepool lifeboat.
Courier	Flag unknown	The ship ran on to an anchor and sank in the Tagus.
Golden Fleece	United Kingdom	The ship was driven ashore and wrecked at Whitby, Yorkshire. Her crew were rescued. She was on a voyage from Sunderland, County Durham to London.
Mary	United Kingdom	The ship was driven ashore at Beachy Head, Sussex, having sprung a leak and been abandoned by her crew on 18 January.
Mercury	United Kingdom	The ship was lost at the mouth of the River Tyne. She was on a voyage from London to Blyth, Northumberland.
Success	United Kingdom	The ship was wrecked on the Herd Sand, in the North Sea off South Shields, County Durham, with the loss of three of her crew. She was on a voyage from Arundel, Sussex to South Shields.
Whitton	United Kingdom	The transport ship foundered whilst on a voyage from Lisbon, Portugal to Bristol, Gloucestershire, United Kingdom. Alliance (United Kingdom) rescued all aboard.
Unnamed	Denmark	The ship was driven ashore at Berwick upon Tweed, Northumberland, United Kingdom.
Unnamed	United Kingdom	The West Indiaman was wrecked in the Isles of Scilly. There were at least thirteen survivors.

=== 29 January ===
List of shipwrecks: 29 January 1815
Ship	State	Description
Ann	United Kingdom	The ship ran aground on the Cross Sand, in the North Sea and sank. Her crew were rescued. She was on a voyage from Chatham, Kent to Sunderland, County Durham.
Boscastle	United Kingdom	The sloop foundered in the Bristol Channel off Aberthaw, Glamorgan with the loss of all hands. She was on a voyage from Boscastle, Cornwall to Bristol, Gloucestershire, United Kingdom.
Caledonia	United Kingdom	The ship was lost near Aberdeen with the loss of hands.
Frorsoket	Denmark	The ship was wrecked on Skagen. She was on a voyage from Copenhagen to Newcastle upon Tyne, Northumberland, United Kingdom.
John	United Kingdom	The ship was wrecked at São Miguel, Azores, Portugal. She was on a voyage from London to Livorno, Kingdom of Etruria.
Providence	United Kingdom	The ship was lost near Aberdeen with the loss of all bar her captain. She was on a voyage from Sunderland to Aberdeen.
Superb	United Kingdom	The ship was in collision with Hope at Plymouth, Devon and sank. She was on a voyage from London to Liverpool, Lancashire. Hope was severely damaged. She was on a voyage from Plymouth to Bordeaux, Gironde, France.
Thames	United Kingdom	The smack was lost at Aberdeen with the loss of all hands and two passengers. She was on a voyage from London to Aberdeen.

=== 30 January ===
List of shipwrecks: 30 January 1815
Ship	State	Description
Alonzo	Sweden	The ship ran aground on the Goodwin Sands, Kent, United Kingdom and was severely damaged. She was on a voyage from Uddevalla to a Mediterranean port. Alonzo was later refloated and taken in to Ramsgate, Kent.
Anna Amanda Amelia	Sweden	The schooner was driven ashore at Wainfleet, Lincolnshire, United Kingdom. She was on a voyage from Stockholm to a Mediterranean port.
Brothers	United Kingdom	The ship was lost near Mogador, Morocco. She was on a voyage from Mogador to London.
Fame	United Kingdom	The ship was lost near Lydney, Gloucestershire with the loss of all habnds. She was on a voyage from Swansea, Glamorgan to Gloucester.
Weender	Danzig	The galiot was driven ashore and wrecked at Wainsfleet. She was on a voyage from Danzig to London.

=== Unknown date ===
List of shipwrecks: Unknown date in January 1815
Ship	State	Description
Agriculture	United Kingdom	The sloop was driven ashore and wrecked at Holmpton, Yorkshire. Her crew were rescued. The wreck was plundered by the local inhabitants.
Alexander Primo	Malta	The ship was driven ashore and damaged at Malta in late January.
Argo	United Kingdom	The ship was driven ashore in The Wash. She was refloated and taken in to Harwich, Essex, where she arrived on 13 January.
Aurora	United Kingdom	The ship was wrecked on the coast of Jutland with the loss of all but two of her crew. She was on a voyage from Hamburg to London.
Byden	United Kingdom	The ship was wrecked on Saaremaa, Russia. She was on a voyage from Memel, Prussia to Carlshamn, Sweden.
Bryde Roberts	Rostock	The ship struck on Ortsholea. She was on a voyage from Reval, Russia to Rostock. She was refloated and put back to Reval in a severely leaky condition.
Carlotta	Sweden	The ship was wrecked off "Skagar". She was on a voyage from Stockholm to Oporto, Portugal.
Chances	United Kingdom	The ship was driven ashore near Hornsea, Yorkshire.
Christiana Augusto	Portugal	The ship sank at Oporto. Her crew were rescued. She was on a voyage from Bordeaux, Gironde, France to Oporto.
Clara	United Kingdom	The ship was driven ashore on the Holderness coast, Yorkshire. She was refloated on 26 January and taken in to Hull, Yorkshire.
Cornwallis	East India Company	The East Indiaman was wrecked at Trincomalee, Ceylon.
Diligentia	France	The ship ran aground in the Scheldt, She was on a voyage from Antwerp, Netherlands to Lisbon, Portugal.
Don	United Kingdom	The ship was driven ashore near Newton. Her crew were rescued.
Dorothy	United Kingdom	The ship foundered in the North Sea off the Holderness with some loss of life. She was on a voyage from King's Lynn, Norfolk to Gainsborough, Lincolnshire.
Die Verbundenten	Bremen	The ship foundered on a voyage from Bremen to London.
Erstaining	Norway	The ship ran aground on the Long Sand, in the North Sea off the coast of Essex. She was on a voyage from Christiania to St. Martin's. She was refloated, and was taken in to Margate, Kent, United Kingdom on 4 January.
General Picton	United Kingdom	The ship was driven ashore and wrecked on the coast of Jutland. She was on a voyage from Greenock, Renfrewshire to Hamburg.
George	United Kingdom	The ship was driven ashore at Sunderland, County Durham.
Harriet	Norway	The ship was wrecked near Christiansand. She was on a voyage from Bordeaux, Gironde, France to a Norwegian port.
Hercules	Danzig	The ship was lost off Cape Wrath, Sutherland, United Kingdom with the loss of all but one of her crew. She was on a voyage from Danzig to London.
Ischastlieff	Sweden	The ship foundered with the loss of all hands. She was on a voyage from Reval to Stockholm.
Mary Ann	United Kingdom	The ship was driven ashore on "Druridy Sands". Her crew were rescued.
Mary Ann	United Kingdom	The brig was wrecked on Grand Manan Island, New Brunswick, British North America. She was on a voyage from Jamaica to New Brunswick.
Nancy	United Kingdom	The ship was lost off St. Andero, Spain.
Neptunus	Sweden	The ship was wrecked on the Norwegian coast with the loss of all but two of her crew. She was on a voyage from Stockholm to Lisbon.
New Hoffnung	Hamburg	The ship was wrecked at the mouth of the Eider. She was on a voyage from Lisbon to Hamburg.
Oceanus	Denmark	The ship was wrecked at Cherbourg, Manche, France. She was on a voyage from Bordeaux, Gironde, France to Copenhagen.
Perseverance	United Kingdom	The ship ran aground in St. Helen's Pool. She was on a voyage from London to Belfast, County Antrim. She put in to the Isles of Scilly.
Post Boy	United Kingdom	The schooner was driven ashore on the coast of County Donegal. She was on a voyage from Halifax, Nova Scotia, British North America to Greenock.
Ranger	United Kingdom	The ship ran aground at Figueira da Foz, Portugal. She was on a voyage from Newfoundland, British North America to Figuera da Foz.
Tartar	United Kingdom	On 29 January 1815, the ship sailed from Liverpool to Bermuda. A few days later she was totally lost at Castle Maine, Ireland.
Theodore	Netherlands	The ship was wrecked on Ameland, Friesland. She was on a voyage from Bordeaux to Amsterdam, North Holland.
Theodore	United Kingdom	The ship was driven ashore on Bornholm, Denmark. She was on a voyage from Danzig to Liverpool, Lancashire.
Thomas	United Kingdom	The ship was wrecked near Ystad, Sweden. She was on a voyage from Stettin to London.
Thorley	United Kingdom	The ship was driven ashore and wrecked at Formby, Lancashire. She was on a voyage from Narva, Russia to Liverpool, Lancashire.
Tschastlief	Russia	The ship foundered in the Baltic Sea with the loss of all hands. She was on a voyage from Reval to Stockholm, Sweden.
Vrow Anna	Hamburg	The ship was driven ashore at Cuxhaven Kingdom of Hanover at the end of January. She was on a voyage from London to Hamburg.
William	United Kingdom	The ship was driven ashore on "Druridy Sands". Her crew were rescued.
Zephyr	United Kingdom	The ship was run down and sunk in the North Sea off Cromer, Norfolk. She was on a voyage from Hamburg to Hull, Yorkshire and London.
Zephyr	France	The ship was wrecked at "Socoa". She was on a voyage from Dunkerque, Nord to Bayonne, Basses-Pyrénées.
Unnamed	United Kingdom	The ship was wrecked 5 nautical miles (9.3 km) from Gatehouse of Fleet, Wigtownshire before 4 January. Her five crew were rescued. She was on a voyage from Dundee, Forfarshire to Liverpool.
Two unnamed vessels	United Kingdom	War of 1812:The ships were captured by Privateer America (United States) in the Atlantic Ocean and were scuttled.

== February ==
=== 1 February ===
List of shipwrecks: 1 February 1815
Ship	State	Description
Charsten & Peter	Norway	The ship was lost near Aberdeen, United Kingdom. She was on a voyage from North Bergen to Bilbao, Spain.

=== 2 February ===
List of shipwrecks: 2 February 1815
Ship	State	Description
Charlotte	United Kingdom	The transport ship foundered in the Mediterranean Sea off Sardinia on or about 2 February with the loss of all on board, more than 250 people. She was on a voyage from Palermo, Sicily to Gibraltar.

=== 3 February ===
List of shipwrecks: 3 February 1815
Ship	State	Description
Corunna	United Kingdom	War of 1812: The ship was sunk in an action with a privateer off Grenville, Grenada. She was on a voyage from London to Grenada.
Fountain	United Kingdom	The ship was driven ashore and wrecked at Sunderland, County Durham with the loss of all hands.
'Henrietta	Denmark	The ship was driven ashore at Ringkøbing. She was on a voyage from Ramsgate, Kent, United Kingdom to Copenhagen.
Johanna	United Kingdom	War of 1812: The ship was captured in the Atlantic Ocean (38°37′N 10°20′W) by the privateer Macedonian (United States) whilst on a voyage from Fowey, Cornwall to Naples, Kingdom of Sicily. She was set afire and sunk.
John	United Kingdom	War of 1812: The brig was captured off Montserrat by the privateer Ultor (United States) whilst on a voyage from Martinique to Antigua. She was set afire and sunk.
Maria Annabella	United Kingdom	War of 1812: The brig was captured off Montserrat by the privateer Ultor (United States) whilst on a voyage from Dublin to Saint Kitts. She was set afire and sunk.

=== 4 February ===
List of shipwrecks: 4 February 1815
Ship	State	Description
Experiment	United Kingdom	The collier was driven ashore and wrecked at Plymouth, Devon.
Louise Rosalie	United Kingdom	The ship was driven ashore near Saltdean, Sussex. She was on a voyage from Bordeaux, Gironde, France to Hull, Yorkshire.
St. Jean	France	The ship was lost in Mount's Bay with the loss of a crew member. She was on a voyage from Cette, Hérault to Saint-Valery-sur-Somme, Somme.

=== 5 February ===
List of shipwrecks: 5 February 1815
Ship	State	Description
Chasten and Peter	Denmark	The galiot was wrecked at Aberdeen, United Kingdom with the loss of two of her crew. She was on a voyage from Bergen, Norway to Bilbao, Spain.

=== 6 February ===
List of shipwrecks: 6 February 1815
Ship	State	Description
Beatrix	United Kingdom	The ship foundered in the North Sea off Flamborough Head, Yorkshire. Her crew were rescued. She was on a voyage from South Shields, County Durham to London. She was later refloated and taken in to Scarborough, Yorkshire.
Triumvirate	United Kingdom	War of 1812: The ship was captured and sunk by the privateer Macedonia (United States).

=== 7 February ===
List of shipwrecks: 7 February 1815
Ship	State	Description
Lord Duncan	United Kingdom	War of 1812: The ship was captured by the privateer Morgiana (United States) whilst on a voyage from Liverpool, Lancashire to Bermuda. She was set afire and sunk.

=== 9 February ===
List of shipwrecks: 9 February 1815
Ship	State	Description
Martin	United Kingdom	War of 1812: The ship was captured by the privateer Chasseur (United States) whilst on a voyage from Jamaica to Aruba. She was set afire and sunk.

=== 10 February ===
List of shipwrecks: 10 February 1815
Ship	State	Description
Bombay	United Kingdom	The ship ran aground in the Strait of Sunda. She was refloated and taken in to Bombay, India for repairs.
Clarendon	United Kingdom	The transport ship ran ashore at Bermuda. She was refloated.
Francille	France	The ship was wrecked near A Coruña, Spain with the loss of eight lives.
Hector de Groot	Netherlands	The East Indiaman was sighted in the Strait of Sunda. No further trace, presumed foundered with the loss of all hands. She was on a voyage from Batavia, Netherlands East Indies to London, United Kingdom.

=== 11 February ===
List of shipwrecks: 11 February 1815
Ship	State	Description
Economy	United Kingdom	The ship was driven ashore at Mundesley, Norfolk. She was on a voyage from South Shields, County Durham to London.
Elizabeth	United Kingdom	The ship was wrecked at Poole, Dorset. Her crew were rescued. She was on a voyage from London to Poole.
Fortitude	United Kingdom	The ship was driven ashore on Rhum, Inner Hebrides. Her crew were rescued. She was on a voyage from Greenock, Renfrewshire to Hamburg.

=== 13 February ===
List of shipwrecks: 13 February 1815
Ship	State	Description
Starling	United Kingdom	The East Indiaman was driven ashore and wrecked at Birling Gap, Sussex. Her crew were rescued. She was on a voyage from Batavia, Netherlands East Indies to London.
Ocean	United Kingdom	The ship ran aground on The Smalls and sank with the loss of a crew member. Survivors were rescued by General Brock (United Kingdom).
William	United Kingdom	The ship was driven ashore and wrecked at the mouth of the Gironde. She was on a voyage from Newfoundland, British North America to Figueira, Portugal.

=== 14 February ===
List of shipwrecks: 14 February 1815
Ship	State	Description
Charlotte	United Kingdom	The sloop was driven ashore and wrecked at A Coruña, Spain.
Economy	United Kingdom	The ship was driven ashore at Mundesley, Norfolk. She was on a voyage from South Shields, County Durham to London.

=== 15 February ===
List of shipwrecks: 15 February 1815
Ship	State	Description
Lord Nelson	United Kingdom	War of 1812: The ship was captured in the Atlantic Ocean off Madeira, Portugal by USS Constitution (United States Navy). She was set afire and sunk.
Vrede	France	The ship was wrecked on the Goodwin Sands, Kent, United Kingdom. Her crew were rescued. She was on a voyage from Ostend, West Flanders, Netherlands to Nantes, Loire-Inférieure.

=== 17 February ===
List of shipwrecks: 17 February 1815
Ship	State	Description
North Star	United Kingdom	The ship ran aground on Scroby Sands, Norfolk. She was on a voyage from Newcastle upon Tyne, Northumberland to London.

=== 19 February ===
List of shipwrecks: 19 February 1815
Ship	State	Description
Fortune	United Kingdom	The ship ran aground near Milford Haven, Pembrokeshire and was severely damaged. She was on a voyage from Liverpool, Lancashire to Bristol, Gloucestershire.
Stag	United Kingdom	The ship was lost off Lanzarote, Canary Islands. She was on a voyage from Lanzarote to London.

=== 20 February ===
List of shipwrecks: 20 February 1815
Ship	State	Description
Ann	United Kingdom	The ship foundered at The Nore. Her crew were rescued. She was on a voyage from South Shields, County Durham to London.
Hythe	United Kingdom	The transport ship was lost at Senegal. She was on a voyage from London to Senegal.
Lady Troubridge	United Kingdom	War of 1812: The ship was captured and burnt off Barbados by the privateer John (United States).
Prince Oscar	Sweden	The ship was wrecked on Terschelling, Friesland, Netherlands. She was on a voyage from Stockholm to Brazil.
Susannah	United Kingdom	The ship was driven ashore at Penzance, Cornwall. She was on a voyage from Fowey, Cornwall to Neath, Glamorgan. She was refloated.
Vrouw Wilhelmina	France	The ship was driven ashore and wrecked at Monster, South Holland, Netherlands. She was on a voyage from Antwerp, Netherlands to London.

=== 21 February ===
List of shipwrecks: 21 February 1815
Ship	State	Description
Enterprize	United Kingdom	The ship sprang a leak and foundered whilst on a voyage from Kingston, Jamaica to Santa Marta, Viceroyalty of New Grenada.
Susannah	United Kingdom	The schooner was driven ashore and wrecked at Peel, Isle of Man. All 25 people on board survived. She was on a voyage from Whitehaven, Cumberland to Liverpool, Lancashire.

=== 22 February ===
List of shipwrecks: 22 February 1815
Ship	State	Description
Susannah	United Kingdom	The ship was wrecked near the Pile of Foudry. All on board were rescued. She was on a voyage from Whitehaven, Cumberland to Liverpool, Lancashire.

=== 24 February ===
List of shipwrecks: 24 February 1815
Ship	State	Description
Active Jane	United Kingdom	War of 1812: The ship was captured and burnt by the privateer Grand Turk (United States). She was on a voyage from Rio de Janeiro to Maranhão, Brazil.
Louisa	(United Kingdom of Great Britain and Ireland) British North America	The schooner was wrecked near Liverpool, Nova Scotia. Her crew were rescued. She was on a voyage from Jamaica to Saint John, New Brunswick.

=== 25 February ===
List of shipwrecks: 25 February 1815
Ship	State	Description
Diana	United Kingdom	The ship was lost near Ramsey, Isle of Man. She was on a voyage from Dublin to Liverpool, Lancashire.

=== 26 February ===
List of shipwrecks: 26 February 1815
Ship	State	Description
HMS Statira	Royal Navy	The Lively-class frigate struck a rock and foundered off Little Inagua, Bahamas. Her crew were rescued.

=== 27 February ===
List of shipwrecks: 27 February 1815
Ship	State	Description
HMS Statira	Royal Navy	The Lively-class frigate was wrecked on Heneaga, Bahamas. Her crew were rescued.
Wilhelmina	Netherlands	The ship was driven ashore at Gibraltar. She was on a voyage from Cette, Hérault, France to Rotterdam, South Holland.

=== 28 February ===
List of shipwrecks: 28 February 1815
Ship	State	Description
Ino	United States	War of 1812: The privateer was driven ashore at Charleston, South Carolina, by HMS Severn (Royal Navy), which destroyed her.

=== Unknown date ===
List of shipwrecks: Unknown date in February 1815
Ship	State	Description
Alfred	Portugal	The ship was wrecked near Oporto. She was on a voyage from Nantes, Loire-Inférieure, France to Lisbon.
Andromeda	United Kingdom	The transport ship foundered in the Mediterranean Sea with the loss of all on board.
Annehetta	United Kingdom	The ship was wrecked in the Sound of Mull. She was on a voyage from the Isle of Lewis to Liverpool, Lancashire.
Anonyme	France	The ship was wrecked on the Île de Ré, Charente-Inférieure.
Charles	Norway	The ship was driven ashore. She was on a voyage from Bergen to Trieste. She was refloated but drove ashore again. She was refloated and put in to Kristiansand.
Charlotte	United Kingdom	The transport ship foundered off Sardinia. She was on a voyage from Palermo, Kingdom of Sicily to Gibraltar.
Countess of Harcourt	United Kingdom	The ship was abandoned in late February. She was on a voyage from St. Mary's to Bermuda.
Diamond	United Kingdom	The ship was driven ashore and wrecked on the coast of Jutland. She was on a voyage from Glasgow, Renfrewshire to Hamburg.
Enfant Gheri	France	The ship was lost near "Choisie" whilst bound for Nantes, Loire-Inférieure.
Fairy	(United Kingdom of Great Britain and Ireland) British North America	The ship foundered in the Atlantic Ocean 60 nautical miles (110 km) west of Cape Clear Island, County Cork. Her crew were rescued.
Favourite	United Kingdom	War of 1812: The ship was wrecked in the New Inlet, North Carolina, in mid-February. She had been captured by the privateer Warrior (United States) on 27 January whilst on a voyage from Newfoundland, British North America to Alicante, Spain.
Hedwig Fortuna	Sweden	The ship was wrecked at Dagerort. She was on a voyage from Libava, Courland Governorate to Karlshamn.
Henrietta	(France)	The ship was lost near Copenhagen, Denmark, with the loss of all hands. She was on a voyage from Libava to Amsterdam, North Holland, Netherlands.
Hirondelle	France	The ship was lost on the Bec du Raz.
Lord Hood	United Kingdom	War of 1812: The ship was driven ashore at Bilbao, Spain, early in February, crewless and with her masts cut away. She had been captured in September 1814 by the privateer Scourge (United States) whilst on a voyage from Saint John, New Brunswick, British North America to Liverpool.
Margaret	United Kingdom	The ship was wrecked on Syros, Greece. She was on a voyage from Smyrna, Ottoman Empire to London.
Mary Ann	United Kingdom	The brig ran aground in the Orinoco River and was severely damaged. She was on a voyage from Grenada to the Orinoco River.
Renovation	United Kingdom	The transport ship foundered in the Mediterranean Sea with the loss of all on board.
Royal Edward	United Kingdom	The ship was driven ashore near Wexford. She was on a voyage from London to Bermuda. She was refloated and put in to Liverpool, where she arrived on 25 February.
Tartar	United Kingdom	The ship was lost at Castlemaine, County Kerry. She was on a voyage from Liverpool to Jamaica.
Tres Amigos	Spain	The ship was lost near "Castros"; she was on a voyage from London to Bilbao.
Unnamed	United Kingdom	War of 1812: The vessel was captured by Privateer America (United States) in the Atlantic Ocean and was scuttled in the first two weeks of February.
Unnamed	Flag unknown	The brig was driven ashore on Saaremaa, Russia.

== March ==
=== 1 March ===
List of shipwrecks: 1 March 1815
Ship	State	Description
Kingsmill	United Kingdom	The ship ran aground at Bengal. She was refloated and put back to Bengal.

=== 2 March ===
List of shipwrecks: 2 March 1815
Ship	State	Description
HMS Aigle	Royal Navy	The Aigle-class frigate ran aground at Bermuda. She was on a voyage from Havana, Cuba to Cádiz, Spain. She was refloated and resumed her voyage.

=== 3 March ===
List of shipwrecks: 3 March 1815
Ship	State	Description
Vine	United Kingdom	The ship was wrecked near Ravenglass, Cumberland.

=== 5 March ===
List of shipwrecks: 5 March 1815
Ship	State	Description
Fair Cambrian	United Kingdom	The ship was driven ashore on Scattery Island, County Clare. She was on a voyage from London to Limerick. Fair Cambrian was refloated and taken into Limerick on 7 March.
Vine	United Kingdom	The ship was driven ashore and wrecked near Wexford. She was on a voyage from Great Yarmouth, Norfolk to Liverpool, Lancashire.

=== 6 March ===
List of shipwrecks: 6 March 1815
Ship	State	Description
Sophia	United Kingdom	The ketch was run down and sunk off Plymouth, Devon. She was on a voyage from Plymouth to Bordeaux, Gironde, France.

=== 7 March ===
List of shipwrecks: 7 March 1815
Ship	State	Description
Anna Sophia	Sweden	The ship was driven ashore near Galway, United Kingdom. She was on a voyage from Limerick, United Kingdom to Cádiz, Spain.
Lady of the Lake	United Kingdom	War of 1812: The ship was captured by the privateer Young Wasp (United States). She was subsequently recaptured but was lost off Bermuda. Lady of the Lake was on a voyage from Halifax, Nova Scotia, British North America to the West Indies.
L'Auguste	France	The brig was lost near Plymouth, Devon, United Kingdom, with the loss of all hands.
Santa Anna	(United Kingdom of Great Britain and Ireland) Bermuda	The ship foundered in the Atlantic Ocean off Amelia Island, East Florida. New Spain.
Sir Charles Cotton	United Kingdom	The ship was driven ashore and wrecked on Texel, North Holland, Netherlands.

=== 8 March ===
List of shipwrecks: 8 March 1815
Ship	State	Description
Betsey	United Kingdom	The ship departed from Cork for Lisbon, Portugal. No further trace, presumed foundered with the loss of all hands.
Betsey	United Kingdom	The ship was wrecked at Abbotsbury, Dorset. She was on a voyage from Ferrol, Spain to Poole, Dorset.
Flora	Netherlands	The ship was wrecked at Hook of Holland, South Holland with the loss of a crew member. She was on a voyage from Rio de Janeiro, Brazil to Rotterdam, South Holland.

=== 9 March ===
List of shipwrecks: 9 March 1815
Ship	State	Description
Harlequin	France	The ship was driven ashore at Calais. She was on a voyage from Antwerp, Netherlands to Havre de Grâce, Seine-Inférieure.
Illierienne	France	The ship ran aground in the Seine near Havre de Grâce.

=== 10 March ===
List of shipwrecks: 10 March 1815
Ship	State	Description
HMS Cygnet	Royal Navy	The Merlin-class ship-sloop was driven ashore and wrecked at Berbice.
Henrietta	United Kingdom	The ship ran aground. She was on a voyage from London to Madeira and Berbice.

=== 11 March ===
List of shipwrecks: 11 March 1815
Ship	State	Description
Queen Charlotte	United Kingdom	The transport ship ran aground at The Needles, Isle of Wight. All on board were rescued.
Vrouw Annejena	Netherlands	The ship was driven ashore on Vlieland, Friesland. She was on a voyage from Harlingen, Friesland to London, United Kingdom.

=== 12 March ===
List of shipwrecks: 12 March 1815
Ship	State	Description
Latona	United Kingdom	The ship was wrecked on the Sunk Sand, in the North Sea off the coast of Essex. Her crew were rescued. She was on a voyage from Antwerp, Netherlands, France to London.
Rocket	United Kingdom	The ship sank near Wells-next-the-Sea, Norfolk. She was on a voyage from Newcastle upon Tyne, Northumberland to Rouen, Seine-Inférieure, France.
Jubilee	United Kingdom	The ship ran aground in Carlingford Bay and was damaged. She was on a voyage from Alicante, Spain to Newry, County Down. Jubilee was later refloated and taken into Newry.

=== 13 March ===
List of shipwrecks: 13 March 1815
Ship	State	Description
Ashburton	United Kingdom	The ship was lost near Boulogne, Pas-de-Calais, France. She was on a voyage from Lisbon, Portugal to London.
Sea Nymph	United Kingdom	The ship was driven ashore and wrecked on St. Mary's, Isles of Scilly. She was on a voyage from Portsmouth, Hampshire to Madeira, Portugal.
Unnamed'	United Kingdom	The cutter lost near Cherbourgh, Seine-Inférieure, France.

=== 14 March ===
List of shipwrecks: 14 March 1815
Ship	State	Description
Orient	Spain	The ship was driven ashore near the mouth of the Somme. She was on a voyage from Málaga to Havre de Grâce, Seine-Inférieure, France.
Utile	France	The ship was driven ashore and wrecked on the French coast. She was on a voyage from Guadeloupe to Bordeaux, Gironde.
Vrouw Annejune	Netherlands	The ship was driven ashore and wrecked on Vlieland, Friesland. She was on a voyage from Harlingen, Friesland to London, United Kingdom.
William	United Kingdom	The ship ran aground on the Dutchman's Bank, in the Irish Sea off the coast of Anglesey, and sank. Her crew were rescued. She was on a voyage from Wexford to Liverpool, Lancashire.

=== 15 March ===
List of shipwrecks: 15 March 1815
Ship	State	Description
Betsey	United Kingdom	The ship foundered in the Atlantic Ocean off Padstow, Cornwall with the loss of all but her captain.
Esperanza	Portugal	The ship foundered in the Bay of Biscay off Paimbœuf, Loire-Inférieure, France. She was on a voyage from Nantes, Loire-Inférieure to Lisbon, Portugal.
Flora	Portugal	The ship was driven ashore at Hook of Holland, South Holland, Netherlands with the loss of a crew member. She was on a voyage from Rio de Janeiro to Rotterdam, South Holland.
Mary	United Kingdom	The ship was driven ashore and wrecked at Folkestone, Kent. She was on a voyage from Leith, Lothian to Oporto, Portugal.
Pulchera	France	The ship was driven ashore at Quillebeuf-sur-Seine, Eure.

=== 16 March ===
List of shipwrecks: 16 March 1815
Ship	State	Description
Vrouw Margaretta	Bremen	The ship sprang a leak and was abandoned in the North Sea. She was on a voyage from the Weser to Hull, Yorkshire, United Kingdom.

=== 17 March ===
List of shipwrecks: 17 March 1815
Ship	State	Description
Ranger	United Kingdom	The ship was lost at Halifax, Nova Scotia, British North America.
Vier Gesusters	Netherlands	The ship was wrecked on Texel, North Holland. Her crew were rescued. She was on a voyage from London, United Kingdom to Amsterdam, North Holland.

=== 18 March ===
List of shipwrecks: 18 March 1815
Ship	State	Description
Iris	United Kingdom	The ship was driven ashore and wrecked at "Aberg", Jutland. She was on a voyage from London to Stettin.
Triore	Hamburg	The ship was driven ashore at "Hotbeet". She was on a voyage from Hamburg to Hull, Yorkshire, United Kingdom. Triore was later refloated.
Vrundschap	Netherlands	The ship was driven ashore and wrecked east of Boulogne-sur-Mer, Pas-de-Calais, France. She was on a voyage from a Dutch port to Havre de Grâce, Seine-Inférieure, France.

=== 19 March ===
List of shipwrecks: 19 March 1815
Ship	State	Description
Sidney	United Kingdom	The ship foundered with the loss of all hands whilst on a voyage from Newfoundland, British North America to A Coruña, Spain.

=== 20 March ===
List of shipwrecks: 20 March 1815
Ship	State	Description
Antelope	United Kingdom	The ship was lost in the Greek Islands whilst bound for Constantinople, Ottoman Empire.
Dublin	United Kingdom	The ship was driven ashore at Liverpool, Lancashire. She was on a voyage from Liverpool to Cork and Jamaica.
Maria	United Kingdom	The ship foundered in the North Sea off Domesnes, Norway. Her crew were rescued. She was on a voyage from Sunderland, County Durham to Gothenburg, Sweden.
Matilda	United Kingdom	The ship ran aground near Pillau, Prussia and was wrecked. She was on a voyage from King's Lynn, Norfolk to Pillau.
HMS Scylla	Royal Navy	The Cruizer-class brig-sloop was driven ashore at Liverpool. She was on a voyage from Liverpool to Cork. HMS Scylla was later refloated and taken into Liverpool.

=== 21 March ===
List of shipwrecks: 21 March 1815
Ship	State	Description
Harriet Charlotte	United Kingdom	The ship capsized and sank off Blakeney, Norfolk. She was on a voyage from London to Hull, Yorkshire.
Lord Wellington	United Kingdom	The ship struck rocks off Milford Haven, Pembrokeshire and was severely damaged. She was on a voyage from Newcastle, County Down to London.

=== 23 March ===
List of shipwrecks: 23 March 1815
Ship	State	Description
Antelope	United Kingdom	The ship foundered in the Aegean Sea.
Harriett and Charlotte	United Kingdom	The ship capsized and sank off Cromer, Norfolk with the loss of all but one of her crew.
Jonge Jan	Kingdom of Hanover	The ship was driven ashore and wrecked on Terschelling, Friesland, Netherlands. She was on a voyage from Emden to London, United Kingdom.

=== 24 March ===
List of shipwrecks: 24 March 1815
Ship	State	Description
Mary	United Kingdom	The ship was lost in Ramsey Bay. She was on a voyage from Liverpool, Lancashire to Kirkcudbright, Wigtownshire.
Wolfe's Cove	United Kingdom	The ship grounded in the River Thames and fell on her side. She was on a voyage to Halifax, Nova Scotia, and Saint John, New Brunswick. She was refloated, and after a survey determined that she had suffered no damage, she resumed her voyage.

=== 25 March ===
List of shipwrecks: 25 March 1815
Ship	State	Description
Garland	United Kingdom	The ship ran aground on the Newcombe Sand, in the North Sea off the coast of Norfolk. She was on a voyage from Newcastle upon Tyne, Northumberland to London. She was refloated and taken in to Great Yarmouth, Norfolk.
Young George	Hamburg	The ship was wrecked on the coast of Friesland, Netherlands. She was on a voyage from Hamburg to Tenerife, Spain.

=== 26 March ===
List of shipwrecks: 27 March 1815
Ship	State	Description
Alexander	United Kingdom	The ship was wrecked 2 nautical miles (3.7 km) west of Portland, Dorset with much loss of life. There were five survivors. She was on a voyage from Bombay, India to London.
HMS Penguin	Royal Navy	War of 1812:The Brig was defeated and captured by USS Hornet (United States Navy) off Tristan da Cunha in the Atlantic Ocean on the 23rd, and was scuttled on the 26th. 15 KIA and 28 WIA.

=== 27 March ===
List of shipwrecks: 27 March 1815
Ship	State	Description
Alexander	United Kingdom	The East Indiaman was driven ashore and wrecked at Wyke, Dorset with the loss of at least 130 lives. There were five survivors. She was on a voyage from Bombay, India to London.
Betsey	United Kingdom	The sloop was driven ashore and wrecked at Maryport, Cumberland. She was on a voyage from Cork to Liverpool, Lancashire.
Cunningham Boyle	United Kingdom	The ship was driven ashore at Bootle, Lancashire. She refloated but consequently sank. Cunningham Boyle was on a voyage from Belfast, County Antrim to Liverpool. She was refloated on 17 March and taken in to Liverpool.
Harrison	United Kingdom	The transport ship was driven ashore and wrecked on Anglesey.
Hope	United Kingdom	The ship was wrecked near Campbeltown, Wigtownshire. She was on a voyage from St. John's, Newfoundland, British North America to Greenock, Renfrewshire.
Java	United Kingdom	The ship was driven ashore at the South Foreland, Kent. She was refloated and taken in to The Downs.

=== 28 March ===
List of shipwrecks: 28 March 1815
Ship	State	Description
Aurora	United Kingdom	The ship was driven ashore and wrecked at Norlect, Jutland. She was on a voyage from London to Christiana, Norway.

=== 29 March ===
List of shipwrecks: 29 March 1815
Ship	State	Description
Adventure	United Kingdom	The ship sprang a leak and foundered in the Atlantic Ocean whilst on a voyage from Jamaica to Liverpool, Lancashire. Bowes (United Kingdom) rescued Adventure's crew.
John	United Kingdom	The ship was lost off Cantick Head, Orkney Islands with the loss of a crew member. She was on a voyage from North Shields, County Durham to Miramichi, New Brunswick, British North America.

=== Unknown date ===
List of shipwrecks: Unknown date in March 1815
Ship	State	Description
Ann	United Kingdom	The ship sprang a leak and was abandoned by her crew, who were rescued by Pilot (United Kingdom). Ann was on a voyage from Saint Lucia to London.
Antonio	Spain	The ship was lost on Sullivan's Island, South Carolina, United States before 9 March.
Eliza	United Kingdom	The ship was wrecked at "Rugginfleet" before 30 March. Her crew were rescued. She was on a voyage from London to Hamburg. Eliza was subsequently raised and beached in shallower waters.
HMS Elizabeth	Royal Navy	The schooner capsized in the West Indies with the loss of all hands.
Elizabeth	United Kingdom	The ship was wrecked on the Little Hope Island at the end of March. She was on a voyage from Liverpool, Lancashire to Bermuda and thence to Halifax, Nova Scotia, British North America.
Felicita	Malta	The ship foundered in the Mediterranean Sea whilst on a voyage from Malta to Constantinople, Ottoman Empire.
Harriet	United Kingdom	The ship foundered in the Bay of Biscay. Her crew were rescued by HMS Ethalion (Royal Navy). She was on a voyage from Liverpool to Marseille, Bouches-du-Rhône, France.
Henrietta	United Kingdom	The ship was driven ashore near Berbice. She was on a voyage from London to Madeira. Henrietta was refloated and taken in to Demerara, where she arrived on 17 April.
John & Ann	United Kingdom	War of 1812: The ship was captured on 10 March by the privateer Young Wasp (United States) whilst on a voyage from Halifax to the West Indies. She was subsequently wrecked at Oracoke, North Carolina, United States.
Mariner	United Kingdom	The ship was wrecked on an island west of Saint Thomas, Virgin Islands. She was on a voyage from Barbados to Saint John, New Brunswick, British North America.
Martha	United Kingdom	The ship foundered in the Bay of Biscay. Her crew were rescued by HMS Ethalion (Royal Navy). She was on a voyage from Liverpool to Cádiz, Spain.
Martiniquais	France	The ship was driven ashore and wrecked at La Rochelle, Charente-Inférieure.
Mercure	France	The ship was wrecked near Cartagena, Spain. She was on a voyage from Marseillesto Amsterdam, North Holland, Netherlands.
Nostra Senhora de Aguia	Portugal	The ship was driven ashore near Le Conquet, Finistère, France. She was on a voyage from Oporto to London.
Pam-be-Civil	United Kingdom	The ship was driven ashore at Shelburne, Nova Scotia, at the end of March. She was on a voyage from Demerara to Halifax.
Robert	United Kingdom	The ship was lost on the Norwegian coast. Her crew were rescued.
Theresa	(France) French Empire	The ship was wrecked on the Île d'Oléron, Charente-Inférieure. She was on a voyage from Antwerp, Netherlands to Bordeaux, Gironde.
Union	France	The ship was wrecked on the Île d'Oléron. She was on a voyage from Cádiz to Bordeaux.

== April ==
=== 1 April ===
List of shipwrecks: 1 April 1815
Ship	State	Description
Lady Collingwood	United Kingdom	The transport ship foundered in Passamaquoddy Bay. All on board were rescued. She was on a voyage from Castine, Maine, United States to Saint John, New Brunswick, British North America.
Speedwell	United Kingdom	The ship foundered in the Grand Banks of Newfoundland. Her crew were rescued by Orient (United Kingdom)Nova Scotia to Newfoundland, British North America.

=== 2 April ===
List of shipwrecks: 2 April 1815
Ship	State	Description
Lady Ranelagh	United Kingdom	The ship foundered in the Irish Sea whilst on a voyage from Liverpool, Lancashire to Newry, County Down. Her crew survived.

=== 3 April ===
List of shipwrecks: 3 April 1815
Ship	State	Description
Surprise	United States	The privateer ran aground in a storm at Manasquan Inlet on the coast of New Jersey. Fifteen of her crew drowned.

=== 4 April ===
List of shipwrecks: 4 April 1815
Ship	State	Description
Clio	United Kingdom	The ship was driven ashore at Pillau, Prussia. She was on a voyage from Sunderland, County Durham to Pillau. She was later refloated and taken in to Pillau.
Olive Branch	United Kingdom	The ship was destroyed by fire near Deptford, Kent. She was on a voyage from London to Saint John, New Brunswick, British North America.

=== 5 April ===
List of shipwrecks: 5 April 1815
Ship	State	Description
Amelia	Stettin	The ship ran aground at Great Yarmouth, Norfolk, United Kingdom. She was on a voyage from Stettin to Bordeaux, Gironde, France.
Goede Hoop	Stettin	The ship was wrecked near Katwijk, North Holland, Netherlands. Her crew were rescued. She was on a voyage from Stettin to Bordeaux.

=== 7 April ===
List of shipwrecks: 7 April 1815
Ship	State	Description
British Volunteer	United Kingdom	The ship ran aground at Pillau, Prussia with the loss of a crew member. She was on a voyage from Newcastle upon Tyne, Northumberland to Pillau.
Clarendon	United Kingdom	The transport ship was driven ashore and wrecked on Sandy Hook, New Jersey, United States. All on board were rescued. She was on a voyage from Bermuda to New York, United States.
Stirling	United Kingdom	The ship was driven ashore near Memel, Prussia.

=== 8 April ===
List of shipwrecks: 8 April 1815
Ship	State	Description
Catherine Maria	Hamburg	The ship was driven ashore at Dunkerque, Nord, France. She was on a voyage from Hamburg to Liverpool, Lancashire, United Kingdom. She was refloated and taken in to Dunkerque
Portland	United Kingdom	The ship was driven ashore and damaged near Peterhead, Aberdeenshire. She was on a voyage from North Shields to a port in North America.
Treys Reys	Portugal	The ship was lost in the Bay of Da Cruiz. Her crew were rescued. She was on a voyage from Oporto to Pará, Brazil.

=== 9 April ===
List of shipwrecks: 9 April 1815
Ship	State	Description
Edward	(United Kingdom of Great Britain and Ireland) Saint Kitts	The ship foundered whilst on a voyage from Boston, Massachusetts, United States to Saint Kitts with the loss of three of her crew. Survivors were rescued by Lucille (France).
Vrow Elizabeth	Netherlands	The ship was driven ashore at Saltfleet, Lincolnshire, United Kingdom. She was on a voyage from Dort, South Holland to Sunderland, County Durham, United Kingdom.

=== 10 April ===
List of shipwrecks: 10 April 1815
Ship	State	Description
Catharine	United Kingdom	The ship was driven ashore and wrecked near Memel, Prussia.
Three Friends	United Kingdom	The ship ran aground on the Corton Sand, in the North Sea off the coast of Suffolk. She was on a voyage from Rotterdam, South Holland, Netherlands to London. She was refloated and put in to Great Yarmouth, Norfolk.
Three Sisters	United Kingdom	The ship was wrecked in the Gulf of St. Lawrence with the loss of all but two of her crew.

=== 11 April ===
List of shipwrecks: 11 April 1815
Ship	State	Description
Nantwich	United Kingdom	The ship struck The Smalls and consequently foundered off Grassholm. Her crew survived. She was on a voyage from Chester, Cheshire to London.

=== 12 April ===
List of shipwrecks: 12 April 1815
Ship	State	Description
Newry	United Kingdom	The ship departed from Dartmouth, Devon for Liverpool, Lancashire. No further trace, presumed foundered with the loss of all hands.
Perthshire	United Kingdom	The ship ran aground in Ballycronan Bay and was wrecked. She was on a voyage from Jamaica to Greenock, Renfrewshire.

=== 14 April ===
List of shipwrecks: 14 April 1815
Ship	State	Description
Alexander and Mary	United Kingdom	The ship was driven ashore 5 nautical miles (9.3 km) from Donaghadee, County Antrim. She was on a voyage from Liverpool, Lancashire to Belfast, County Antrim. She was wrecked on 15 April.
Annabella	United Kingdom	The ship foundered in the North Sea off Barmston, Yorkshire. Her crew were rescued by a Danish vessel. She was on a voyage from Sunderland, County Durham to Arbroath, Forfarshire.
Ann Dalrymple	United Kingdom	The sloop sprang a leak and was run ashore near Seaton, County Durham. She was on a voyage from Leith, Lothian to London.
Archduke	United Kingdom	The sloop was driven ashore near Sunderland.
Britannia	United Kingdom	The ship was driven ashore and wrecked at Padstow, Cornwall. She was on a voyage from Cardigan to Padstow.
Brother and Sister	United Kingdom	The ship was driven ashore at Grimsby, Lincolnshire.
Brothers	United Kingdom	The fishing boat was lost off Whitby, Yorkshire with the loss of all hands.
Caroline	United Kingdom	The ship foundered in the North Sea off Wells-next-the-Sea, Norfolk with the loss of all hands. She was on a voyage from Newcastle upon Tyne, Northumberland to Cley-next-the-Sea, Norfolk.
Charles	United Kingdom	The transport ship was driven ashore and wrecked at Ostend, West Flanders, Netherlands. Her crew were rescued.
Charlotte	United Kingdom	The ship was driven ashore and wrecked at Dimlington, Yorkshire. Her crew were rescued. She was on a voyage from Sunderland to Boston, Lincolnshire.
Constantine	United Kingdom	The ship foundered in the North Sea off Hartlepool, County Durham. Her crew were rescued.
Curlew	United Kingdom	The ship was lost near Whitby with the loss of all hands.
Eclipse	United Kingdom	The schooner was driven ashore at Seaton. She was on a voyage from Sunderland to a Scottish port.
Edinburgh Packet	United Kingdom	The ship was driven ashore near Sunderland.
Eleanor	United Kingdom	The ship was lost on this date.
Fleece	United Kingdom	The ship was driven ashore at Grimsby.
George and Mary	United Kingdom	The ship was driven ashore between Brancaster and Wells-next-the-Sea, Norfolk.
Harvest Home	United Kingdom	The ship was driven ashore at Brancaster and wrecked. She was on a voyage from King's Lynn to Hull, Yorkshire.
Hind	United Kingdom	The ship was wrecked on the Goodwin Sands, Kent. Her crew survived. She was on a voyage from Surinam to London.
Hope	United Kingdom	The brig was wrecked on the Haisborough Sands, Norfolk with the loss of all hands.
Industry	United Kingdom	The ship was driven ashore and wrecked at Grimsby. She was on a voyage from Hull to Boston.
James and Joseph	United Kingdom	The ship was driven ashore at Cley-next-the-Sea, Norfolk.
Jason	United Kingdom	The ship ran aground on the Hearne Sand, in the Boston Deeps.
Kitty	United Kingdom	The brig was driven ashore and wrecked on the Norfolk coast.
Nancy	United Kingdom	The fishing smack foundered in the North Sea with the loss of all hands.
Neptune	United Kingdom	The ship was driven ashore and wrecked at St. Ives, Cornwall. Her crew were rescued.
Neptune	United Kingdom	The ship was driven ashore at Cromer, Norfolk. Her crew were rescued.
Neptune	United Kingdom	The ship was driven ashore at Weybourne, Norfolk.
Peterhead	United Kingdom	The sloop was driven ashore at Sunderland. Her crew were rescued.
Plymouth	United Kingdom	The ship was lost near Whitby with the loss of all hands.
Richard and Sarah	United Kingdom	The lugger capsized in the North Sea off Scarborough, Yorkshire with the loss of all nine of her crew.
St. Andrew	United Kingdom	The ship was driven ashore at Sunderland. She was refloated.
Success	United Kingdom	The sloop foundered in the North Sea off the mouth of the River Tees with the loss of all hands.
Thomas	United Kingdom	The ship capsized in the North Sea off Whitby with the loss of all hands. The wreck later came ashore.
Three Sisters	United Kingdom	The ship was driven ashore at Grimsby.
Two Sisters	United Kingdom	The fishing smack was wrecked off Texel, North Holland, Netherlands.
Vrouw Elizabeth	Netherlands	The ship was driven ashore and wrecked at Wainfleet, Lincolnshire. She was on a voyage from Dordrecht, South Holland to Stockton-on-Tees, County Durham.
William	United Kingdom	The fishing smack foundered in the North Sea with the loss of all hands.
Unnamed	United Kingdom	The Humber Keel was driven ashore and wrecked at Wainfleet.
Unnamed	United Kingdom	The ship was destroyed by fire when her cargo of lime got wet.

=== 15 April ===
List of shipwrecks: 15 April 1815
Ship	State	Description
Brough	{{{flag}}}	The horse boat was driven ashore at Ferriby Sluice, Lincolnshire. Her crew were rescued.
Gainsboro'	United Kingdom	The ship departed from The Downs for Sierra Leone. No further trace, presumed foundered with the loss of all hands.
Providence	United Kingdom	The brig was driven ashore and wrecked at Winterton-on-Sea, Norfolk with the loss of a crew member. Seven people were rescued by rocket apparatus. She was on a voyage from Newcastle upon Tyne, Northumberland to Great Yarmouth, Norfolk.

=== 16 April ===
List of shipwrecks: 16 April 1815
Ship	State	Description
Fenix Triumphante	Portugal	The ship put into Dover, Kent, United Kingdom in a severely damaged state and subsequently sank. She was on a voyage from Rio de Janeiro to Rotterdam, South Holland, Netherlands and London, United Kingdom.

=== 17 April ===
List of shipwrecks: 17 April 1815
Ship	State	Description
Five unnamed vessels	United Kingdom	The fishing vessels were lost in the North Sea with the loss of all hands. One vessel was lost off Texel, North Holland, Netherlands with the loss of seven lives.

=== 18 April ===
List of shipwrecks: 18 April 1815
Ship	State	Description
Iris	(United Kingdom of Great Britain and Ireland)	The ship was driven ashore at Åberg, on the coast of Jutland. She was on a voyage from London to Stettin.

=== 19 April ===
List of shipwrecks: 19 April 1815
Ship	State	Description
Edward	(United Kingdom of Great Britain and Ireland) Saint Kitts	The ship sprang a leak and foundered in the Atlantic Ocean. Her crew were rescued by Lucille (France). Edward was on a voyage from Boston, Massachusetts, United States to Saint Kitts.

=== 20 April ===
List of shipwrecks: 20 April 1815
Ship	State	Description
Dorothea	Prussia	The ship ran aground on the North Sand Head, off the coast of Kent, United Kingdom. She was on a voyage from Memel to Topsham, Devon, United Kingdom. She was refloated and taken in to Ramsgate, Kent.

=== 21 April ===
List of shipwrecks: 21 April 1815
Ship	State	Description
Active	United Kingdom	The sloop was driven ashore and wrecked at Perran Downs, Cornwall with the loss of three of her crew. She was on a voyage from Cork to London.
Concord	United Kingdom	The brig foundered off Trevose Head, Cornwall.
Friends Goodwill	United Kingdom	The ship was driven ashore at Boscastle, Cornwall. She was on a voyage from Falmouth, Cornwall to Neath, Glamorgan.
Mary	United Kingdom	The ship was driven ashore and wrecked at Newquay, Cornwall.
Milo	United Kingdom	The ship was driven ashore near Liverpool, Lancashire. She was on a voyage from Liverpool to Boston, Massachusetts, United States. She was refloated and taken in to the River Mersey.
Severine Caroline	Norway	The ship ran aground at Havre de Grâce, Seine-Inférieure, France. Her crew were rescued. She was on a voyage from Havre-de-Grâce to Christiansand.

=== 22 April ===
List of shipwrecks: 22 April 1815
Ship	State	Description
Catherine	United Kingdom	The ship was wrecked at Memel, Prussia.
St. Ives	United Kingdom	The ship sprang a leak and foundered in the Atlantic Ocean off Land's End, Cornwall. Her crew survived. She was on a voyage from Falmouth, Cornwall to Bristol, Gloucestershire.

=== 24 April ===
List of shipwrecks: 24 April 1815
Ship	State	Description
De Frau Lucia	Stettin	The ship ran aground on the Goodwin Sands, Kent, United Kingdom. She was on a voyage from Bordeaux, Gironde, France to Stettin. She was refloated and taken in to Dover, Kent in a leaky condition.
Dolphin	United Kingdom	The sloop foundered off Padstow, Cornwall. Her crew were rescued.
Portrait	United States	The ship foundered in the Atlantic Ocean. Her crew were rescued by Charles (France). She was on a voyage from Bath, Maine, to Curaçao.
San Pedro de Alcantara	Spanish Navy	The ship of the line caught fire, exploded and sank in the Bay of Cumana.

=== 25 April ===
List of shipwrecks: 25 April 1815
Ship	State	Description
Anna and Maria	Netherlands	The ship was driven ashore at Ostend, West Flanders, Netherlands. Her crew were rescued. She was on a voyage from Bayonne, Basses-Pyrénées to Ostend.
August and Edward	France	The ship was driven ashore at Ostend. Her crew were rescued. She was on a voyage from Bayonne to Ostend. She was refloated on 27 April and taken in to Ostend.
Bonne Annette	France	The ship foundered in the English Channel whilst on a voyage from Cherbourg, Seine-Inférieure to Guernsey, Channel Islands.
George	United Kingdom	The ship sank in the Elbe. Her crew were rescued. She was on a voyage from Havana, Cuba to Hamburg.
Juffrouw Maria	France	The ship was driven ashore at Ostend. Her crew were rescued. She was refloated on 27 April and taken into Ostend.
Manchester Packet	United Kingdom	The ship was driven ashore on Tybee Island, Georgia, United States.
Mary	United Kingdom	The ship was driven ashore near Whitby, Yorkshire.

=== 27 April ===
List of shipwrecks: 27 April 1815
Ship	State	Description
George	United Kingdom	The ship was wrecked on Scharhörn, at the mouth of the Elbe. Her crew were rescued. She was on a voyage from Havana, Cuba to Hamburg.

=== 29 April ===
List of shipwrecks: 29 April 1815
Ship	State	Description
Anna Christina	Denmark	The ship foundered off "Nystadt", Zealand. She was on a voyage from Elsinore to Königsberg, Prussia, or from Lübeck to Königsberg.
Duke of Montrose	United Kingdom	The ship was lost at Barbados. She was on a voyage from Falmouth, Cornwall to the Leeward Islands
Stag	United Kingdom	The transport ship was wrecked near Halifax, Nova Scotia, British North America. All on board were rescued.

=== 30 April ===
List of shipwrecks: 30 April 1815
Ship	State	Description
HMS Penelope	Royal Navy	The fifth-rate frigate was wrecked at Cap des Rosiers, British North America with the loss of 40 of her crew.

=== Unknown date ===
List of shipwrecks: Unknown date in April 1815
Ship	State	Description
Albion	United Kingdom	The transport ship was driven ashore and wrecked at Ostend, West Flanders, Netherlands. Her crew were rescued.
Alexander & Mary	United Kingdom	The ship was driven ashore and wrecked near Donaghadee, County Down. She was on a voyage from Liverpool, Lancashire to Quebec city, Lower Canada, British North America
Ann Eliza	United Kingdom	The ship was lost at Lisbon, Portugal.
Better Luck Still	United Kingdom	The ship was driven ashore at Höganäs, Sweden in early April. She was on a voyage from London to Riga, Russia. Better Luck Still was refloated on 19 May and taken into Copenhagen, Denmark for repairs.
Cam's Delight	Great Britain	The ship was driven ashore at Seacombe, Cheshire. She was on a voyage from Dublin to Liverpool.
Charlotte	United Kingdom	The ship foundered in the Grand Banks of Newfoundland. Her crew were rescued. She was on a voyage from the Clyde to Miramichi Bay.
Ebenezer	Norway	The ship foundered off Fleckeroë. She was on a voyage from Tønsberg to an English port.
Heart of Oak	United Kingdom	The ship was lost near Whitby, Yorkshire.
Mary	United Kingdom	The ship was driven ashore. She was on a voyage from Havana, Cuba to Liverpool. She was refloated on 3 May and taken in to Liverpool.
Œolus	Prussia	The ship was driven ashore and wrecked between the Kole and Höganäs. She was on a voyage from London to Königsberg.
Patriot	United Kingdom	The ship was driven ashore on the Mull of Galloway, Ayrshire. She was on a voyage from Dumfries to Glasgow, Renfrewshire.
Pellew	United Kingdom	The ship was wrecked on the Yorkshire coast. Her crew were rescued. She was on a voyage from Newcastle upon Tyne, Northumberland to Great Yarmouth, Norfolk.
Planet	United Kingdom	The ship was driven ashore Cape Fear, North Carolina, United States early in April. Her crew survived. She was on a voyage from Liverpool to Bermuda. Planet was later refloated and taken in to Wilmington, Delaware, United States.
Portland	United Kingdom	The ship was driven ashore at Peterhead, Aberdeenshire. She was subsequently wrecked on 14 April.
Surprise	United States	The privateer, a schooner, was wrecked on the Burngeal Shoals, in the Atlantic Ocean off the coast of New York with the loss of 49 of her 137 crew.
Thomas	United Kingdom	The ship foundered on the Rose Sand, in the North Sea off Saltfleet, Lincolnshire. Her crew were rescued. She was on a voyage from Hull, Yorkshire to London.

== May ==
=== 1 May ===
List of shipwrecks: 1 May 1815
Ship	State	Description
Ploughman	United Kingdom	The ship sprang a leak and was beached at Corton, Suffolk, where she was subsequently wrecked. Her crew were rescued. She was on a voyage from Hull, Yorkshire to London.

=== 2 May ===
List of shipwrecks: 2 May 1815
Ship	State	Description
Princess Charlotte	United Kingdom	The ship ran aground at Demerara. She was refloated on 13 May and departed for Barbados.
Williams	United Kingdom	The ship became trapped in ice off Prince Edward Island, British North America and was abandoned. She was on a voyage from London to Prince Edward Island. Having been de-rigged by the local inhabitants, Williams was subsequently towed in to a harbour 17 nautical miles (31 km) from Charlottetown.

=== 3 May ===
List of shipwrecks: 3 May 1815
Ship	State	Description
Nicolette Jeanie	Netherlands	The ship was driven ashore on the coast of Surinam. She was on a voyage from Surinam to a Dutch port.

=== 6 May ===
List of shipwrecks: 6 May 1815
Ship	State	Description
Catuna Eleanora	Danzig	The ship ran aground on the Goodwin Sands, Kent, United Kingdom. She was on a voyage from Danzig to Bordeaux, Gironde, France. She was refloated and taken in to The Downs.
Charlotte	France	The ship was wrecked on the Goodwin Sands. Her crew were rescued. She was on a voyage from Bordeaux to Hamburg.
Roberts	United Kingdom	The ship was driven ashore on Wrangle Holm, Russia. She was on a voyage from London to Saint Petersburg, Russia. Roberts was refloated on 10 May and resumed her voyage.

=== 8 May ===
List of shipwrecks: 8 May 1815
Ship	State	Description
St. Petrus	Sweden	The ship was driven ashore on the west coast of Mainland, Orkney Islands, United Kingdom. She was on a voyage from Stockholm to Lisbon, Portugal. St. Petrus was refloated by 17 May and resumed her voyage.

=== 11 May ===
List of shipwrecks: 11 May 1815
Ship	State	Description
Bellona	Sweden	The ship was driven ashore and wrecked near Copenhagen, Denmark. She was on a voyage from Gotland to Cádiz, Spain.
Catherine	United Kingdom	The ship was driven ashore in Bootle Bay. She was on a voyage from Liverpool, Lancashire to Jamaica. She was refloated.
Spiredone	Malta	The ship was lost near Malta. She was on a voyage from Patras, Greece to Malta.
St. Nicolo	Malta	The ship was lost near Malta. She was on a voyage from Durazzo, Ottoman Empire to Malta.
Vigilant	United Kingdom	The ship was sunk by ice off St. John's, Newfoundland, British North America. Her crew were rescued. She was on a voyage from Liverpool to Newfoundland.

=== 13 May ===
List of shipwrecks: 13 May 1815
Ship	State	Description
Suwarrow	United Kingdom	The ship was lost near Trinity, Newfoundland, British North America. All on board were rescued. She was on a voyage from Liverpool, Lancashire to Newfoundland.
Wolfaren	Russia	The ship was driven ashore near Kirkwall, Orkney Islands, United Kingdom. She was on a voyage from Liverpool, Lancashire, United Kingdom to Rotterdam, South Holland, Netherlands.

=== 14 May ===
List of shipwrecks: 14 May 1815
Ship	State	Description
Neptune	United Kingdom	The ship foundered in St. Mary's Bay with the loss of her captain. She was on a voyage from the Clyde to Quebec City, Lower Canada, British North America.

=== 17 May ===
List of shipwrecks: 17 May 1815
Ship	State	Description
Mariner	United Kingdom	The brig was wrecked in Gaspee Bay.

=== 18 May ===
List of shipwrecks: 18 May 1815
Ship	State	Description
Ann	United Kingdom	The ship was driven ashore at Gibraltar. She was on a voyage from Gallipoli, Apulia to Bristol and Liverpool. Ann was refloated on 21 May.
Defiance	United States	The ship was driven ashore at Gibraltar.
Eliza	United Kingdom	The ship ran aground off Grand Canary and was wrecked with the loss of two of her crew. She was on a voyage from London to Tenerife, Canary Isles.
Melpomene	United Kingdom	The transport ship was driven ashore at Gibraltar.
Eliza	United Kingdom	The ship ran aground on a reef off Grand Canary and was wrecked with the loss of two of her crew. She was on a voyage from London to Tenerife, Canary Islands.

=== 19 May ===
List of shipwrecks: 19 May 1815
Ship	State	Description
Industry	United Kingdom	The ship was run down and sunk in the English Channel off South Foreland, Kent by Woodrop (United States). Her crew were rescued.

=== 22 May ===
List of shipwrecks: 22 May 1815
Ship	State	Description
Harriet	United Kingdom	The ship was driven ashore near the Black Rock. She was on a voyage from Liverpool, Lancashire to Newfoundland, British North America. Harriet was later refloated and taken in to Liverpool.

=== 26 May ===
List of shipwrecks: 26 May 1815
Ship	State	Description
Martin	United Kingdom	The ship ran aground on the Middle Bank, in Liverpool Bay. She was on a voyage from Liverpool, Lancashire to Wilmington, Delaware, United States. She was later refloated and taken into Liverpool for repairs.
Susannah	United Kingdom	The ship was driven ashore near Kuressaare, Russia. She was on a voyage from Riga, Russia to Newcastle upon Tyne, Northumberland.

=== 27 May ===
List of shipwrecks: 27 May 1815
Ship	State	Description
Goodwill	United Kingdom	The ship was driven ashore at Teignmouth, Devon. he was on a voyage from Teignmouth to Liverpool, Lancashire.

=== 29 May ===
List of shipwrecks: 29 May 1815
Ship	State	Description
Union	United Kingdom	The ship was driven ashore at Peniche, Portugal. She was on a voyage from a Spanish port to Newfoundland, British North America.

=== 30 May ===
List of shipwrecks: 30 May 1815
Ship	State	Description
Arniston	British East India Company	The East Indiaman was wrecked at Waenhuiskrans, Cape Colony with the loss of 372 of the 378 people on board.

=== Unknown date ===
List of shipwrecks: Unknown date in May 1815
Ship	State	Description
Alexander	United Kingdom	The ship was lost off the Orkney Islands. She was on a voyage from London to Halifax, Nova Scotia, British North America.
Brothers	United Kingdom	The ship ran aground at South Shields, County Durham and was severely damaged. She was on a voyage from South Shields to Copenhagen, Denmark. She was refloated and put back to South Shields.
Doris	United Kingdom	The transport ship was wrecked at Cape Chat, Lower Canada, British North America in early May.
Freedom	United States	The ship was wrecked on Öland, Sweden in mid-May. She was on a voyage from Saint Petersburg, Russia to Salem, Massachusetts.
Lord Wellington	United Kingdom	The transport ship was driven ashore and damaged near Cape Rozieur, Lower Canada. She was later refloated and taken in to Gaspé Bay.
Marie	France	The ship sprang a leak in the English Channel and was abandoned by her crew. She was later discovered by HMS Pickle (Royal Navy) and taken in to Portsmouth, Hampshire, United Kingdom.
Prince George of Quebec	United Kingdom	The ship was driven ashore at Domesnes, Norway.
United Kingdom	United Kingdom	The ship foundered off the Cape of Good Hope. About 27 of her crew were rescued. She was on a voyage from Batavia, Netherlands East Indies to London.

== June ==
=== 2 June ===
List of shipwrecks: 2 June 1815
Ship	State	Description
Adelle	United States	The ship capsized whilst on a voyage from Philadelphia, Pennsylvania, to Saint Domingo. Her crew were rescued.
Charlotte and Heloise	Bremen	The ship was driven ashore on Eierland. Her crew were rescued. She was on a voyage from Saint Thomas, Virgin Islands to Bremen.

=== 4 June ===
List of shipwrecks: 4 June 1815
Ship	State	Description
Owthorne	United Kingdom	The ship sprang a leak in the Atlantic Ocean and was abandoned by her crew. She was on a voyage from Jamaica to London. Owthorne was subsequently discovered on 17 June by Berkeley (United Kingdom). A skeleton crew were put on board, and she was sent in to Halifax, Nova Scotia, British North America.

=== 7 June ===
List of shipwrecks: 7 June 1815
Ship	State	Description
Madame Royale	France	The ship was lost west of Martinique. Her crew were rescued. She was on a voyage from Havre de Grâce, Seine-Inférieure to Martinique.

=== 8 June ===
List of shipwrecks: 8 June 1815
Ship	State	Description
Active	Portugal	The ship was wrecked on the Banks of Cora. Her crew were rescued. She was on a voyage from Lisbon to Philadelphia, Pennsylvania, United States.

=== 10 June ===
List of shipwrecks: 10 June 1815
Ship	State	Description
Neva (Нева)	Imperial Russian Navy	The hemmema was struck by lightning and severely damaged at Kronstadt.

=== 12 June ===
List of shipwrecks: 12 June 1815
Ship	State	Description
Eliza	United Kingdom	The ship was wrecked on a reef in the Torres Straits.
Prince George	United Kingdom	The ship was driven ashore at Domesnes, Norway. She was on a voyage from Riga, Russia to Sheerness, Kent.

=== 13 June ===
List of shipwrecks: 13 June 1815
Ship	State	Description
Argo	United Kingdom	The ship was driven ashore and wrecked at Southwold, Suffolk. She was on a voyage from Sunderland, County Durham to Southwold.
Bridlington	United Kingdom	The ship capsized and sank in the North Sea off Mundesley, Norfolk, with the loss of a crew member. She was on a voyage from Bridlington, Yorkshire to London.
Speculation	United Kingdom	The ship foundered in the English Channel off Hastings, Sussex. Her crew were rescued by HMRC Duke of York ( HM Board of Customs).
Suwarrow	United Kingdom	The ship was lost near Trinity, Newfoundland, British North America. All on board were rescued. She was on a voyage from Liverpool, Lancashire to Newfoundland.
Tees	United Kingdom	The ship foundered in the North Sea off Whitby, Yorkshire.

=== 15 June ===
List of shipwrecks: 15 June 1815
Ship	State	Description
Argo	United Kingdom	The ship struck the pier at Southwold, Suffolk and was wrecked. She was on a voyage from Sunderland, County Durham to Southwold.
Nimrod	Prussia	The ship was driven ashore and wrecked at Lisbon, Portugal.

=== 18 June ===
List of shipwrecks: 18 June 1815
Ship	State	Description
Hannah	United Kingdom	The ship was driven ashore and wrecked near Whitby, Yorkshire.
Hero	United Kingdom	The ship ran aground at Oporto, Portugal. She was on a voyage from Oporto to London. She was refloated and put back to Oporto the next day for repairs.
Isabella	United Kingdom	The ship was driven ashore and wrecked near Whitby.
Tees	United Kingdom	The ship was driven ashore and wrecked at Whitby.

=== 19 June ===
List of shipwrecks: 19 June 1815
Ship	State	Description
Farmer	United Kingdom	The ship was wrecked on Wood Key. Her crew were rescued. She was on a voyage from Nassau, Bahamas to Charleston, South Carolina, United States.

=== 21 June ===
List of shipwrecks: 21 June 1815
Ship	State	Description
Betsey	United Kingdom	The ship was driven ashore and wrecked at New Romney, Kent. She was on a voyage from London to Bengal, India.
Cumberland	United Kingdom	The ship struck a sunken rock off Rathlin Island, County Antrim and foundered. Her crew were rescued by HMRC Wickham ( HM Board of Customs).

=== 22 June ===
List of shipwrecks: 22 June 1815
Ship	State	Description
Betsey	United Kingdom	The ship was driven ashore at New Romney, Kent. She was on a voyage from London to Bengal, India. She became a wreck the next day.
Oscar	United Kingdom	The ship ran aground at Leith, Lothian and was damaged. She was on a voyage from Virginia, United States to Leith. She was refloated.

=== 24 June ===
List of shipwrecks: 24 June 1815
Ship	State	Description
Prince George	(United Kingdom of Great Britain and Ireland) British North America	The ship was driven ashore near Domesnes, Norway. She was on a voyage from Riga, Russia to Quebec City, Lower Canada.
Union	Prussia	The ship was driven ashore and wrecked at Lisbon, Portugal.

=== 25 June ===
List of shipwrecks: 25 June 1815
Ship	State	Description
Matilda	United Kingdom	The ship sprang a leak and foundered off Curaçao. Her crew were rescued by Manchioneal (United Kingdom).

=== 26 June ===
List of shipwrecks: 26 June 1815
Ship	State	Description
Erstatning	Norway	The ship was driven ashore on Callantsoog, North Holland, Netherlands. She was on a voyage from Newcastle upon Tyne, Northumberland, United Kingdom to a Norwegian port.

=== 27 June ===
List of shipwrecks: 27 June 1815
Ship	State	Description
Resolution	United States	The ship foundered in the Atlantic Ocean whilst on a voyage from Savannah, Georgia, to New York. Her crew were rescued.

=== 29 June ===
List of shipwrecks: 29 June 1815
Ship	State	Description
Comet	United Kingdom	The ship was wrecked on the West Hoyle Sandbank, in Liverpool Bay. Her crew were rescued. She was on a voyage from Dublin to Chester, Cheshire.

=== 30 June ===
List of shipwrecks: 30 June 1815
Ship	State	Description
Warrior	United States	The ship was lost on the Grand Bahama Bank. Her crew were rescued. She was on a voyage from New York to Havana, Captaincy General of Cuba.

=== Unknown date ===
List of shipwrecks: Unknown date in June 1815
Ship	State	Description
Active	Portugal	The ship departed from Nantes, Loire-Inférieure, France for Lisbon. No further trace, presumed foundered with the loss of all hands.
Adeona	United Kingdom	The ship was driven ashore on Anticosti Island, British North America. Her crew were rescued. She was on a voyage from the Clyde to Quebec City, Lower Canada, British North America. Adeona was refloated in late May or early June 1816. She arrived at Quebec City on 6 June 1816.
Aurora	United Kingdom	The ship ran aground at Newport, Monmouthshire. She was on a voyage from Ocracoke, North Carolina, United States to Bristol, Gloucestershire. She was refloated and put back to Newport in a leaky condition.
Bredemar	Netherlands	War of 1812: The ship was captured in the Indian Ocean by USS Peacock (United States Navy). She was set afire and sunk.
Freedom	United States	The ship was driven ashore on Öland, Sweden. She was on a voyage from Saint Petersburg, Russia to Salem, Massachusetts.
Henrys	United Kingdom	The ship was driven ashore on Gotland, Sweden. She was on a voyage from Copenhagen, Denmark, to a Baltic port. Henrys was later refloated and taken in to Kilbingsholm for repairs.
Jane & Peggy	United Kingdom	The ship was wrecked near Stackpole, Pembrokeshire. She was on a voyage from Ross-on-Wye, Herefordshire to Cardigan.
Juno	United Kingdom	The ship was driven ashore on Læsø, Denmark. She was on a voyage from Newcastle upon Tyne, Northumberland to Kiel, Duchy of Holstein. She was later refloated.
Raikes	United Kingdom	The ship was driven ashore on Saltholm, Denmark. She was on a voyage from Danzig to London.
Union	United Kingdom	War of 1812: The ship was captured in the Indian Ocean by USS Peacock (United States Navy). She was set afire and sunk.
Unnamed	Hamburg	The ship struck a sunken wreck off "Ortsholm" and foundered. She was on a voyage from Hamburg to Saint Petersburg.

== July ==
=== 2 July ===
List of shipwrecks: 2 July 1815
Ship	State	Description
Ceres	United Kingdom	The ship sank at King's Lynn, Norfolk. She was on a voyage from Pwllheli, Caernarfonshire to King's Lynn.
Unnamed	Flag unknown	The ship was discovered at sea in a wrecked condition. She was taken in to Great Yarmouth, Norfolk.
Unnamed	France	Napoleonic Wars: The schooner, a prize, foundered off Land's End, Cornwall, United Kingdom with the loss of three of her crew.

=== 4 July ===
List of shipwrecks: 4 July 1815
Ship	State	Description
Alert	United Kingdom	The brig was wrecked at Mistaken Point, Newfoundland with the loss of four lives.
Flora	United Kingdom	The ship sprang a leak and was beached at Domesnes, Norway. She was on a voyage from Riga, Russia to London.

=== 5 July ===
List of shipwrecks: 5 July 1815
Ship	State	Description
Eagle	United Kingdom	The ship was driven ashore at New Orleans, Louisiana.

=== 6 July ===
List of shipwrecks: 6 July 1815
Ship	State	Description
Ann	Portugal	The ship was wrecked near Bahia, Brazil. She was on a voyage from Liverpool, Lancashire, United Kingdom to Bahia.
Industry	United Kingdom	The schooner was sunk off Lisbon, Portugal by a broadside from Midas (United Kingdom), which mistook her for a French privateer. Her crew were rescued. She was on a voyage from London to Tenerife, Canary Islands.

=== 8 July ===
List of shipwrecks: 8 July 1815
Ship	State	Description
Endeavour	United Kingdom	The ship was wrecked on Horn Head, Newfoundland, British North America.

=== 9 July ===
List of shipwrecks: 9 July 1815
Ship	State	Description
Endeavour	United Kingdom	The ship was lost at Cape Bollard, Newfoundland, British North America. All on board were rescued. She was on a voyage from Cork to Quebec City, Lower Canada, British North America.

=== 10 July ===
List of shipwrecks: 10 July 1815
Ship	State	Description
Tiviot	United Kingdom	The ship foundered in the Atlantic Ocean. All fourteen crew were rescued by Brothers (United Kingdom). She was on a voyage from North Shields, County Durham to Miramichi, New Brunswick, British North America.

=== 11 July ===
List of shipwrecks: 11 July 1815
Ship	State	Description
W P Johnston	United Kingdom	The ship was driven ashore at Davis Point, Delaware, United States. She was on a voyage from London to Philadelphia, Pennsylvania, United States.

=== 12 July ===
List of shipwrecks: 12 July 1815
Ship	State	Description
Live Oak	United Kingdom	The ship caught fire, exploded and sank off Southampton, New York, United States. Her crew survived. She was on a voyage from Leith, Lothian to New York City.

=== 13 July ===
List of shipwrecks: 13 July 1815
Ship	State	Description
Alexander	Russia	The ship was driven ashore at Helsingør, Denmark. She was on a voyage from the Mediterranean to Saint Petersburg. Alexander was later refloated and taken in to Copenhagen, Denmark for repairs.
Pacific	United States	The ship was wrecked in the Jardines de la Reina, Cuba. Her crew were rescued. She was on a voyage from San Domingue to Boston, Massachusetts.
Peace	United Kingdom	The ship ran aground on the Harvey Furlow Rocks. She was later refloated and taken into Cemaes Bay. Peace was on a voyage from Liverpool, Lancashire to Wexford.
Twee Gebroeders	Netherlands	The ship was lost at Texel, North Holland.

=== 15 July ===
List of shipwrecks: 15 July 1815
Ship	State	Description
Alexander	Russia	The ship was driven ashore near Helsingør, Denmark. She was on a voyage from a Mediterranean port to Saint Petersburg. Alexander was later refloated and taken in to Copenhagen, Denmark for repairs.

=== 16 July ===
List of shipwrecks: 16 July 1815
Ship	State	Description
Aimwell	United Kingdom	The ship struck rocks off Rattray Head, Aberdeenshire and was subsequently wrecked in a gale on 26 August. She was on a voyage from Miramichi, New Brunswick, British North America to Grangemouth, Stirlingshire.

=== 19 July ===
List of shipwrecks: 19 July 1815
Ship	State	Description
David Scott	United Kingdom	The ship was driven ashore at Bombay, India. She was refloated.
Diana	United Kingdom	The ship was wrecked south west of A Coruña, Spain. She was on a voyage from Liverpool, Lancashire to Vigo, Spain.

=== 24 July ===
List of shipwrecks: 24 July 1815
Ship	State	Description
Antigonius	United Kingdom	The ship ran aground on the North Flat, in Liverpool Bay. She was on a voyage from Liverpool, Lancashire to Ostend, West Flanders, Netherlands. She was refloated and put back to Liverpool for repairs.

=== 26 July ===
List of shipwrecks: 26 July 1815
Ship	State	Description
Dasher	United Kingdom	The ship sprang a leak and foundered whilst on a voyage from Cork to Weymouth, Dorset. Her crew survived.
Duke of Wellington	United Kingdom	The ship was wrecked at Ostend, West Flanders, Netherlands with the loss of one life. She was on a voyage from Ostend to Dover, Kent.

=== Unknown date ===
List of shipwrecks: Unknown date in July 1815
Ship	State	Description
Adventure	United Kingdom	The ship was driven ashore at Willongby Point, Norfolk.
Benjamin	United Kingdom	The ship was wrecked near Happisburgh, Norfolk.
Concordia	United Kingdom	The ship was lost at Washington, North Carolina, United States. She was on a voyage from Washington to Liverpool, Lancashire.
USS Epervier	United States Navy	The Cruizer-class brig-sloop disappeared in the Atlantic Ocean with the loss of all 137 aboard during a voyage from the Mediterranean Sea to the United States sometime after passing Gibraltar on 14 July 1815.
Fermis	Spain	The ship sprang a leak and was abandoned in the Atlantic Ocean. Her crew survived. She was on a voyage from St. Andero to Havana, Cuba.
Madona Turliani	Ottoman Empire	The ship was lost near Missolonghi, Greece. She was on a voyage from Morea to Lisbon, Portugal.
Maria	Trieste	The ship foundered in the Mediterranean Sea off Sardinia with the loss of all but one of her crew. She was on a voyage from Marseille, Bouches-du-Rhône, France to Trieste.
HMS Thrush	Royal Navy	The powder hulk sank at Port Royal, Jamaica. She was subsequently salvaged and sold.
Wellington	United Kingdom	The ship was wrecked at Ostend, West Flanders. Netherlands with the loss of one life.

== August ==
=== 6 August ===
List of shipwrecks: 6 August 1815
Ship	State	Description
Ann	Portugal	The ship was wrecked on the coast of Bahia, Brazil. She was on a voyage from Liverpool, Lancashire, United Kingdom to Bahia.
Barbadoes	United Kingdom	The ship ran aground on the Platters Rocks, in the Irish Sea. She refloated but consequently sank. Barbadoes was on a voyage from Liverpool to Maranhão, Brazil.

=== 7 August ===
List of shipwrecks: 7 August 1815
Ship	State	Description
Essex	United Kingdom	The sloop was driven ashore in a hurricane at Bermuda.

=== 8 August ===
List of shipwrecks: 8 August 1815
Ship	State	Description
Cynthia	United States	The ship capsized in the Atlantic Ocean. She was on a voyage from Providence, Rhode Island, to Martinique.
Patriot	United Kingdom	The ship capsized in the Atlantic Ocean. Only two of her crew survived until 18 August, when they were rescued by Hunter (United States).

=== 9 August ===
List of shipwrecks: 9 August 1815
Ship	State	Description
Comet	United Kingdom	The ship foundered south of Bermuda. Her crew were rescued by America (United States). Comet was on a voyage from Surinam to London.
Fanny	United Kingdom	The ship was dismasted and was abandoned by her crew. They were rescued by Aurora and Lord Wellington (both United Kingdom). Fanny was on a voyage from St. Domingo to Liverpool, Lancashire. She was discovered at sea on 19 August by Prince of Orange (United Kingdom), which put a skeleton crew on board and sent her for Halifax, Nova Scotia, British North America.
Hamilton	United Kingdom	The ship capsized. One survivor was rescued by John (United Kingdom). Hamilton was on a voyage from Jamaica to London.
Jamaica	United Kingdom	The ship was abandoned in the Atlantic Ocean whilst on a voyage from Jamaica to Bristol, Gloucestershire. Her crew were rescued by Hartley (United Kingdom), which lost her captain during the rescue.
Jonge Daniel	Netherlands	The ship foundered off the Norwegian coast. She was on a voyage from Zierikzee, South Holland to Riga, Russia.

=== 10 August ===
List of shipwrecks: 10 August 1815
Ship	State	Description
Alexander	United Kingdom	The ship was abandoned in the Atlantic Ocean whilst on a voyage from Jamaica to London. Her crew were rescued by Britannia (United Kingdom).
Cumberland	United Kingdom	The ship was abandoned in the Atlantic Ocean whilst on a voyage from Jamaica to Whitehaven, Cumberland. Her crew were rescued by Barrett (United Kingdom). Cumberland was discovered on 12 August by Happy Couple (United States). She was taken in to Salem, Massachusetts, United States.
George	United Kingdom	The ship was in collision with HMS Warrior (Royal Navy) in the Atlantic Ocean and foundered with the loss of four lives. HMS Warrior and HMS Electra (Royal Navy) and rescued survivors. George was on a voyage from Jamaica to Portsmouth, Hampshire.
Jane	United Kingdom	The ship was abandoned in the Atlantic Ocean whilst on a voyage from Jamaica to Bristol, Gloucestershire. Her crew were rescued by Ethelred (United Kingdom).
Sylph	United Kingdom	The ship was wrecked off Barbados. Her crew were rescued. She was on a voyage from Gibraltar to the West Indies.

=== 11 August ===
List of shipwrecks: 11 August 1815
Ship	State	Description
Chance	United Kingdom	The ship was wrecked on Bornholm, Denmark. Her crew were rescued. She was on a voyage from Memel, Prussia to Irvine, Ayrshire, United Kingdom.
Hope	United Kingdom	The ship was abandoned in the Atlantic Ocean whilst on a voyage from Jamaica to Glasgow, Renfrewshire, United Kingdom. Her crew were rescued by Orestes (United Kingdom).

=== 13 August ===
List of shipwrecks: 13 August 1815
Ship	State	Description
Barbara	United Kingdom	The ship was wrecked on the Herd Sand, in the North Sea off the coast of County Durham with the loss of a crew member. She was on a voyage from Newcastle upon Tyne to Dundee, Forfarshire.
Ruby	United Kingdom	The transport ship was driven ashore west of West Flanders, Netherlands. Her crew were rescued. She was refloated on 21 August and taken in to Ostend.

=== 14 August ===
List of shipwrecks: 14 August 1815
Ship	State	Description
Andrew	United Kingdom	The ship was driven ashore at Bangor, County Down. She was on a voyage from Antigua to Belfast, County Antrim.
Madescha	Netherlands	The ship was driven ashore on the Dutch coast. She was later refloated and taken in to Hellevoet, South Holland.

=== 15 August ===
List of shipwrecks: 15 August 1815
Ship	State	Description
HMS Dominica	Royal Navy	The schooner ran aground on a reef off Bermuda and was wrecked.
Irvine	United Kingdom	The ship was lost near the Farne Islands, Northumberland. Her crew were rescued. She was on a voyage from Leith, Lothian to Newcastle upon Tyne, Northumberland.

=== 16 August ===
List of shipwrecks: 16 August 1815
Ship	State	Description
Diana	United States	The ship sprang a leak in the Atlantic Ocean. All on board were rescued by Trident (United States. Diana was on a voyage from Bremen to Baltimore, Maryland.

=== 17 August ===
List of shipwrecks: 17 August 1815
Ship	State	Description
Hector	United Kingdom	The ship was driven ashore in the Clyde.
Johanna Charlotte	Lübeck	The ship ran aground on the Goodwin Sands, Kent, United Kingdom. Her crew were rescued. She was on a voyage from Lübeck to Oporto, Portugal.

=== 18 August ===
List of shipwrecks: 18 August 1815
Ship	State	Description
Abeona	United Kingdom	The ship struck a rock off the Runnel Stone and foundered. Her crew were rescued. She was on a voyage from Poole, Dorset to Liverpool, Lancashire and Newfoundland, British North America.
Elizabeth	United Kingdom	The ship foundered in the Baltic Sea off Bornholm, Denmark. Her crew were rescued.

=== 19 August ===
List of shipwrecks: 19 August 1815
Ship	State	Description
Fanny	United Kingdom	The ship was discovered abandoned in the Atlantic Ocean by Prince of Orange (United Kingdom, which put four of her crew aboard. Fanny was on a voyage from Saint Domingo to London. She was taken in to Halifax, Nova Scotia, British North America on 9 September.
Four Friends	United Kingdom	The ship was driven ashore and wrecked in the Weser. She was on a voyage from London to Bremen.

=== 20 August ===
List of shipwrecks: 20 August 1815
Ship	State	Description
Jonge Casparus	Netherlands	The ship foundered off the Norwegian coast. She was on a voyage from Amsterdam, North Holland to Christiansand, Norway.

=== 21 August ===
List of shipwrecks: 21 August 1815
Ship	State	Description
Malvina	United Kingdom	The ship departed from The Downs for Newfoundland, British North America. No further trace, presumed foundered with the loss of all hands.

=== 22 August ===
List of shipwrecks: 22 August 1815
Ship	State	Description
Lowther	United Kingdom	The ship was in collision with Prosperous (United Kingdom) in the Irish Sea and sank with the loss of six of the twelve people on board.
William & Nancy	United States	The ship was lost on the Hogsty Reef. Her crew were rescued. She was on a voyage from Port-au-Prince, Haiti to Baltimore, Maryland.

=== 23 August ===
List of shipwrecks: 23 August 1815
Ship	State	Description
Perseverance	United States	The ship was driven ashore on Öland, Sweden. She was on a voyage from Saint Petersburg, Russia to Providence, Rhode Island. Perseverance was later refloated and taken in to Kalmar, Sweden.
William and Nancy	United States	The ship was wrecked on the Hogsty Reef. She was on a voyage from Port-au-Prince, Haiti to Baltimore, Maryland.

=== 25 August ===
List of shipwrecks: 25 August 1815
Ship	State	Description
Seven Sisters	United Kingdom	The ship was sunk by ice in the Strait of Belle Isle. Her crew were rescued. She was on a voyage from Aberdeen to Halifax, Nova Scotia, British North America.

=== 26 August ===
List of shipwrecks: 26 August 1815
Ship	State	Description
Anna Christina	Denmark	The ship foundered off Nystad. She was on a voyage from Lübeck to Copenhagen.
Dasher	United Kingdom	The ship foundered in the Irish Sea. Her crew survived. She was on a voyage from Cork to Weymouth, Dorset.
Finchett	United Kingdom	The ship was driven ashore on Öland, Sweden. She was on a voyage from Saint Petersburg, Russia to Liverpool, Lancashire. Fincett was later refloated and taken in to Kalmar, Sweden.
New Diligent	United Kingdom	The ship departed Arkhangelsk, Russia for Lisbon, Portugal. No further trace; presumed foundered with the loss of all hands.

=== 28 August ===
List of shipwrecks: 28 August 1815
Ship	State	Description
Commerce	United States	The ship was wrecked off "Cape Bagadore", Morocco. Her twelve crew were rescued, but enslaved by their rescuers. She was on a voyage from Gibraltar to the Cape Verde Islands, Portugal.

=== 29 August ===
List of shipwrecks: 29 August 1815
Ship	State	Description
Abeona	United Kingdom	The transport ship was last sighted on this date whilst on a voyage from Halifax, Nova Scotia, British North America to Bermuda.
Anversoise	France	The ship departed from Havana, Cuba for a European port. No further trace, presumed foundered with the loss of all hands.
Pacific	United Kingdom	The ship foundered off "Wingo" with the loss of two of her crew. She was on a voyage from Hull, Yorkshire to Saint Petersburg, Russia.

=== 30 August ===
List of shipwrecks: 30 August 1815
Ship	State	Description
Predade	Portugal	The brig capsized at Lisbon.

=== Unknown date ===
List of shipwrecks: Unknown date in August 1815
Ship	State	Description
Augustus	United States	The ship capsized in the Atlantic Ocean before 28 August. She was on a voyage from Bath, Maine to Gibraltar. She was subsequently towed into a port in Nova Scotia, British North America.
Elizabeth	United Kingdom	The ship was driven ashore and damaged near Dragør, Denmark. She was on a voyage from Saint Petersburg, Russia to Montrose, Forfarshire. Elizabeth was later refloated and put into Dragør for repairs.
Elizabeth Magdalena	Sweden	The ship ran ashore in the Elbe near "Freyburg". She was on a voyage from Gothenburg to Rotterdam, South Holland, Netherlands. She was refloated.
Ganges	United Kingdom	The ship ran aground in the Saint Lawrence River. She was refloated and taken in to Quebec City, British North America for repairs.
Jonge Jacob	Netherlands	The ship sprang a leak and foundered off the Norwegian coast. She was on a voyage from Zierikzee, South Holland to Riga, Russia.
Leviathan	United Kingdom	The ship was driven ashore on the Falsterbo Reef, off the coast of Sweden. She was on a voyage from Liverpool, Lancashire to Reval, Russia. She was subsequently wrecked.
Lord Blantyre	United Kingdom	The ship was wrecked on the Southern Four Keys. She was on a voyage from Greenock, Renfrewshire to Jamaica.
Margaret	United Kingdom	The ship was driven ashore near Dragør. She was on a voyage from Saint Petersburg to Dublin. Margaret was later refloated and resumed her voyage.
Spring	United Kingdom	The ship was wrecked on the Cape Romain Shoals, in the Atlantic Ocean off South Carolina, United States at the end of August. She was on a voyage from Liverpool to Wilmington, Delaware, United States.

== September ==
=== 1 September ===
List of shipwrecks: 1 September 1815
Ship	State	Description
Halcyon	United Kingdom	The brig foundered in the Atlantic Ocean. She was on a voyage from Savannah, Georgia, United States to Liverpool, Lancashire.

=== 2 September ===
List of shipwrecks: 2 September 1815
Ship	State	Description
Radnor	United Kingdom	The ship was destroyed by fire off Sagar Island with the loss of thirteen of her crew.

=== 3 September ===
List of shipwrecks: 3 September 1815
Ship	State	Description
Bristol	United States	The ship capsized and sank whilst on a voyage from Wilmington, Delaware, to Barbados. Six of her crew were rescued by Neptune (United States).
Chance	United Kingdom	The ship was wrecked on the Haisborough Sands, in the North Sea off the coast of Norfolk. She was on a voyage from Sunderland, County Durham to London.
Shark	United Kingdom	The ship was wrecked in the Orkney Islands. Her crew were rescued. She was on a voyage from Fårö, Sweden to Liverpool, Lancashire.

=== 4 September ===
List of shipwrecks: 4 September 1815
Ship	State	Description
Cicero	United States	The ship sprang a leak and was beached at Sandy Hook, New Jersey. She was on a voyage from New York to Port-au-Prince, Haiti.
Edward	United Kingdom	The ship ran ashore in the River Mersey. She was on a voyage from Jamaica to Liverpool, Lancashire. She was refloated.
Eliza	United States	The brig foundered in the Atlantic Ocean. Her crew were rescued after a fortnight by Abel (United Kingdom).
Hamilton	United Kingdom	The full-rigged ship was driven ashore at Norfolk, Virginia, United States.
James	United Kingdom	The ship was driven ashore and severely damaged on Amrum, Duchy of Holstein. She was on a voyage from Liverpool, Lancashire to Hamburg. James was later refloated.
St. Andrew	United Kingdom	The full-rigged ship was driven ashore at Norfolk, Virginia.

=== 5 September ===
List of shipwrecks: 5 September 1815
Ship	State	Description
Hazard	United Kingdom	The ship struck the Hailstone Rock, in the North Sea off the Farne Islands, Northumberland, and sank. She was on a voyage from Virginia, United States to Newcastle upon Tyne, Northumberland.
Margaret	United Kingdom	The ship was wrecked on Scharhörn. Her crew were rescued. She was on a voyage from Greenock, Renfrewshire to Hamburg.
Planter	United Kingdom	The ship struck the Ridge Sand or Lemon and Ore Sand and capsized. Her crew survived. She was on a voyage from Saint Petersburg, Russia to London. Planter was subsequently taken in to Harwich, Essex.

=== 6 September ===
List of shipwrecks: 6 September 1815
Ship	State	Description
Adrian	United Kingdom	The ship was wrecked on the Outclippers, in the Baltic Sea off Karlskrona, Sweden. Her crew were rescued. She was on a voyage from Hull, Yorkshire to Stockholm, Sweden.
Eliza	United Kingdom	The schooner was in collision with Caroline (United Kingdom) in the English Channel off Dodman Point, Cornwall and foundered. Her crew were rescued. Eliza was on a voyage from Neath, Glamorgan to Dartmouth, Devon.
Jamaica	United Kingdom	The ship departed from New York, United States for Jamaica. No further trace, presumed foundered with the loss of all hands.

=== 7 September ===
List of shipwrecks: 7 September 1815
Ship	State	Description
Adrian	United Kingdom	The ship was wrecked at Karlskrona, Sweden. Her crew were rescued. She was on a voyage from Hull, Yorkshire to Stockholm, Sweden.
Johns	United Kingdom	The ship departed from Milford Haven, Pembrokeshire for Pictou, Nova Scotia, British North America. No further trace, presumed foundered with the loss of all hands.
Resolution	United Kingdom	The ship ran aground off the Isle of Sheppey, Kent.

=== 8 September ===
List of shipwrecks: 8 September 1815
Ship	State	Description
Endymion	United Kingdom	The ship departed from Guadeloupe for Baltimore, Maryland, United States. No further trace, presumed foundered with the loss of all hands.
Nymph	United Kingdom	The ship sprang a leak and was abandoned off Heligoland. She was on a voyage from Hull, Yorkshire to Saint Petersburg, Russia.
Planter	United Kingdom	The ship ran aground in the North Sea off Great Yarmouth, Norfolk and was wrecked. Her crew survived. She was on a voyage from Saint Petersburg, Russia to London.

=== 10 September ===
List of shipwrecks: 10 September 1815
Ship	State	Description
Drie Gebroeders	Netherlands	The ship was driven ashore and wrecked at Tönningen, Duchy of Holstein. She was on a voyage from Riga, Russia to Rotterdam, South Holland.
Zeeploeg	Netherlands	The ship was struck by lightning and destroyed by fire in the South China Sea (4°42′N 105°12′E). She was on a voyage from Batavia, Netherlands East Indies to China.

=== 11 September ===
List of shipwrecks: 11 September 1815
Ship	State	Description
Union	United Kingdom	The ship foundered off Cartagena, Spain with some loss of life. She was on a voyage from Gibraltar to Valencia, Spain.

=== 13 September ===
List of shipwrecks: 13 September 1815
Ship	State	Description
Betsey	United Kingdom	The ship departed from Valencia, Spain for Newfoundland. No further trace, presumed foundered in the Atlantic Ocean with the loss of all hands.
Walker	United States	The ship was wrecked on the American coast with the loss of all but one of her crew. She was on a voyage from Virginia to Cork, United Kingdom.

=== 14 September ===
List of shipwrecks: 14 September 1815
Ship	State	Description
Echo	United Kingdom	The ship foundered in the Atlantic Ocean. Her crew were rescued.
Neptune	United States	The ship capsized in the Atlantic Ocean. Her crew were rescued. She was on a voyage from Boston, Massachusetts, to Havana, Cuba.

=== 15 September ===
List of shipwrecks: 15 September 1815
Ship	State	Description
Ceres	United Kingdom	The ship was driven ashore in the River Mersey. She was on a voyage from St. Domingo to Liverpool, Lancashire.

=== 16 September ===
List of shipwrecks: 16 September 1815
Ship	State	Description
Hyperion	United Kingdom	The ship ran aground on Summer's Island whilst on a voyage from Saint Petersburg, Russia to Sunderland, County Durham. She was refloated on 8 October.
Washington	United States	The ship foundered in the Grand Banks of Newfoundland. Her crew took to a boat. They were rescued on 19 September byBraddock (United Kingdom). Washington was on a voyage from Lisbon, Portugal to New York.

=== 18 September ===
List of shipwrecks: 18 September 1815
Ship	State	Description
Betsey	(United Kingdom of Great Britain and Ireland) India	The ship was abandoned in the Pacific Ocean 20 nautical miles (37 km) off the Bay of Islands with the ultimate loss of six of her twelve crew. She was on a voyage from Sydney, New South Wales to Macquarie Island. Betsey later came ashore in Great Exhibition Bay and was wrecked.
Croydon	United Kingdom	The ship ran aground on the Cable Ground, in the Baltic Sea, and foundered. Her crew were rescued. She was on a voyage from Saint Petersburg, Russia to Portsmouth, Hampshire.
Elizabeth	United Kingdom	The ship was wrecked off Falsterbo, Sweden. Her crew survived. She was on a voyage from Memel, Prussia to Newhaven, Sussex.
Weazel	United Kingdom	The ship was driven ashore at Dipper Harbour, New Brunswick British North America. She was on a voyage from New York, United States to Saint John, New Brunswick. She was refloated and towed in to Dipper Harbour.

=== 19 September ===
List of shipwrecks: 19 September 1815
Ship	State	Description
Dennison	United Kingdom	The ship ran aground on the Holm Sand, in the North Sea and was consequently beached at Great Yarmouth, Norfolk. She was on a voyage from Zante, United States of the Ionian Islands to Hull, Yorkshire. She was refloated in mid-October.
Sea Horse	India	The brig was lost near Madras, India.

=== 20 September ===
List of shipwrecks: 20 September 1815
Ship	State	Description
Dennison	United Kingdom	The ship ran aground on the Corton Sand, in the North Sea off the coast of Suffolk. She was consequently beached at Great Yarmouth, Norfolk. Her crew were rescued. Dennison was on a voyage from Zante, United States of the Ionian Islands to Hull, Yorkshire.
Peace and Plenty	United States	The ship was wrecked in a hurricane in the Turks Islands with the loss of 22 lives.
Windham	United Kingdom	The country ship was wrecked on the Brunswick Rock. Her crew were rescued. She was on a voyage from Bengal, India to China.

=== 21 September ===
List of shipwrecks: 21 September 1815
Ship	State	Description
Societé	United States	The ship was driven ashore and wrecked on North Ronaldsay, Orkney Islands. She was on a voyager from Gothenburg, Sweden to New York.
Watts	United Kingdom	The brig was wrecked on the Florida Reef. She was on a voyage from Montego Bay, Jamaica, to New York.

=== 22 September ===
List of shipwrecks: 22 September 1815
Ship	State	Description
Peace and Plenty	United States	The ship was wrecked in a hurricane in the Turks Islands with the loss of 22 lives.

=== 23 September ===
List of shipwrecks: 23 September 1815
Ship	State	Description
Ariadne	United Kingdom	The ship was lost at Newport, Rhode Island, United States. She was on a voyage from Newport to Bristol, Gloucestershire.
Augusta	United Kingdom	The ship was wrecked at New Bedford, Massachusetts, United States. She was on a voyage from Virginia, United States to London.
Charity	Sweden	The full-rigged ship was driven ashore at Boston, Massachusetts, United States.
Friendship	United Kingdom	The brig was driven ashore on Staten Island, New York, United States. She was on a voyage from Halifax, Nova Scotia, British North America to Jamaica. She was later refloated and taken in to New York, where she arrived on 29 September.
Margaret Ann	United Kingdom	The ship was severely damaged in a gale at Boston, Massachusetts.
Matchless	United Kingdom	The ship sank at Boston, Massachusetts.
Orion	United States	The ship was wrecked at Stag Harbour, Newfoundland, British North America. Her crew were rescued. She was on a voyage from Saint Petersburg, Russia to Providence, Rhode Island, United States.
Redligheten	Sweden	The full-rigged ship was driven ashore at Boston, Massachusetts.
Stanton	United Kingdom	The ship was severely damaged in a gale at Boston, Massachusetts.

=== 24 September ===
List of shipwrecks: 24 September 1815
Ship	State	Description
Adventure	United Kingdom	The ship was lost at Fogo, Newfoundland, British North America with the loss of all hands. She was on a voyage from Labrador to Newfoundland.

=== 25 September ===
List of shipwrecks: 25 September 1815
Ship	State	Description
Chester	United Kingdom	The ship foundered in the Irish Sea off Castletown, Isle of Man. Her crew were rescued. She was on a voyage from Newry, County Down to Liverpool, Lancashire.
Elizabeth	United Kingdom	The ship foundered in the Irish Sea off Kirkcudbright. She was on a voyage from Liverpool to Portrush, County Antrim.
Siro	United States	The ship was wrecked on the Carolina coast. She was on a voyage from Portland, Oregon, to St. Jago de Cuba, Cuba.
Union	United Kingdom	The ship ran aground at South Shields, County Durham. She was refloated.
Vittoria	Russia	The brig was destroyed by fire at Ramsgate, Kent, United Kingdom. She was on a voyage from Arkhangelsk to Havre de Grâce, Seine-Inférieure, France.
Unnamed	Flag unknown	The barque foundered off the Isle of Man with the loss of all hands.
Unnamed	United Kingdom	The sloop foundered off the Isle of Man with the loss of all hands.

=== 26 September ===
List of shipwrecks: 26 September 1815
Ship	State	Description
Esperance	Netherlands	The ship foundered off Ouessant, Finistère. Her crew were rescued. She was on a voyage from Antwerp to Barcelona, Spain.
Industry	United Kingdom	The ship was wrecked on the Black Middings, in the North Sea off South Shields, County Durham. The South Shields Lifeboat rescued her crew.
Parallel Motion	United Kingdom	The Humber Keel was driven ashore at South Shields. She was refloated.
Victoria	Russia	The brig was damaged by fire at Ramsgate, Kent, United Kingdom.
Unnamed	United Kingdom	The sloop was driven ashore at South Shields. She was refloated.
Unnamed	United Kingdom	The coble capsized off Flamborough Head, Yorkshire with the loss of two of her three crew. The survivor was rescued by Betsey (United Kingdom).
Unnamed	Kingdom of Naples	The xebec was wrecked at Viareggio, Grand Duchy of Tuscany with the loss of seven lives.

=== 27 September ===
List of shipwrecks: 27 September 1815
Ship	State	Description
Aasgardstrand	Denmark	The ship was wrecked near "North Feroe". Her crew were rescued. She was on a voyage from Christiana to Dublin, United Kingdom.
Borsenhalle	Hamburg	The ship was driven ashore at Schaarhorn. She was on a voyage from Bordeaux, Gironde, France to Hamburg. Borsenhalle was later refloated.
Elizabeth	United Kingdom	The ship foundered in the English Channel off Bognor, Sussex with the loss of all three crew.
Elizabeth	United Kingdom	The ship ran aground on the Burbo Bank, in Liverpool Bay. She was on a voyage from Demerara to Liverpool, Lancashire. She was refloated.
Emanuel	United Kingdom	The ship sprang a leak in the North Sea (57°26′N 2°50′E) and was abandoned. Her crew were rescued by Álonzo (Flag unknown). Emanuel was on a voyage from Dundee, Perthshire to "Dram", Norway.
Jane	United Kingdom	The ship was wrecked on Nash Point, Glamorgan with the loss of three of her crew. She was on a voyage from Cork to Cardiff, Glamorgan.

=== 28 September ===
List of shipwrecks: 28 September 1815
Ship	State	Description
Fortuna	Stettin	The ship was driven ashore on Götaland, Sweden. She was on a voyage from Saint Petersburg, Russia to Stettin.

=== 29 September ===
List of shipwrecks: 29 September 1815
Ship	State	Description
Sidney Smith	United Kingdom	The ship ran aground on the Boston Knock, in The Wash and foundered. Her crew were rescued.
Unity	United Kingdom	The ship was wrecked on the Fairness Rock, off Margate, Kent. She was on a voyage from Ostend, West Flanders, Netherlands to London.
William	United Kingdom	The ship ran aground on the Maplin Sand, in the North Sea off the coast of Essex. She was on a voyage from Cardiff, Glamorgan to Ipswich, Suffolk. She was refloated and taken in to Harwich, Essex.

=== 30 September ===
List of shipwrecks: 30 September 1815
Ship	State	Description
Avance	Prussia	The ship was wrecked in Chale Bay. She was on a voyage from Drogheda, County Louth, United Kingdom to Königsberg.

=== Unknown date ===
List of shipwrecks: Unknown date in September 1815
Ship	State	Description
Alexander	United Kingdom	The ship was driven ashore and wrecked near Kirkwall, Orkney Islands in late September. She was on a voyage from Virginia, United States to Bremen.
Belle Alliance	Prussia	The ship was lost near Swinemünde. She was on a voyage from Königsburg to London, United Kingdom.
Edward and Ann	United States	The ship departed from New Orleans, Louisiana, for Jamaica before 25 September. No further trace, presumed foundered with the loss of all hands.
Eliza	United Kingdom	The ship departed from Liverpool, Lancashire for Quebec City, Lower Canada, British North America. No further trace, presumed foundered in the Atlantic Ocean with the loss of all hands.
Fanny	United Kingdom	The ship struck a rock off Jethou, Channel Islands and foundered. She was on a voyage from Sunderland, County Durham to Guernsey, Channel Islands.
Flora	United Kingdom	The ship was driven ashore and wrecked on Abruka, Russia. She was on a voyage from Riga, Russia to Hull, Yorkshire, United Kingdom.
George Washington	United States	The ship was wrecked on the coast of Hispaniola. She was on a voyage from Saint Pierre to Castine, Maine.
Gute Speculant	Stettin	The ship struck a sunken wreck in the English Channel and was consequently beached at Hythe, Kent, United Kingdom. Following temporary repairs, she put into Dover, Kent. Gute Speculant was on a voyage from Stettin to Plymouth, Devon, United Kingdom.
Mary Ann	United Kingdom	The ship was destroyed by fire in the North Sea off the coast of West Flanders, Netherlands with the loss of all but two of her crew.
Model	United Kingdom	The ship was wrecked at Saint Barthélemy.
Nancy	United Kingdom	The ship was wrecked at Jeddore, Nova Scotia, British North America. She was on a voyage from Halifax, Nova Scotia, to St. John's, Newfoundland, British North America.
Norjaden	Russia	The ship was driven ashore and wrecked on Saaremaa in late September. She was on a voyage from Riga to Bordeaux, Gironde, France.
Nymph	United Kingdom	The ship sprang a leak in the North Sea (54°38′N 6°22′E) and was abandoned. Her crew were rescued by Resolution (Denmark). Nymph was on a voyage from Hull, Yorkshire to Saint Petersburg, Russia.
Providentia	Sweden	The brig was discovered abandoned in the Atlantic Ocean (44°43′N 62°00′W) on 22 September by Royal Edward (United Kingdom). She was taken in but cast adrift on 30 September. Providentia was on a voyage from Norfolk, Virginia, United States, to Gothenburg.
Ridley	United Kingdom	The ship ran aground on the Dragoe Reef, in the Baltic Sea in late September. She was on a voyage from Saint Petersburg to London. She was refloated and resumed her voyage.
Tiber	Portugal	The ship foundered in the Atlantic Ocean before 20 October. Eleven crew members survived. She was on a voyage from St. Ubes to New York, United States.
Unamed	Prussia	The ship was wrecked. There was at least one survivor.

== October ==
=== 1 October ===
List of shipwrecks: 1 October 1815
Ship	State	Description
Adriana	United States	The ship was abandoned in the North Sea. Her crew were rescued by St. Patrick (United Kingdom). Adriana was on a voyage from Saint Petersburg, Russia to Baltimore, Maryland.
Halcyon	United States	The ship foundered in the Atlantic Ocean. Her crew survived. She was on a voyage from Savannah, Georgia, to Liverpool, Lancashire, United Kingdom.

=== 2 October ===
List of shipwrecks: 2 October 1815
Ship	State	Description
Avance	Prussia	The galiot was wrecked in Chale Bay. She was on a voyage from Drogheda, County Louth, United Kingdom to Königsberg.
Charlotte	United States	The ship was discovered 400 nautical miles (740 km) off Barbados with only one crew member aboard. She was on a voyage from Boston Massachusetts to Cayenne, French Guiana.

=== 3 October ===
List of shipwrecks: 3 October 1815
Ship	State	Description
Concordia	United Kingdom	The ship ran aground on the Gabbard Sand, in the North Sea off the coast of Essex. She was on a voyage from Saint Petersburg, Russia to Plymouth, Devon. She was refloated and taken in to Harwich, Essex.
Hunter	United States	The ship sprang a leak and was abandoned in the Atlantic Ocean (32°34′N 71°36′W. She was on a voyage from New York to Curaçao.
Speculator	United Kingdom	The ship sank at Ramsgate, Kent, having previously struck the Corton Sand, in the North Sea off the coast of Suffolk. She was on a voyage from Saint Petersburg to Livorno, Grand Duchy of Tuscany. Speculator was subsequently refloated.
Superior	United States	The ship was lost near Cape Hatteras, North Carolina. Her crew were rescued. She was on a voyage from Martinique to Philadelphia, Pennsylvania.

=== 4 October ===
List of shipwrecks: 4 October 1815
Ship	State	Description
Friendship	United Kingdom	The ship was abandoned in the Atlantic Ocean (50°30′N 14°00′W). Her crew were rescued on 10 October by Sachem (United States). She was on a voyage from Miramichi Bay to Bideford, Devon.
Hannah	United Kingdom	The ship was driven ashore at Deerness, Orkney Islands. She was on a voyage from Riga, Russia to Dublin.
Speedy	United Kingdom	The ship ran aground at Oporto, Portugal. She was on a voyage from Oporto to Liverpool, Lancashire. She was refloated and resumed her voyage, but put in to A Coruña, Spain on 9 October due to losing her rudder.

=== 5 October ===
List of shipwrecks: 5 October 1815
Ship	State	Description
Fame	United Kingdom	The ship was driven ashore in the Sound of Islay. she was on a voyage from Arkhangelsk, Russia to Liverpool, Lancashire.
Hibernia	United Kingdom	The ship was driven ashore at Crosby, Lancashire. She was on a voyage from Halifax, Nova Scotia, British North America to Liverpool. She was refloated and taken in to Liverpool.
Huna	United Kingdom	The ferry was lost in the Pentland Firth with the loss of six lives.
Rowcliffe	United Kingdom	The ship struck the Stoney Binks, in the North Sea with the loss of two of her crew. The survivors abandoned her. She was on a voyage from British Honduras to Hull, Yorkshire. Rowcliffe was later brought in to the Humber.
Unnamed	United Kingdom	The ship was wrecked near Clyth, Caithness with the loss of all three crew.
Unnamed	United Kingdom	The ship was wrecked near Wick, Caithness. Her crew were rescued.

=== 8 October ===
List of shipwrecks: 8 October 1815
Ship	State	Description
Phœnix	(United States) Missouri Territory	The ship departed from New Providence, Bahamas for Jamaica. No further trace, presumed foundered with the loss of all hands.

=== 9 October ===
List of shipwrecks: 9 October 1815
Ship	State	Description
Henrietta	United Kingdom	The ship sank at Havre de Grâce, Seine-Inférieure, France.

=== 10 October ===
List of shipwrecks: 10 October 1815
Ship	State	Description
Allinson	United Kingdom	The ship was wrecked at Dublin. The Dublin Lifeboat rescued her crew. She was on a voyage from Whitehaven, Cumberland to Dublin.
Estafette	Stettin	The ship ran aground and sprang a leak. She was on a voyage from Stettin to Málaga, Spain. She put in to Terschelling, Friesland, Netherlands, with the intention of going to Harlingen, Friesland for repairs.
Mary and Nancy	United Kingdom	The ship foundered in the English Channel off Hartland Point, Devon with the loss of a crew member. She was on a voyage from Wexford to London.

=== 13 October ===
List of shipwrecks: 13 October 1815
Ship	State	Description
Helen	United Kingdom	The ship was wrecked near Peterhead, Aberdeenshire. Her crew were rescued. She was on a voyage from Newcastle upon Tyne, Northumberland to Bristol, Gloucestershire, United Kingdom.

=== 14 October ===
List of shipwrecks: 14 October 1815
Ship	State	Description
Nostra Señora del Carmen	Spain	The ship was abandoned in the Atlantic Ocean (approximately 35°N 45°W). Her crew were rescued by Ocean (United States). Nostra Señora del Carmen was on a voyage from "La Guyra" to Cádiz.

=== 15 October ===
List of shipwrecks: 15 October 1815
Ship	State	Description
Eliza Ann	United Kingdom	The ship was driven ashore and wrecked at Youghal, County Cork. She was on a voyage from Cork to Lisbon, Portugal.
Fame	United Kingdom	The ship was driven ashore on Jura. She was on a voyage from Arkhangelsk, Russia to Liverpool, Lancashire. She was later refloated.

=== 16 October ===
List of shipwrecks: 16 October 1815
Ship	State	Description
Ann	United Kingdom	The ship ran aground at Needham's Point, Barbados and was damaged. She was on a voyage from Liverpool, Nova Scotia, British North America to Barbados. She completed her voyage.
Margaret	United Kingdom	The ship foundered in the Atlantic Ocean. Her crew were rescued. She was on a voyage from Liverpool, Lancashire to Charleston, South Carolina, United States.
Neptune	United Kingdom	The schooner foundered in the Atlantic Ocean. Her crew were rescued by Argus (United Kingdom). She was on a voyage from Liverpool to St. John's, Newfoundland, British North America.

=== 17 October ===
List of shipwrecks: 17 October 1815
Ship	State	Description
Abraham Newland	United Kingdom	The full-rigged ship was driven ashore and wrecked in a hurricane at Port Antonia, Jamaica.
Alert	United Kingdom	The full-rigged ship was driven ashore in a hurricane at Annotto Bay, Jamaica.
Aurora	United Kingdom	The sloop was driven ashore and wrecked in a hurricane at Port Maria, Jamaica.
Bayley	United Kingdom	The full-rigged ship was driven ashore in a hurricane at Annotto Bay.
Concord	(United Kingdom of Great Britain and Ireland) Jamaica	The schooner was driven ashore and wrecked in a hurricane at Port Antonia with the loss of a crew member.
Dart	United Kingdom	The sloop was driven ashore and wrecked in a hurricane at Morant Bay, Jamaica. She was on a voyage from Kingston to St. Jago de Cuba, Cuba.
Earl of Lonsdale	United Kingdom	The full-rigged ship was driven ashore in a hurricane at Annotto Bay.
Eliza Ann	United Kingdom	The schooner was driven ashore in a hurricane at Oracabessa, Jamaica.
Enterprise	United Kingdom	The sloop was driven ashore and wrecked in a hurricane at Annotto Bay with the loss of a crew member.
Enterprize	United States	The ship sprang a leak and was beached in the Belfast Lough. She was on a voyage from Belfast, County Antrim, United Kingdom to Liverpool, Lancashire, United Kingdom.
Enterprize	United Kingdom	The sloop was wrecked in a hurricane at Annotto Bay with the loss of a crew member.
Fife	United Kingdom	The full-rigged ship was driven ashore and wrecked in a hurricane at Port Maria.
Foyle	United Kingdom	The full-rigged ship was driven ashore and wrecked in a hurricane at Port Antonia with the loss of thirteen of her sixteen crew. She was on a voyage from New York, United States to Kingston.
Fox	United Kingdom	The full-rigged ship was driven ashore and wrecked in a hurricane at Port Antonia.
Hercules	United Kingdom	The full-rigged ship was driven ashore in a hurricane at Oracabessa.
Il Rio Bueno	Spain	The ship was driven ashore in a hurricane at Jamaica
Janet	United Kingdom	The ship was driven ashore in a hurricane at Annotto Bay.
Lady Banks	United Kingdom	The ship was driven ashore in a hurricane at Port Maria.
Lady Caroline	United Kingdom	The sloop was driven ashore in a hurricane at Jamaica.
Margaretta Bourentica	France	The ship ran aground on the Barber Sand, in the North Sea off the coast of Norfolk, United Kingdom. She was on a voyage from a Baltic port to Bordeaux, Gironde. She was refloated and taken in to Great Yarmouth, Norfolk in a waterlogged condition.
Mary	(United Kingdom of Great Britain and Ireland) Jamaica	The schooner was driven ashore and wrecked in a hurricane at Orange Bay.
Mary Ann	United Kingdom	The ship was driven ashore in a hurricane at Kingston. She was later refloated.
Middlesex	United Kingdom	The sloop was driven ashore in a hurricane at Annotto Bay.
Nancy	United Kingdom	The sloop was driven ashore and wrecked in a hurricane at Port Maria.
Parrsborough	United Kingdom	The brig was driven ashore in a hurricane at Annotto Bay.
Sally	United Kingdom	The sloop was driven ashore in a hurricane at Annotto Bay.
Solo	Spain	The brig was driven ashore and wrecked in a hurricane at Port Antonia with the loss of eight of her nine crew.
Two Friends	United Kingdom	The schooner was driven ashore in a hurricane at Port Antonia.
William	United Kingdom	The sloop was driven ashore and wrecked in a hurricane at Port Maria.
William	United Kingdom	The full-rigged ship was driven ashore in a hurricane at Anotta Bay.
William and Nancy	United Kingdom	The sloop was driven ashore and wrecked in a hurricane at Port Maria.
Unnamed	Flag unknown	The sloop was driven ashore in a hurricane at Port Antonia.
Unnamed	Spain	The brig was driven ashore in a hurricane at Port Antonia.
Two unnamed vessels	Flags unknown	A brig and a schooner were driven ashore in a hurricane at Dry Harbour.

=== 18 October ===
List of shipwrecks: 18 October 1815
Ship	State	Description
Betsey	United Kingdom	The ship foundered in the Irish Sea off Saundersfoot, Pembrokeshire with the loss of two lives. She was on a voyage from Tenby, Pembrokeshire to Bristol, Gloucestershire.
Hercules	United Kingdom	The ship was driven ashore and wrecked in a hurricane at Port Maria, Jamaica, with the loss of several lives. She was on a voyage from Kingston, Jamaica to Savannah, Georgia.
Jong Pieter	Netherlands	The galiot sprang a leak and foundered in the Atlantic Ocean off Ouessant, Finistère, France with the loss of a crew member. She was on a voyage from Vlissingen, Zeeland to Bordeaux, Gironde, France.
Rapid	Spain	The ship was wrecked off the Bahamas with the loss of sixteen of her 38 crew. Survivors were rescued by Phantom (Flag unknown). Rapid was on a voyage from Cádiz to Havana, Cuba.
Renown	United Kingdom	The brig was severely damaged by fire at South Shields, County Durham.
Udny	United Kingdom	The schooner foundered off the Isle of May. Her crew were rescued. She was on a voyage from Newburgh, Fife to Sunderland, County Durham.

=== 19 October ===
List of shipwrecks: 19 October 1815
Ship	State	Description
Anthony	United Kingdom	The sloop capsized in a hurricane off the coast of Jamaica with the loss of all hands. She was on a voyage from Kingston to Savanna-la-Mar.
Arcturus	United Kingdom	The ship ran aground on the Long Sand, in the North Sea off the coast of Essex, and sank. She was on a voyage from Portsmouth, Hampshire to Whitby, Yorkshire.
Caronne	United Kingdom	The sloop was driven ashore in a hurricane at Rio Bueno, Jamaica.
Columbiana	United Kingdom	The schooner was driven ashore in a hurricane at St. Ann's Bay, Jamaica.
Delhi	British East India Company	The East Indiaman was driven ashore and wrecked near Marazion, Cornwall. She was on a voyage from Batavia, Netherlands East Indies to London.
Flora	France	The ship was wrecked in Mount's Bay. Her crew were rescued. She was on a voyage from Bordeaux, Gironde to Riga, Russia.
Georgiana	United Kingdom	The brigantine was driven ashore in a hurricane at Discovery Bay, Jamaica. She was on a voyage from Port Royal, Jamaica to Falmouth, Cornwall.
Mary	United Kingdom	The brig was driven ashore in a hurricane at Kingston, Jamaica.
Mary & Nancy	United Kingdom	The ship was wrecked off Hartland Point, Devon with the loss of a crew member. She was on a voyage from Wexford to Plymouth, Devon and London.
Mary Ann	United Kingdom	The full-rigged ship was driven ashore in The Narrows, Jamaica.
Patent	United States	The ship was driven ashore and wrecked in Frankfort Bay, Jamaica.
Planet	United Kingdom	The ship was wrecked in Frankfort Bay, Jamaica. She was on a voyage from Wilmington, Delaware, United States to Jamaica.
Rapid	United Kingdom	The ship was wrecked off the east coast of Jamaica. She was on a voyage from Cádiz, Spain to Havana, Cuba.
Resolution	United Kingdom	The brigantine was driven ashore in The Narrows, Jamaica.
Susan	United Kingdom	The full-rigged ship was driven ashore on the Palisadoes, Jamaica.
William	United Kingdom	The ship was driven ashore and wrecked in a hurricane at Annotto Bay, Jamaica. Her crew were rescued.

=== 20 October ===
List of shipwrecks: 20 October 1815
Ship	State	Description
John	United Kingdom	The ship was wrecked at Winterton-on-Sea, Norfolk. Her crew were rescued. She was on a voyage from Newcastle upon Tyne, Northumberland to London.
Horizon	United States	The ship departed from Helsingør, Denmark for Boston, Massachusetts. No further trace, presumed foundered with the loss of all hands.
St. Thomas	United Kingdom	The ship departed from Lanzarote, Canary Islands for London. No further trace, presumed foundered with the loss of all hands.

=== 21 October ===
List of shipwrecks: 21 October 1815
Ship	State	Description
Brothers	United Kingdom	The ship ran aground on the West Rocks, in the North Sea off the coast of Essex. She was on a voyage from South Shields, County Durham to London. She was refloated and taken in to Harwich, Essex.
Elizabeth	(United Kingdom of Great Britain and Ireland) Bahamas	The sloop was driven ashore at Plumb Point, Jamaica. She was refloated on 25 October and taken in to Port Royal, Jamaica.
General Kempt	United Kingdom	The ship was driven ashore at Liverpool, Lancashire. She was on a voyage from Miramichi, New Brunswick, British North America to Liverpool. General Kempt was later refloated and taken in to Liverpool.
Vermont	United States	The steamboat foundered in Lake Champlain. She was on a voyage from St. John's, Lower Canada, British North America to White Hall, New York.

=== 22 October ===
List of shipwrecks: 22 October 1815
Ship	State	Description
Sir John Borlase Warren	United Kingdom	The ship was abandoned in the Atlantic Ocean. She was on a voyage from Savannah, Georgia, United States to Barbados.

=== 23 October ===
List of shipwrecks: 23 October 1815
Ship	State	Description
Friendship	United Kingdom	The brig was driven ashore on Staten Island, New York. She was on a voyage from Halifax, Nova Scotia, British North America to Jamaica.
Indefatigable	United Kingdom	The ship was destroyed by fire at Batavia, Netherlands East Indies.
Mary	United Kingdom	The ship was driven ashore in Dundrum Bay. She was on a voyage from Sicily to Belfast, County Antrim. She was refloated on 30 October and put into Killough, County Antrim.
Matchless	United Kingdom	The schooner sank at Boston.
Peace	United Kingdom	The ship was driven ashore near Wexford. She was on a voyage from the Isles of Scilly to Waterford.
Susan	United Kingdom	The ship was driven ashore at Littlehampton, Sussex. She was on a voyage from Liverpool, Lancashire to London. Susan floated off on 29 October but was consequently beached. She was refloated in early November and taken into Littlehampton.

=== 24 October ===
List of shipwrecks: 24 October 1815
Ship	State	Description
Fortuna	United Kingdom	The ship sank at Great Yarmouth, Norfolk. She was on a voyage from Glasgow, Renfrewshire to London.
Neptune	United Kingdom	The schooner foundered in the Atlantic Ocean. Her crew were rescued by Agnes (United Kingdom). She was on a voyage from Liverpool, Lancashire to St. John's, Newfoundland, British North America.

=== 25 October ===
List of shipwrecks: 25 October 1815
Ship	State	Description
James and Ann	United Kingdom	The ship was abandoned in The Wash off Boston, Lincolnshire. She was on a voyage from London to Wakefield, Yorkshire. She was discovered that day by Fortuna (United Kingdom) and taken in to the Humber.
Jonge Wilhelm	Netherlands	The ship was driven ashore at Strömstad, Sweden. She was on a voyage from Amsterdam, North Holland to Königsberg, Prussia.
Maria Vincente	France	The ship was driven ashore at Porthleven, Cornwall, United Kingdom. She was on a voyage from Bordeaux, Gironde to Rouen, Seine-Inférieure.

=== 26 October ===
List of shipwrecks: 26 October 1815
Ship	State	Description
Anthorn	United Kingdom	The ship was driven ashore in the Gulf of St Lawrence. She was on a voyage from Liverpool, Lancashire to Quebec, Lower Canada, British North America.
Endeavour	United Kingdom	The ship departed from Cork for Southampton, Hampshire. No further trace, presumed foundered with the loss of all hands.
Friends	United Kingdom	The ship was wrecked on the Scroby Sands, Norfolk.
Mary	United Kingdom	The ship was driven ashore on the Laugharne Sands, Carmarthenshire. She was on a voyage from Seville, Spain to Bristol, Gloucestershire.

=== 27 October ===
List of shipwrecks: 27 October 1815
Ship	State	Description
Alert	United Kingdom	The brig was driven ashore at Arbroath, Forfarshire. She was on a voyage from Hamburg to Aberdeen. Alert was refloated on 30 October and taken into Arbroath.
Esperanza	(United Kingdom of Great Britain and Ireland) Jamaica	The schooner was driven ashore in a hurricane at Kingston, Jamaica. She was later refloated.
Flora	Sweden	The ship was driven ashore on Götaland and was wrecked. She was on a voyage from Gamla Carleby to London, United Kingdom.
Friends	United Kingdom	The ship ran aground on the Scroby Sands, Norfolk and sank.
George	United Kingdom	The ship was wrecked near Wexford.
John	(United Kingdom of Great Britain and Ireland) Jamaica	The sloop was driven ashore and wrecked in a hurricane at Kingston.
London	United Kingdom	The sloop was driven ashore in a hurricane at Kingston. She was later refloated.
Patty	(United Kingdom of Great Britain and Ireland) Jamaica	The schooner was driven ashore in a hurricane at Kingston. She was later refloated.

=== 28 October ===
List of shipwrecks: 28 October 1815
Ship	State	Description
Barbara	France	The ship foundered in the English Channel off Saint-Valery-sur-Somme, Somme. She was on a voyage from Bordeaux, Gironde, France to Memel, Prussia.
Dispatch	United Kingdom	The ship foundered in the Atlantic Ocean off Cape St. Vincent, Portugal. A Danish brig rescued her crew. She was on a voyage from Cork to Tenerife, Canary Islands, Spain.
Fame	United Kingdom	The ship foundered in the Irish Sea off Balbriggan, County Dublin with the loss of all hands. She was on a voyage from Grangemouth, Stirlingshire to Dublin.
Favourite	United Kingdom	The ship ran aground on the Herd Sand, in the North Sea off the coast of County Durham. Her crew were rescued by a lifeboat. She was on a voyage from Pugwash, Nova Scotia, British North America to Newcastle upon Tyne, Northumberland. she was refloated on 3 November and taken in to South Shields, County Durham.
Frederick	France	The ship was driven ashore and severely damaged. She was on a voyage from Rouen, Seine-Inférieure to Bordeaux, Gironde. She was refloated and put back to Rouen.
James	United Kingdom	The ship ran aground on the Gunfleet Sand, in the North Sea off the coast of Suffolk. She was on a voyage from Arkhangelsk, Russia to London. She was refloated with the assistance of two smacks and taken in to the River Colne.
Jane	United Kingdom	The ship foundered in the Irish Sea off Maryport, Cumberland with the loss of all hands.
London	United Kingdom	The ship ran agroud on the West Tongue Sand, off Margate, Kent. She was on a voyage from London to Tobago. She was refloated and resumed her voyage.
Mary	United Kingdom	The ship ran argound in the River Shannon. She was on a voyage from Limerick to London.
McDowell	United Kingdom	The ship was wrecked on the Kettlebottom Rock, off Barbados. Her crew were rescued.
Salvadore	Kingdom of Sicily	The ship ran aground on the Goodwin Sands, Kent, United Kingdom. She was refloated and beached at Deal, Kent, where she was wrecked. Salvadore was on a voyage from London to Palermo.
Vidette	United Kingdom	The ship was wrecked on Long Island, New York, United States, with the loss of three of her crew.
Young James	United Kingdom	The ship foundered in the Irish Sea off Balbriggan with the loss of all hands. She was on a voyage from Liverpool, Lancashire to Dublin.
Unnamed	Flag unknown	The brig was wrecked on the Knowle Sand, in the North Sea off the coast of Essex.

=== 29 October ===
List of shipwrecks: 29 October 1815
Ship	State	Description
Ardent	United Kingdom	The ship was driven ashore near "Annette", Isles of Scilly, and was abandoned by her crew. Having been plundered of her cargo of butter by the local inhabitants, she was refloated on 31 October. Ardent was on a voyage from Waterford to London.
Betsey and Janet	United Kingdom	The ship was driven ashore and wrecked at North Somercotes, Lincolnshire with the loss of all hands. She was on a voyage from Grangemouth, Stirlingshire to London.
Ceres	United Kingdom	The ship was wrecked on the Maplin Sands, in the North Sea off the coast of Essex. Her crew were rescued. She was on a voyage from South Shields, County Durham to London. She was refloated the next day and taken in to Harwich, Essex in a leaky condition.
Elizabeth	United Kingdom	The ship was driven ashore near St Helen's, Isles of Scilly. She was on a voyage from Havre de Grâce, Seine-Inférieure, France to Liverpool, Lancashire. Elizabeth was later refloated and taken in to St Mary's, Isles of Scilly for examination.
Friends	United Kingdom	The ship foundered in the North Sea off Great Yarmouth, Norfolk. Her crew were rescued.
Johan Philip	Netherlands	The ship was driven ashore near Goree, South Holland. She was on a voyage from Riga, Russia to Rotterdam, South Holland.
John	United Kingdom	The ship was driven ashore and wrecked at Winterton-on-Sea, Norfolk. Her crew were rescued. She was on a voyage from Newcastle upon Tyne, Northumberland to London.
Mary	United Kingdom	The ship ran aground in the River Shannon. She was on a voyage from Limerick to London.
Mercurius	Denmark	The ship was wrecked on the Goodwin Sands, Kent, United Kingdom with the loss of all hands. She was on a voyage from Copenhagen to Saint Croix, Virgin Islands.
Ouwenmaght	Netherlands	The hoy foundered in the North Sea off Harwich, Essex. She was on a voyage from Amsterdam, North Holland to London.
Sir William Curtis	United Kingdom	The ship was driven ashore at Ostend, West Flanders, Netherlands with the loss of three lives.
St. Francis	France	The ship foundered in the English Channel.
Thais	United Kingdom	The ship was driven ashore at St. Agnes, Cornwall. She was on a voyage from Swansea, Glamorgan to Penzance, Cornwall.
Thames	United Kingdom	The ship was wrecked on the Maplin Sands. Her crew were rescued.
Thomas	United Kingdom	The ship was wrecked on the Maplin Sands. Her crew were rescued. She was on a voyage from South Shields to London.

=== 30 October ===
List of shipwrecks: 30 October 1815
Ship	State	Description
Anastasia	France	The ship was lost near Morlaix, Finistère with the loss of seven lives. She was on a voyage from Rotterdam, South Holland, Netherlands to the Île de Ré, Charente-Inférieure.
Antigonus	Netherlands	The brig ran aground on the Horse Sand, in the North Sea and sank. The Herne Bay Lifeboat rescued her crew. She was on a voyage from Sint Maarten to Ostend, West Flanders.
Ebenezer	United Kingdom	The ship was driven ashore in Studland Bay. she was on a voyage from Newcastle upon Tyne, Northumberland to Poole, Dorset. Ebenezer was later refloated.
Flora	United Kingdom	The ship was driven ashore. She was on a voyage from Sunderland, County Durham to London. She was refloated and taken in to Harwich, Essex in a leaky condition.
Lord Nelson	United Kingdom	The ship was lost off Sanlúcar de Barrameda, Spain. Her crew were rescued. She was on a voyage from London to Seville, Spain.
Symmetry	United Kingdom	The ship ran aground at Margate, Kent. She was on a voyage from Sunderland, County Durham to Rotterdam, South Holland, Netherlands.
Unnamed	Netherlands	The ship was driven ashore at Winterton-on-Sea, Norfolk, United Kingdom.
Unnamed'	United Kingdom	The collier was lost on the Scroby Sands, Norfolk.

=== 31 October ===
List of shipwrecks: 31 October 1815
Ship	State	Description
Catherina Anna	Hamburg	The ship was abandoned in the Atlantic Ocean (approximately 40°N 53°W). Her crew were rescued by Marcus Hill (United States). She was on a voyage from Hamburg to New York, United States.
Jonge Henry	Netherlands	The ship was lost near Barfleur, Manche, France. Her crew were rescued. She was on a voyage from Amsterdam, North Holland to Bordeaux, Gironde, France.
Sterling	United Kingdom	The ship sank in Mullins Inlet, South Carolina, United States. Her crew were rescued. She was on a voyage from Liverpool, Lancashire to Savannah, Georgia, United States.

=== Unknown date ===
List of shipwrecks: Unknown date in October 1815
Ship	State	Description
Adventure	United Kingdom	The sloop was driven ashore on one of the Goat Islands, Jamaica.
Alexander Buchanan	United Kingdom	The ship was driven ashore on the coast of Honduras. She was on a voyage from Honduras to Cork. She was refloated and sailed on 14 October.
Betsy	New South Wales	The vessel was involved in whaling off New Zealand's Auckland Islands. An outbreak of scurvy on board killed many of the crew and laid low most of the remainder, and in attempts to return to Port Jackson, heavy weather forced them close to the New Zealand mainland. The ship was abandoned by the surviving crew (six of an original 33 complement). These six men made it to shore on the Northland coast; the ship itself was wrecked on the same coast.
Blossom	United Kingdom	The ship was wrecked on Scroby Sands, Norfolk. Her crew were rescued. She was on a voyage from Newcastle upon Tyne, Northumberland to London.
Caledonia	United Kingdom	The ship foundered in the China Sea.
Carolina Sophia	Russia	The ship ran aground at Arkhangelsk before 27 October. She was refloated and put back to Arkhangelsk.
Castletown	(United Kingdom of Great Britain and Ireland) Isle of Man	The ship was wrecked on Langness Point whilst on a voyage from Castletown, Isle of Man to Liverpool, Lancashire. Her crew were rescued.
Cherub	United Kingdom	The ship ran aground on a rock in Dundrum Bay. She was on a voyage from Liverpool to Belfast, County Antrim, and Jamaica. Cherub was later refloated and put into Killough, County Down.
De Heyder	Netherlands	The ship ran aground off the coast of Zeeland. She was on a voyage from Savannah, Georgia to a Dutch port. She was refloated and put in to "Ter Vere".
Eva Sophia	Lübeck	The ship was driven ashore on Götaland, Sweden. She was on a voyage from Gamla Carleby, Sweden to London.
Friendship	United Kingdom	The brig sprang a leak and was abandoned in the Atlantic Ocean before 11 October.
Intrepid	United States	The ship was wrecked on Heneaga. Her crew were rescued. She was on a voyage from Jamaica to Baltimore, Maryland.
John William	United Kingdom	The schooner was driven ashore in the Salt River, Jamaica.
Jonathan	United States	The ship was abandoned at sea. She was on a voyage from Elizabeth City, New Jersey, to Saint Barthélemy.
Jong Jacob	France	The ship foundered in the Atlantic Ocean off Ouessant. She was on a voyage from Ostend to Bordeaux.
Marmion	United Kingdom	The ship foundered off Campbeltown, Argyllshire. Her crew were rescued.
Mornington	British East India Company	The East Indiaman was destroyed by fire in the Bay of Bengal.
Neutralité	Netherlands	The ship was wrecked near Egmond aan Zee, North Holland. She was on a voyage from Stockholm, Sweden to Rotterdam, South Holland.
Nordstern	Hamburg	The ship ran aground in the Elbe. She was on a voyage from Leith, Lothian, United Kingdom to Hamburg. She was refloated with assistance.
Sincerity	United Kingdom	The ship was severely damaged at St. Ives, Cornwall after 5 October. She was on a voyage from Liverpool to Rouen, Seine-Inférieure, France.
Speculation	United Kingdom	The ship was driven ashore in the Firth of Forth and severely damaged. She was on a voyage from Oporto, Portugal to Dumfries. Speculation was later refloated.
Sybil	United Kingdom	The ship was abandoned in the Atlantic Ocean (approximately 35°N 68°W). Her crew were rescued by Margaret (United Kingdom). Sybil was on a voyage from New Orleans, Louisiana, to Liverpool. She was boarded by part of the crew of Margaret; they took her in to Charlestown, South Carolina on 27 October.
Union	Spain	The ship was driven ashore and sank near New London, Connecticut, United States. She was on a voyage from Palermo, Sicily to New York, United States.
Victoria	Russia	The brig was destroyed by fire at Ramsgate, Kent, United Kingdom.
Vidette	United Kingdom	The brig was wrecked on Fire Island, New York, United States with the loss of three of her crew.
William	United Kingdom	The ship was driven ashore at Barnstaple, Devon. Her crew were rescued.
Unnamed	United Kingdom	The sloop sank off the coast of Caithness. Her crew survived.
Unnamed	United Kingdom	The schooner was discovered abandoned in the Mediterranean Sea by HMS Undaunted (Royal Navy). She was taken in to Malta on 9 October.

== November ==
=== 1 November ===
List of shipwrecks: 1 November 1815
Ship	State	Description
Duke of Wellington	United Kingdom	The ship struck a rock at Beaumaris, Anglesey and sank. She was on a voyage from Killala, County Mayo to Liverpool, Lancashire.
Friendship	(Russian Empire) Grand Duchy of Finland	The ship ran aground on the Lemon and Ore Sand, in the North Sea and was abandoned by her crew. She was on a voyage from Åbo to Lisbon, Portugal. Friendship later floated off and was driven ashore at Hellevoetsluis, South Holland, Netherlands on 8 November.
Olive Branch	United Kingdom	The brig was damaged by fire at Weymouth, Dorset. she was on a voyage from London to Poole, Dorset.

=== 2 November ===
List of shipwrecks: 2 November 1815
Ship	State	Description
Frederick	United Kingdom	The ship was wrecked on the Goodwin Sands, Kent with the loss of all hands. She was on a voyage from Great Yarmouth, Norfolk to Liverpool, Lancashire.
John and Mary	United Kingdom	The ship struck the Sisters Rocks, off the Norwegian coast, and foundered with the loss of all but two of her crew. She was on a voyage from London to Memel, Prussia.
Mentor	United States	The ship was driven ashore and wrecked on Texel, North Holland, Netherlands.
Two brothers	United Kingdom	The ship was wrecked on the Goodwin Sands, Kent.
Union	United States	The ship was wrecked on the Race Rocks, in the Atlantic Ocean off New London, Connecticut. She was on a voyage from Palermo, Sicily to New York.

=== 3 November ===
List of shipwrecks: 3 November 1815
Ship	State	Description
Anna Maria	United Kingdom	The ship sprang a leak and was abandoned in the Atlantic Ocean. She was on a voyage from Bristol, Gloucestershire to Boston, Massachusetts, United States and Trinidad.
Berenicia	France	The ship foundered off the Île de Ré, Finistère. Her crew were rescued. She was on a voyage from Newcastle upon Tyne, Northumberland, United Kingdom to Bordeaux, Gironde.

=== 4 November ===
List of shipwrecks: 4 November 1815
Ship	State	Description
Duchess of Northumberland	United Kingdom	The ship was driven ashore on Modusko Island, Russia. She was on a voyage from Arkhangelsk, Russia to London.

=== 5 November ===
List of shipwrecks: 5 November 1815
Ship	State	Description
Elizabeth	United Kingdom	The sloop foundered at Falmouth, Cornwall. Her crew were rescued. She was on a voyage from Plymouth, Devon to Falmouth.
Raabel	Prussia	The ship foundered in the Baltic Sea off "Schwatworth". She was on a voyage from Memel to Copenhagen, Denmark.

=== 6 November ===
List of shipwrecks: 6 November 1815
Ship	State	Description
Maria Elizabeth	United Kingdom	The ship ran aground on the Goodwin Sands, Kent. She was on a voyage from Newcastle upon Tyne, Northumberland to São Miguel Island, Azores. She was refloated with assistance and taken in to The Downs.

=== 7 November ===
List of shipwrecks: 7 November 1815
Ship	State	Description
Ariadne	United Kingdom	The ship was wrecked on Lameline Island Newfoundland, British North America. Her crew were rescued. She was on a voyage from Portsmouth, Hampshire to Miramichi, New Brunswick, British North America.
Amgaardstrand, or Assgaardstrand	Norway	The ship was driven ashore at "Ferroe". She was on a voyage from Christiana to Dublin, United Kingdom. She was later refloated and taken into Ferroe.
Dispatch	United Kingdom	The ship foundered off Cape St. Vincent, Portugal. Her crew were rescued by a Danish brig.
Eleonora Charlotta Carolina	Russia	The ship was wrecked on Naissaar.
Franklin	United States	The ship foundered in the Atlantic Ocean. She was on a voyage from Lisbon, Portugal to New York. HMS North Star (Royal Navy) rescued Franklin's crew.
Young William	United Kingdom	The ship was wrecked on Naissaar. Her crew were rescued. She was on a voyage from Saint Petersburg, Russia to London.

=== 8 November ===
List of shipwrecks: 8 November 1815
Ship	State	Description
Atalanta	United States	The brig was wrecked on the Diamond Shoals. Her crew were rescued.
Aurora	Netherlands	The ship was wrecked near Peniche, Portugal. She was on a voyage from Amsterdam, North Holland to Lisbon, Portugal.

=== 10 November ===
List of shipwrecks: 10 November 1815
Ship	State	Description
Lambton	United Kingdom	The ship foundered off Texel, North Holland, Netherlands. She was on a voyage from Gothenburg, Sweden to Topsham, Devon.

=== 11 November ===
List of shipwrecks: 11 November 1815
Ship	State	Description
Waterloo	United Kingdom	The ship foundered in the Irish Sea with the loss of a crew member. She was on a voyage from Whitehaven, Cumberland to Kirkcudbright.

=== 12 November ===
List of shipwrecks: 12 November 1815
Ship	State	Description
Alexander	United States	The ship sprang a leak and was beached at Georgetown, South Carolina. She was on a voyage from Wilmington, Delaware, to Antigua.
Ariadne	United States	The schooner was wrecked on Gardiners Point, New York. She was on a voyage from Martinique to New York City.
Vriendschap	Netherlands	The ship was wrecked on Terschelling, Friesland. She was on a voyage from Amsterdam, North Holland to Stettin.

=== 13 November ===
List of shipwrecks: 13 November 1815
Ship	State	Description
Adelaar	Sweden	The ship was driven ashore on Terschelling, Friesland, Netherlands.
Edward	United Kingdom	The brig was driven ashore and wrecked at Ramsgate, Kent with the loss of her pilot. She was on a voyage from South Shields, County Durham to Plymouth, Devon.
Fanny	United Kingdom	The ship was driven ashore at Liverpool, Lancashire. She was on a voyage from Havana, Cuba to Liverpool. Fanny was later refloated.
Fortitude	United Kingdom	The ship was driven ashore at Aberavon, Glamorgan.
Harmony	United Kingdom	The ship was driven ashore at Liverpool.
Hope	United Kingdom	The ship was driven ashore at Liverpool. She was on a voyage from Liverpool to Philadelphia, Pennsylvania, United States. Hope was later refloated.
Julia	United Kingdom	The ship was driven ashore and wrecked at Brighton, Sussex. She was on a voyage from Bordeaux, Gironde, France to Copenhagen, Denmark.
Old Colony	United States	The ship was driven ashore and sank at Liverpool.
Sampson	United Kingdom	The ship was driven ashore at Liverpool. She was on a voyage from Liverpool to Philadelphia. Sampson was later refloated.
Vulture	United Kingdom	The ship was damaged beyond economic repair in a gale at A Coruña, Spain.

=== 14 November ===
List of shipwrecks: 14 November 1815
Ship	State	Description
Shafto	United Kingdom	The snow ran aground on the Outer Dowsing Sandbank, in the North Sea and sank with the loss of eight of her crew. She was on a voyage from South Shields, County Durham to London.

=== 15 November ===
List of shipwrecks: 16 November 1815
Ship	State	Description
Albion	United Kingdom	The brig was wrecked on Hoy, Orkney Islands.
Mary	United Kingdom	The brig was wrecked at Wells-next-the-Sea, Norfolk with the loss of all hands. She was on a voyage from Hull, Yorkshire to Wells-next-the-Sea.
West Indian	United Kingdom	The ship ran aground on the Pan Sand, off Margate, Kent. She was on a voyage from London to Antigua. She was refloated with assistance and resumed her voyage.

=== 16 November ===
List of shipwrecks: 16 November 1815
Ship	State	Description
Albion	United Kingdom	The brig was wrecked on Hoy, Orkney Islands with the loss of all hands.
Three unnamed vessels	Flags unknown	A full-rigged ship and two brigs were lost at Marstrand, Sweden with the loss of all hands.

=== 17 November ===
List of shipwrecks: 17 November 1815
Ship	State	Description
Thomas	United Kingdom	The sloop was driven ashore at Dunkerque, Nord, France. She was on a voyage from "Wikfield" to Ramsgate, Kent.

=== 19 November ===
List of shipwrecks: 19 November 1815
Ship	State	Description
Eclipse	United Kingdom	The smack struck the Cross Sands, in the North Sea off Great Yarmouth, Norfolk and sank. All on board were rescued by a pilot boat. She was on a voyage from Leith, Lothian to London.
Fielding	United Kingdom	The ship departed from Limerick for Lisbon, Portugal. No further trace, presumed foundered with the loss of all hands.
Lee	United Kingdom	The brig was driven ashore at Point Misco, British North America. She was on a voyage from Chaleur Bay to Liverpool, Lancashire.
Lottery	United Kingdom	The ship was driven ashore at Sag Harbor, New York, United States. Her crew were rescued. She was on a voyage from Liverpool to Saint John, New Brunswick, British North America.

=== 20 November ===
List of shipwrecks: 20 November 1815
Ship	State	Description
Albertina	Netherlands	The ship foundered off "Minserloo". She was on a voyage from "Rothenspiker" to Wormerveer, North Holland.
Angerona	Flag unknown	The ship was driven ashore at Brielle, South Holland, Netherlands.
Commerce	United Kingdom	The ship foundered in the English Channel off La Hogue, Manche, France. She was on a voyage from a Scottish port to Rouen, Seine-Inférieure, France.
Goodintent	United Kingdom	The ship was wrecked at Teignmouth, Devon.
Thomas & Sarah	United Kingdom	The ship was driven ashore at Great Yarmouth, Norfolk.
Xantus	United Kingdom	The ship was wrecked on the Haisborough Sands, Norfolk. She was on a voyage from Newcastle upon Tyne, Northumberland to New York, United States.

=== 21 November ===
List of shipwrecks: 21 November 1815
Ship	State	Description
Admiral Durham	United Kingdom	The ship foundered in the Atlantic Ocean. Her crew were rescued by Swallow (United Kingdom). Admiral Durham was on a voyage from Guadeloupe to London.

=== 23 November ===
List of shipwrecks: 23 November 1815
Ship	State	Description
Five Brothers	United Kingdom	The ship was wrecked near "Pice", Azores. Her crew were rescued. She was on a voyage from San Salvador Island, Bahamas to Liverpool, Lancashire.
Lisbon	Portugal	The packet ship was wrecked on the Scharhörn Sand. Her crew were rescued. She was on a voyage from Lisbon to Hamburg.
New Thompson	United Kingdom	The ship was driven ashore and wrecked in Youghal Bay.
Nostra Señora de los Dolorez	Spain	The ship foundered in the Atlantic Ocean 34 leagues (102 nautical miles (189 km)) west of the Isles of Scilly, United Kingdom. Her crew were rescued. She was on a voyage from Bristol, Gloucestershire, United Kingdom to Rivadeo.

=== 24 November ===
List of shipwrecks: 24 November 1815
Ship	State	Description
Kelton	United Kingdom	The ship was driven ashore in the "Molora". She was on a voyage from Liverpool, Lancashire to Livorno, Grand Duchy of Tuscany. Kelton was later refloated.

=== 25 November ===
List of shipwrecks: 25 November 1815
Ship	State	Description
Adventure	United Kingdom	The ship was wrecked between Cape Lawrence and Cap North, Nova Scotia, British North America. She was on a voyage from London to Miramichi, New Brunswick, British North America.
Oporto	United Kingdom	The packet ship caught fire in the River Thames and was scuttled. She was on a voyage from London to Galway.

=== 26 November ===
List of shipwrecks: 26 November 1815
Ship	State	Description
Dolphin	Sweden	The schooner struck The Manacles and foundered. Her crew were rescued.

=== 27 November ===
List of shipwrecks: 27 November 1815
Ship	State	Description
Dolphin	Sweden	The ketch was wrecked near The Lizard, Cornwall, United Kingdom. Her crew were rescued. She was on a voyage from Falmouth, Cornwall to Málaga, Spain.
Rapid	United States	The ship was driven ashore at Charleston, South Carolina. She was on a voyage from Nantes, Loire-Inférieure, France to Charleston.
St. Patrick	United Kingdom	The ship foundered in the Atlantic Ocean (54°30′N 11°03′W) with the loss of four of her ten crew. Survivors were rescued by Triton (United Kingdom). She was on a voyage from Waterford to Barcelona, Spain.

=== 28 November ===
List of shipwrecks: 28 November 1815
Ship	State	Description
Friends	United Kingdom	The ship was driven ashore 3 Swedish miles (17 nautical miles (32 km)) from Malmö, Sweden. Her crew were rescued. She was on a voyage from Saint Petersburg, Russia to London.
Platoff	United Kingdom	The ship was wrecked on the Falsterbo Reef, in the Baltic Sea off the coast of Sweden. Her crew were rescued. She was on a voyage from Saint Petersburg to Sunderland, County Durham.

=== 29 November ===
List of shipwrecks: 29 November 1815
Ship	State	Description
Peggy	United Kingdom	The ship was wrecked at Pollyhavy.

=== 30 November ===
List of shipwrecks: 30 November 1815
Ship	State	Description
Glamorgan	United Kingdom	The ship was abandoned in the Baltic Sea off Memel, Prussia. She was on a voyage from Memel to Grimsby, Lincolnshire. Glamorgan came ashore at Domesnes, Norway in early December.
John and Francis	United Kingdom	The ship was abandoned in the Atlantic Ocean (51°00′N 14°32′W). She was on a voyage from Alicante, Spain to London.
Milan	United Kingdom	The ship ran aground on the Owers Sandbank, in the English Channel and sank with the loss of eight lives. She was on a voyage from Altea, Spain to London.
Rose	United Kingdom	The ship was driven ashore at Peterhead, Aberdeenshire. She was on a voyage from South Shields, County Durham to Cromarty.
William	(United Kingdom of Great Britain and Ireland) British North America	The ship was driven ashore in St. Marys Bay, Nova Scotia. She was on a voyage from Halifax, Nova Scotia, to Newfoundland.

=== Unknown date ===
List of shipwrecks: Unknown date in November 1815
Ship	State	Description
Ann	United Kingdom	The ship was driven ashore near St. Andero, Spain. Her crew were rescued. She was on a voyage from Corunna to Bilboa, Spain.
Anna	United Kingdom	The ship was driven ashore and wrecked at Dublin. She was on a voyage from a Norwegian port to Dublin.
Carl Wilhelm	Flag unknown	The ship foundered in the Irish Sea off Wicklow, United Kingdom. She was on a voyage from Drogheda, County Louth, United Kingdom to Cádiz, Spain.
Champion	United Kingdom	The full-rigged ship was driven ashore on Fox Island, New Brunswick, British North America.
Country Squire	United Kingdom	The ship was driven ashore on Cape Breton Island, Nova Scotia, British North America. She was on a voyage from London to Miramichi, New Brunswick, British North America.
Dora	United Kingdom	The ship was wrecked on Pembrey Sands, Pembrokeshire. She was on a voyage from Roscarberry, County Cork to Cardiff, Glamorgan.
Eliza	United Kingdom	The sloop foundered off Cape Clear Island, County Cork. Her three crew were rescued by Feado (United Kingdom).
Endeavour	United Kingdom	The sloop ran aground at Hull, Yorkshire and was wrecked.
Erigone	Russia	The ship was wrecked on Saaremaa. Her crew were rescued. She was on a voyage from London to Riga.
Gainsborough Packet	United Kingdom	The ship was lost near Cape St. Mary's Portugal. Her crew were rescued. She was on a voyage from Hull to Seville, Spain.
Gertrude	(United Kingdom of Great Britain and Ireland) British North America	The schooner was driven ashore in the St. Lawrence River. She was on a voyage from Gaspée to Quebec City, Lower Canada.
John	United Kingdom	The ship was destroyed by fire at Saint Petersburg, Russia.
John and Francis	United Kingdom	The brig foundered in the Atlantic Ocean. Her crew were rescued by Speculator (United Kingdom).
Lady Prevost	(United Kingdom of Great Britain and Ireland) British North America	The brig was driven ashore in the St. Lawrence River. She was on a voyage from Halifax, Nova Scotia, to Quebec City.
Lord Wellington	United Kingdom	The ship was driven ashore at Savannah, Georgia, United States.
Margaret	United Kingdom	The ship was lost at Domesnes, Norway. She was on a voyage from London to Riga.
Myrtle	United Kingdom	The ship collided with another vessel at Plymouth, Devon and was severely damaged.
Nelson	United Kingdom	The ship was lost near New York, United States. She was on a voyage from London to New York, Grenada and Saint Vincent.
Perseverance	United Kingdom	The ship struck a rock near Strömstadt, Sweden and was damaged. She was on a voyage from "Sundawall" to Hull. She was refloated on 28 November and taken in to Gothenburg, Sweden.
Placentia	United Kingdom	The ship foundered in the Atlantic Ocean off Fogo, Newfoundland, British North America, with the loss of all hands. She was on a voyage from Labrador to Newfoundland.
Swift	United Kingdom	The ship sank at Pill, Somerset. She was on a voyage from Waterford to Bristol, Gloucestershire.
Tredegar	United Kingdom	The sloop was wrecked on the Fairness Rock, off Margate, Kent. Her crew were rescued. She was on a voyage from Limerick to Newport, Monmouthshire.
Union	United Kingdom	The ship sprang a leak and foundered in the Indian Ocean off Trincomalee, Ceylon. Her crew were rescued.
Union	India	The ship, Schultz, master, of and for Bengal, foundered east of Java Head. She was on a voyage from Port Jackson to Bengal, India,
Union	United Kingdom	The ship, Barker, master, from Bengal to Batavia, Netherlands East Indies and an English port, was lost around November 1815, about a month after leaving Bengal.
Victory	United Kingdom	The ship sprang a leak in the Atlantic Ocean (45°56′N 40°20′W) and foundered. She was on a voyage from Charleston, South Carolina, United States to Liverpool, Lancashire.
William	United Kingdom	The ship was run down and sunk by a collier whilst on a voyage from Great Yarmouth, Norfolk, to London.
Xanthus	United Kingdom	The ship was wrecked on the Haisborough Sands. She was on a voyage from Newcastle upon Tyne, Northumberland to New York, United States.

== December ==
=== 1 December ===
List of shipwrecks: 1 December 1815
Ship	State	Description
Autumn	United Kingdom	The ship caught fire off Bridlington, Yorkshire. She was beached but was destroyed. Her crew were rescued.
Lyon	United Kingdom	The ship was wrecked at Bideford, Devon.
Unnamed	Netherlands	The galiot was wrecked at Barnstaple, Devon.
Wilding	United Kingdom	The ship collided with the quayside at Liverpool, Lancashire, drove her anchor through her bow and became waterlogged. She was on a voyage from Arkhangelsk, Russia to Liverpool.

=== 2 December ===
List of shipwrecks: 2 December 1815
Ship	State	Description
Concord	France	The ship ran aground near Swansea, Glamorgan, United Kingdom. She was on a voyage from Cette, Hérault to Antwerp, Netherlands.
Forrest	United States	The ship was wrecked on Exuma, Bahamas. Her crew were rescued.
Mars	United Kingdom	The ship was lost near Savannah, Georgia, United States. Her crew were rescued. She was on a voyage from London to Savannah.
Porcupine	United Kingdom	The ship ran aground on the Maplin Sand, in the North Sea off the coast of Essex. She was refloated and taken in to Stangate Creek.
Traveller	United Kingdom	The brig was driven ashore and wrecked east of Lindesnes, Norway. Her crew were rescued. She was on a voyage from Riga, Russia to Dundee, Forfarshire.

=== 3 December ===
List of shipwrecks: 3 December 1815
Ship	State	Description
Adamant	United Kingdom	The brig was driven ashore near Seaford, Sussex. She was refloated and made for Newhaven, Sussex but consequently foundered. Her crew were rescued. Adamant was on a voyage from Malta to London.
Mary	United Kingdom	The ship departed from Sunderland, County Durham for London. No further trace, presumed foundered in the North Sea with the loss of all hands.
Reine des Agnes	France	The ship was abandoned off "Cordova". She was on a voyage from Havre de Grâce, Seine-Inférieure to Bordeaux, Gironde.

=== 4 December ===
List of shipwrecks: 4 December 1815
Ship	State	Description
Alpha	United Kingdom	The ship was wrecked at Ayr.
Ardent	United Kingdom	The ship ran aground on the Nob Sand, in the North Sea and foundered with the loss of all but one of her crew. She was on a voyage from Caernarfon to London.
Hope	United Kingdom	The ship was wrecked at Ayr. She was on a voyage from Dublin to Greenock, Renfrewshire.
Leda	United Kingdom	The ship was driven ashore on Long Island, New York, United States. All on board were rescued.
Minerva	United States	The ship was driven ashore in the River Mersey. She was on a voyage from New York City, United States to Liverpool, Lancashire. Minerva was later refloated and taken in to Liverpool.

=== 5 December ===
List of shipwrecks: 5 December 1815
Ship	State	Description
Cerberus	United Kingdom	The ship was driven ashore on the north coast of Scotland. She was on a voyage from a port in New Brunswick, British North America to Liverpool, Lancashire. She was refloated.
Jeune	France	The ship foundered off the Île de Ré, Charente-Inférieure. Her crew were rescued. She was on a voyage from Nantes, Loire-Inférieure to Bordeaux, Gironde.
John and Mary	United Kingdom	The ship foundered in St. Bride's Bay. She was on a voyage from Dungarvan, County Waterford to Cardiff, Glamorgan.
Wohlfarth	Danzig	The ship was driven ashore at Rye, Sussex, United Kingdom. She was on a voyage from Plymouth, Devon, United Kingdom to Danzig. Wohlfarth was refloated the next day but came ashore again owing to a damaged rudder.
York	United Kingdom	The ship was destroyed by fire at Belfast, County Antrim.
Unnamed	Flag unknown	The galiot was wrecked on Düne.

=== 6 December ===
List of shipwrecks: 6 December 1815
Ship	State	Description
Agenora	Norway	The ship was driven ashore at Ostend, West Flanders, Netherlands. She was on a voyage from Porsgrund to Sint Maarten.
Alert	United Kingdom	The ship was driven ashore and wrecked at Woodbridge, Suffolk.
Ann and Elizabeth	United Kingdom	The ship was driven ashore and wrecked at Shellness, Isle of Sheppey, Kent. She was on a voyage from Fowey, Cornwall, to London.
Arethusa	United Kingdom	The ship was driven ashore between Great Yarmouth, Norfolk, and Lowestoft, Suffolk. Her crew were rescued.
Autumn	United Kingdom	The ship ran aground on the South Ham Sand, in the North Sea.
Betsey	United Kingdom	The ship was driven ashore at Great Yarmouth.
Betsey	United Kingdom	The ship was driven ashore at Mundesley, Norfolk.
Blagden	United Kingdom	The ship was wrecked on the Herd Sand, in the North Sea off the coast of County Durham.
Buccleugh	United Kingdom	The ship was driven ashore between Great Yarmouth and Lowestoft. Her crew were rescued. She was on a voyage from London to Leith, Lothian.
Cerberus	United Kingdom	The ship was driven ashore on the coast of Argyllshire. She was later refloated.
Charlotta	Sweden	The ship was wrecked on the Long Sand, in the North Sea. Her crew were rescued by George Hibbert (United Kingdom). Charlotta was on a voyage from Gothenburg to Lisbon, Portugal.
Clara	France	The ship was wrecked at Saint-Pierre-en-Port, Seine-Inférieure with the loss of three lives. She was on a voyage from Havre de Grâce, Seine-Inférieure to Calais.
Cornwall	United Kingdom	The schooner was driven ashore at Broadstairs, Kent. She was on a voyage from Truro, Cornwall to London. Cornwall was later refloated and taken in to Ramsgate, Kent.
Darlington	United Kingdom	The ship was driven ashore at Corton, Suffolk. She was on a voyage from London to Sunderland, County Durham.
Eliza	United Kingdom	The ship was driven ashore between Great Yarmouth and Lowestoft. Her crew were rescued. She was on a voyage from London to Hull, Yorkshire. Eliza was later refloated and taken in to Great Yarmouth.
Fame	United Kingdom	The ship was driven ashore and wrecked at Shellness. She was on a voyage from Seville, Spain to London.
Fife	United Kingdom	The sloop was lost in Yell Sound. Her crew were rescued.
Flora	United Kingdom	The ship was driven ashore at Great Yarmouth. She was later refloated and taken into that port.
Fortitude	United Kingdom	The ship was driven ashore at Kirkley, Suffolk. She was on a voyage from London to Sunderland. Fortitude was later refloated and taken in to Great Yarmouth.
Fortune	United Kingdom	The ship was driven ashore at Whitstable, Kent. She was on a voyage from Newcastle upon Tyne, Northumberland to London.
Frau Anna	United Kingdom	The ship ran aground at Falsterbo, Sweden. Her crew were rescued. She was on a voyage from Riga, Russia to Plymouth, Devon.
Generous Friends	United Kingdom	The transport ship was driven ashore and wrecked at Deal, Kent. Her crew were rescued.
George and Harriet	United Kingdom	The transport ship was driven ashore and sank at Dunkerque, Nord, France.
George and Mary	United Kingdom	The ship was wrecked on the Herd Sand, in the North Sea, with the loss of a crew member.
Greenock	United Kingdom	The ship foundered in Sligo Bay with the loss of two of her crew.
Gluckleit	Stettin	The ship was wrecked off Sandwich, Kent. Her crew were rescued. She was on a voyage from Stettin to Bordeaux, Gironde, France.
Gunson	United Kingdom	The ship was wrecked on the Gunfleet Sand, in the North Sea off the coast of Suffolk. She was on a voyage from Newcastle upon Tyne to London.
Harmony	United Kingdom	The ship was driven ashore between Great Yarmouth and Lowestoft. Her crew were rescued.
Hastings	United Kingdom	The ship was driven ashore at Great Yarmouth. Her crew were rescued.
Industry	Netherlands	The ship was wrecked on the Fairness Rock, off Margate, Kent. She was on a voyage from Lisbon, Portugal to Rotterdam, South Holland.
Irton	United Kingdom	The ship foundered in the North Sea off Orfordness, Suffolk. She was on a voyage from London to South Shields, County Durham.
Jane	United Kingdom	The ship was driven ashore at Great Yarmouth. Her crew were rescued.
Jane	United Kingdom	The collier, a brig, was wrecked off Sandwich, Kent. She was on a voyage from Plymouth, Devon to South Shields, County Durham.
Jason	United Kingdom	The ship sank at Whitby, Yorkshire. Her crew were rescued. She was on a voyage from Newcastle upon Tyne to Ramsgate, Kentm.
John and Susan	United Kingdom	The sloop was driven ashore and wrecked at Deal.
Laurel	United Kingdom	The ship departed from Sunderland. No further trace; presumed foundered with the loss of all hands.
Leipzig	United Kingdom	The brig was wrecked at Great Yarmouth with the loss of a crew member. Survivors were rescued by Manby mortar. She was on a voyage from Zante, United States of the Ionian Islands to Hull.
Lord Huntley	United Kingdom	The ship ran aground on the Gunfleet Sand. She was refloated and taken in to Colchester, Essex.
Louisa	United Kingdom	The ship was driven ashore at Horsey, Norfolk. Her crew were rescued. She was on a voyage from Newcastle upon Tyne to London.
Minerva	United Kingdom	The ship was driven ashore and wrecked at Wells-next-the-Sea, Norfolk.
Nancy	United Kingdom	The ship was driven ashore between Great Yarmouth and Lowestoft. Her crew were rescued. She was on a voyage from London to Hull. Nancy was later refloated and taken into Great Yarmouth, United Kingdom.
Neath Castle	United Kingdom	The ship was driven ashore on the Sandwich Flats. She was on a voyage from Portsmouth, Hampshire to London.
Nimrod	United Kingdom	The ship was driven ashore between Great Yarmouth and Lowestoft. Her crew were rescued.
Œolus	Danzig	The ship was driven ashore at Gunton, Suffolk. She was on a voyage from Danzig to Liverpool, Lancashire, United Kingdom. She was later refloated and taken in to Harwich, Essex, where she arrived on 28 December.
Oglebarony	United Kingdom	The ship was driven ashore between Great Yarmouth and Lowestoft.
Palemon	United Kingdom	The brig was driven ashore on the Andrews Sandbank, in the North Sea off Harwich, Essex with the loss of a crew member. She was on a voyage from Zante, United States of the Ionian Islands to Hull. Palemon was later refloated and taken into Harwich.
Peace	United Kingdom	The brig was driven ashore at Deal. She was on a voyage from Gijón, Spain to London.
Pearl	United Kingdom	The transport ship, a brig, was driven ashore at Kingsdown, Kent.
Peggy	United Kingdom	The brig was driven ashore at Kingsdown. She was on a voyage from Quebec, Lower Canada, British North America to London.
Pére de Famille	France	The ship was driven ashore and wrecked at Dunkerque, Nord. She was on a voyage from Marseille, Bouches-du-Rhône to Dunkerque.
Robert and Mary	United Kingdom	The ship departed from Sunderland, County Durham. No further trace; presumed foundered with the loss of all hands.
Ruby	United Kingdom	The schooner was driven ashore and wrecked at Bawdsey, Suffolk.
Sara	Sweden	The ship was wrecked on The Swin, in the North Sea, with the loss of all but one of her crew. She was on a voyage from Gothenburg to Saint-Brieuc, Côtes-du-Nord, France.
Sophia	Sweden	The ship was driven ashore. She was on a voyage from Stockholm to Lisbon, Portugal. She was refloated and taken in to Sheerness, Kent.
Thomas and Martha	United Kingdom	The ship was driven ashore at Great Yarmouth. She was later refloated.
Three Friends	United Kingdom	The ship foundered in the North Sea off the coast of Lincolnshire.
Two Brothers	United Kingdom	The ship was driven ashore at Pakefield, Suffolk. She was on a voyage from London to Newcastle upon Tyne.
William	United Kingdom	The ship was driven ashore at Great Yarmouth. Her crew were rescued.
Williamson	United Kingdom	The ship was run down and sunk in the North Sea off the mouth of the Humber by Lord Melville (United Kingdom) with the loss of three of her six crew. Williamson was on a voyage from Sunderland to Brighton, Sussex.
Woodbridge	United Kingdom	The East Indiaman was driven ashore near St Nicholas-at-Wade, Kent, United Kingdom. She was on a voyage from Batavia, Netherlands East Indies to London. Woodbridge was refloated on 14 December.
25 unnamed vessels	United Kingdom	The ships were driven ashore between Great Yarmouth and Mundesley.
Unnamed	Netherlands	The hoy ran aground on the North Sand Head, off the coast of Kent.
Unnamed	Flag unknown	The galiot ran aground on the Goodwin Sands.
Unnamed	Flag unknown	The galiot was driven ashore and wrecked at Shellness with the loss of all hands.
Unnamed	Flag unknown	The ship ran aground on the Nore.
Unnamed	Flag unknown	The ship was wrecked north of Sumburgh Head, Shetland Islands with the loss of all hands.

=== 7 December ===
List of shipwrecks: 7 December 1815
Ship	State	Description
Albina	United Kingdom	The ship was driven ashore at Herne Bay, Kent. She subsequently refloated and foundered. Her crew were rescued.
Albion	United Kingdom	The ship was driven ashore at Whitstable, Kent. She was on a voyage from Great Yarmouth, Norfolk to Liverpool, Lancashire.
Argo	United Kingdom	The ship was wrecked on the Nore Sand, in the North Sea.
Betsey	United Kingdom	The ship was driven ashore at Great Yarmouth. She was later refloated.
Briton	United Kingdom	The ship was driven ashore at Southwold, Suffolk. Her crew were rescued. She was on a voyage from London to Scarborough, Yorkshire. Briton was later refloated and taken in to Southwold.
Carlsham	Sweden	The ship was driven ashore at Gravelines, Nord, France, with the loss of all but six of her crew. She was on a voyage from Stockholm to Lisbon, Portugal.
Complete	United Kingdom	The sloop was driven ashore on the coast of Kent. She was on a vyage from London to Portsmouth, Hampshire. She was refloated and taken in to Dover, Kent.
Concord	United Kingdom	The ship was wrecked on the Goodwin Sands, Kent.
De Jacob	Netherlands	The galiot was driven ashore and wrecked at Padstow, Cornwall, United Kingdom with the loss of all hands.
De Neptune	Netherlands	The galiot was driven ashore and wrecked between New Romney and Lydd, Kent, with the loss of a crew member. She was on a voyage from Ostend, West Flanders to Lisbon, Portugal.
Edmund Lockyer	United Kingdom	The ship was driven ashore at Gravelines, Nord, France. Her crew were rescued. She was on a voyage from Plymouth, Devon to Hull, Yorkshire.
Eliza	United Kingdom	The ship was driven ashore near Great Yarmouth. She was on a voyage from London to Hull. She was later refloated and taken in to Great Yarmouth.
Elizabeth & Mary	United Kingdom	The ship was driven ashore on the Modder Sand, in the Zuyder Zee.
Erlinda	Stettin	The ship was driven ashore near Boulogne, Pas-de-Calais, France. She was on a voyage from Stettin to Dublin, United Kingdom.
Erstaningen	Norway	The ship was driven ashore at West Cowes, Isle of Wight, United Kingdom.
Flora	United Kingdom	The ship was driven ashore near Great Yarmouth. She was later refloated and taken in to Great Yarmouth.
Friendship's Increase	United Kingdom	The sloop was driven ashore and wrecked near Dover, Kent, with the loss of two of her four crew. She was on a voyage from London to Portsmouth, Hampshire.
George and Mary	United Kingdom	The sloop was wrecked on the Herd Sand, in the North Sea, with the loss of two of her crew. Survivors were rescued by the North Shields Lifeboat.
Gluckett	Prussia	The galiot was wrecked on the Sandwich Flats. She was on a voyage from Stettin to Bordeaux, Gironde, France.
Henrietta	United Kingdom	The ship foundered in the North Sea off Sunderland, County Durham with the loss of all hands.
Hope	United Kingdom	The ship was driven ashore and wrecked at Staintondale, Yorkshire with the loss of three of her crew. She was on a voyage from Sunderland to London.
James, or Jane	United Kingdom	The brig was driven ashore and wrecked on the Sandwich Flats. Her crew were rescued. She was on a voyage from Plymouth, Devon to South Shields, County Durham.
Jane	United Kingdom	The ship was driven ashore at Great Yarmouth. She was later refloated.
Jane and Betsey	United Kingdom	The sloop was driven ashore and wrecked at Fraserburgh, Aberdeenshire. She was on a voyage from Inverness to Portsoy, Aberdeenshire.
Leeds	United Kingdom	The ship was wrecked on the coast of Finland 20 leagues (60 nautical miles (110 km)) off Kronstadt, Russia. She was on a voyage from Saint Petersburg, Russia to London.
Maria	United Kingdom	The ship was lost near Barfleur, Manche, France, with the loss of a crew member. She was on a voyage from Livorno, Kingdom of Etruria to London.
Maria	United Kingdom	The ship was driven ashore 6 nautical miles (11 km) west of Calais, France. Her crew were rescued. She was on a voyage from Great Yarmouth to Liverpool.
Maria Christina	Sweden	The ship was driven ashore on the Modder Sand, off Amsterdam, North Holland, Netherlands.
Marquis of Huntley	United Kingdom	The ship was driven ashore near Sheerness, Kent. She was on a voyage from London to Trieste. She was refloated with assistance.
Nancy	United Kingdom	The ship was driven ashore near Great Yarmouth. She was later refloated and taken in to Great Yarmouth.
Neptune	United Kingdom	The ship was wrecked near Dover with the loss of a crew member. She was on a voyage from Ostend, West Flanders, Netherlands to Lisbon, Portugal.
Neutral	United Kingdom	The ship was driven ashore at Wainfleet, Lincolnshire. She was on a voyage from Wisbech, Cambridgeshire to Leeds, Yorkshire.
Nimrod	United Kingdom	The ship was driven ashore at Great Yarmouth. She was later refloated.
Peace	United Kingdom	The brig was driven ashore and wrecked at Deal, Kent. She was on a voyage from Gijón, Spain to London.
Pearl	United Kingdom	The transport ship, a brig, was driven ashore near Kingsdown, Kent.
Peggy	United Kingdom	The brig was driven ashore near Kingsdown. She was on a voyage from Quebec City, British North America to London.
Phœnix	United Kingdom	The brig foundered in the North Sea off Spurn Point, Yorkshire. She was on a voyage from South Shields to London.
Princess Amelia	United Kingdom	The ship was driven ashore at Westgate, Kent. She was on a voyage from Dublin to London.
Regina	Hamburg	The galiot was driven ashore and wrecked at Dungeness, Kent with the loss of nine of her ten crew. She was on a voyage from Richmond, Virginia, United States to Hamburg.
Rover	United Kingdom	The transport ship was driven ashore at Bexhill-on-Sea, Sussex. She was refloated on 15 December and taken in to Ramsgate, Kent in a leaky condition.
Ruby	United Kingdom	The schooner was wrecked off Bawdsey, Suffolk.
Sarah Johanna	Sweden	The ship was driven ashore at Amsterdam.
Sophia	Sweden	The ship was driven ashore near Sheerness. She was later refloated and taken into Sheerness.
Sophia	United Kingdom	The ship was driven ashore at Ostend.
Tynemouth Castle	United Kingdom	The ship was driven ashore and wrecked near Calais with the loss of all hands. She was on a voyage from Plymouth, Devon to South Shields.
Virginie	France	The ship was wrecked near Barfleur, Manche. Her crew were rescued. She was on a voyage from Cette, Hérault to Havre de Grâce, Seine-Inférieure.
Vriendschap	Netherlands	The ship was driven ashore on Texel, North Holland. She was on a voyage from Amsterdam to London. Vriendschap was later refloated and taken into the Nieuw Diep.
William	United Kingdom	The ship was driven ashore at Hoylake, Lancashire. She was on a voyage from Waterford to Liverpool, Lancashire. She was later refloated and taken in to Liverpool.
Unnamed	Flag unknown	The ship were driven ashore at Dungeness.
Unnamed	United Kingdom	The smack foundered off Dungeness with the loss of all hands .
Two unnamed vessels	United Kingdom	A ship and a brig were wrecked at Barfleur. The ship was lost with all hands. The brig's crew were rescued.

=== 8 December ===
List of shipwrecks: 8 December 1815
Ship	State	Description
Hero	United Kingdom	The ship was driven ashore at Hartlepool, County Durham. Her crew were rescued.
Jaagens	Netherlands	The ship foundered in the Bay of Biscay off A Coruña, Spain. Her crew were rescued. She was on a voyage from the Netherlands to Lisbon, Portugal.
Lark	United Kingdom	The ship was driven ashore at Calais, France. She was on a voyage from Antwerp, Netherlands to Newhaven, Sussex. Lark was later refloated.
Maria	Sweden	The brig was in collision with another vessel. She was abandoned the next day due to damage sustained. Her seven crew were rescued by Elizabeth and Oakes (both United Kingdom). Maria was on a voyage from Málaga, Spain to Amsterdam, North Holland, Netherlands.
Neptunus	Stettin	The ship was abandoned whilst on a voyage from Stettin to Bordeaux, Gironde, France.
Providence	United Kingdom	The ship was wrecked at the mouth of the River Tees with the loss of all but one of her crew.
Two Friends	United Kingdom	The Thames barge was driven ashore and was wrecked at Dover, Kent. All on board were rescued.
Ulysses	United States	The ship was driven ashore and wrecked at Hempstead, New York. She was on a voyage from Curaçao to New York City.

=== 9 December ===
List of shipwrecks: 9 December 1815
Ship	State	Description
Anna Dorothea	Netherlands	The ship was abandoned in the North Sea. She was on a voyage from Saint Petersburg, Russia to Amsterdam, North Holland.
Caroline	France	The ship was lost near Caen, Calvados. Her crew were rescued.
Henry and Mary	United Kingdom	The ship was in collision with Brilliant (United Kingdom) off Great Cumbrae and sank. Her crew were rescued. Henry and Mary was on a voyage from Glasgow, Renfrewshire to an Irish port.
Hope	United Kingdom	The ship was driven ashore at North Somercotes, Lincolnshire. Her crew were rescued. She was on a voyage from Bridlington, Yorkshire to London.
Lark	United Kingdom	The ship was wrecked at Bridlington.
Mary	United Kingdom	The ship was discovered crewless off the coast of Finistère, France. An attempt was made to take her into Brest, but she was taken into Plymouth, Devon, due to the prevailing winds. Mary had been on a voyage from Belfast, County Antrim to Lisbon, Portugal.
Minerva	United Kingdom	The ship was driven ashore at Bridlington. She was later refloated.
Vaillant	France	The brig was wrecked at Saint-Valery-en-Caux, Seine-Inférieure with the loss of all hands.

=== 10 December ===
List of shipwrecks: 10 December 1815
Ship	State	Description
Aberdeen	United Kingdom	The ship was abandoned in the Atlantic Ocean (39°16′N 70°30′W). She was on a voyage from Liverpool, Lancashire to Philadelphia, Pennsylvania, United States.
Duke of Wellington	United Kingdom	The ship was driven ashore by ice as Maassluis, South Holland, Netherlands. She was later refloated and taken in to Maassluis.
Indefatigable	United Kingdom	The snow ran aground on the East Barrow Sand, in the North Sea off the coast of Essex. She was on a voyage from Memel, Prussia to South Shields, County Durham and London. Indefatigable was taken in to Sheerness, Kent on 11 December
Speculator	United Kingdom	The ship was lost near Savannah, Georgia, United States, with the loss of seven of her crew. She was on a voyage from Jamaica to Havana, Cuba.
Twee Gebroeders	Netherlands	The ship was sunk by ice at Maassluis. She was on a voyage from Rotterdam, South Holland to A Coruña, Spain.

=== 11 December ===
List of shipwrecks: 11 December 1815
Ship	State	Description
Elizabeth and Ann	United Kingdom	The ship was driven ashore at Rattray Head, Aberdeenshire. She was on a voyage from Miramichi, New Brunswick, British North America to Grangemouth, Stirlingshire. She was later refloated and taken into Peterhead in a waterlogged condition.
Primrose	United Kingdom	The ship sank at Harwich, Essex. She was on a voyage from Great Yarmouth, Norfolk to Southampton, Hampshire.

=== 12 December ===
List of shipwrecks: 11 December 1815
Ship	State	Description
Anaconda	United States	The ship was driven ashore at Montego Bay, Jamaica. She was on a voyage from Kingston, Jamaica to Philadelphia, Pennsylvania.

=== 13 December ===
List of shipwrecks: 13 December 1815
Ship	State	Description
Favourite	United Kingdom	The ship was driven ashore and damaged at Lerwick, Shetland Islands. She was later refloated.
Jerusalem	Spain	The full-rigged ship was wrecked on the Florida Reef, United States. She was on a voyage from Havana, Cuba to an African port.
Maria Sophia	(United Kingdom of Great Britain and Ireland) Guernsey	The ship was sighted in Øresund whilst on a voyage from Saint Petersburg, Russia to Guernsey. No further trace, presumed foundered with the loss of all hands.

=== 14 December ===
List of shipwrecks: 14 December 1815
Ship	State	Description
Friends	United Kingdom	The ship foundered off Gothenburg, Sweden. Her crew were rescued. She was on a voyage from Newcastle upon Tyne, Northumberland to Copenhagen, Denmark.
Minerva	United Kingdom	The brig sank at Ramsgate, Kent.
Minerva	United Kingdom	The ship sank at Harwich, Essex, United Kingdom.
Nelly	United Kingdom	The ship foundered in the Adriatic Sea off Chioggia, Kingdom of Lombardy–Venetia with the loss of five lives. She was on a voyage from London to Venice, Kingdom of Lombardy–Venetia.

=== 15 December ===
List of shipwrecks: 15 December 1815
Ship	State	Description
Saltcoats	United Kingdom	The ship was wrecked 6 nautical miles (11 km) from Campbeltown, Argyllshire. She was on a voyage from Quebec, Lower Canada, British North America to Belfast, County Antrim.

=== 16 December ===
List of shipwrecks: 16 December 1815
Ship	State	Description
Hawker	United Kingdom	The ship was driven ashore in the River Mersey. She was on a voyage from St. Andrews, New Brunswick, British North America to Liverpool, Lancashire. Hawker was refloated in mid-January 1816.
Lord Collingwood	United Kingdom	The ship ran aground on the Gunfleet Sand, in the North Sea off the coast of Suffolk. She was on a voyage from Newcastle upon Tyne, Northumberland to the Cape of Good Hope, Cape Colony. She was refloated with the assistance of two smacks and taken in to Harwich, Essex.
Louisa Ulrica	Sweden	The ship was wrecked near Stavanger, Norway. She was on a voyage from Lisbon, Portugal to St. Ubes, Portugal and Stockholm, Sweden.
Martha	United Kingdom	The ship was driven ashore in the River Shannon. She was refloated on 18 December and discovered to be severely damaged. Martha was on a voyage from Limerick to Jamaica.
Robert	United Kingdom	The ship foundered in the North Sea off Wells-next-the-Sea, Norfolk with some loss of life.
Thetis	United Kingdom	The ship was lost near Sunderland, County Durham. She was on a voyage from London to South Shields, County Durham.

=== 17 December ===
List of shipwrecks: 17 December 1815
Ship	State	Description
Augusta	United Kingdom	The ship was driven ashore at Liverpool, Lancashire. She was on a voyage from Miramichi, New Brunswick, British North America to Liverpool.
Catch me if you can	United Kingdom	The schooner foundered in the English Channel off Worthing, Sussex.
Esther	United Kingdom	The ship was driven ashore at Garston, Liverpool. She was on a voyage from St. Domingo to Liverpool.
Integrity	United States	The ship was driven ashore at Liverpool. She was on a voyage from New York to Liverpool
James and Jean	United Kingdom	The sloop was wrecked on the Carr Rock, in the Firth of Forth. Her crew survived. She was on a voyage from South Queensferry, Lothian to Perth.
John and James	United Kingdom	The brig was wrecked at Corsewall Point, Wigtownshire, with the loss of five of her eight crew. She was on a voyage from Pictou, Nova Scotia, British North America to Saltcoats, Ayrshire.
Jonge Antjie Dirk	Netherlands	The ship was wrecked at Egmond aan Zee, North Holland. Her crew were rescued. She was on a voyage from Newcastle upon Tyne, Northumberland, United Kingdom to Rotterdam, South Holland.
Mary	United States	The ship was driven ashore at Liverpool. She was on a voyage from Charleston, South Carolina, to Liverpool.
Trident	United Kingdom	The ship was driven ashore at Liverpool. She was on a voyage from Liverpool to New York. She was later refloated and taken in to Liverpool.
Susannah Maria	Netherlands	The ship was driven ashore on Texel, North Holland. She was on a voyage from Surinam to New York and Amsterdam, North Holland. Susannah Maria was refloated on 24 December.
Swerben, or Swertes	Prussia	The ship sprang a leak and foundered with the loss of all but two of her crew. Survivors were rescued by Enigheten ( Sweden). The Prussian ship was on a voyage from Sint Maarten to Antwerp, Netherlands.
Trident	United Kingdom	The ship was driven ashore at Liverpool. She was on a voyage from New York to Liverpool.

== =18 December ==
List of shipwrecks: 18 December 1815
Ship	State	Description
Twee Gesusters	Bremen	The ship was wrecked on Wangerooge. Her crew were rescued. She was on a voyage from Bordeaux, Gironde, France to Bremen.

=== 19 December ===
List of shipwrecks: 19 December 1815
Ship	State	Description
Ann	United Kingdom	The brig was wrecked on the Lemon and Ore Sand, in the North Sea. She was on a voyage from Memel, Prussia to an English port. Ann was taken into Heligoland on 1 January 1816, but subsequently drove ashore on Düne.
Friend's Goodwill	United Kingdom	The ship was driven against the pier and wrecked at Ramsgate, Kent with the loss of two of her crew.
Mary	United Kingdom	The ship was driven ashore at Aber Wrac'h, Finistère, France. Her crew were rescued. She was on a voyage from Belfast, County Antrim to Lisbon, Portugal. Mary was refloated and taken into Brest. She was taken possession of by the French authorities.
Vier Gebroeders	Hamburg	The ship was lost at Cuxhaven. Her crew were rescued. She was on a voyage from Newcastle upon Tyne, Northumberland, United Kingdom to Hamburg.
Warren	United Kingdom	The ship foundered in Ramsay Sound. Her crew were rescued. She was on a voyage from Dublin to Chepstow, Monmouthshire.
William	United Kingdom	The ship was driven ashore at Miramichi, New Brunswick, British North America. She was on a voyage from Miramichi to Liverpool. William was refloated the next day and resumed her voyage to Liverpool, where she arrived on 13 January 1816.

=== 20 December ===
List of shipwrecks: 20 December 1815
Ship	State	Description
Argus	United Kingdom	The ship was driven ashore at Cromer, Norfolk with the loss of a crew member. She was later refloated and taken to Grimsby, Lincolnshire. Argus was on a voyage from Zante, United States of the Ionian Islands to Hull, Yorkshire.
Carl August	Netherlands	The ship ran aground on Texel, North Holland. She was refloated on 23 December.
Defence	United Kingdom	The ship sank at Whitehaven, Cumberland.
Friend's Goodwill	United Kingdom	The ship was driven ashore and wrecked at Ramsgate, Kent with the loss of four lives. She was on a voyage from Sunderland, County Durham to Ramsgate.
Humber	United Kingdom	The ship was wrecked off Low Hauxley, Northumberland. Her crew were rescued.
Jean	United Kingdom	The ship was wrecked off Low Hauxley.
John	United Kingdom	The ship was driven ashore on Coquet Island, Northumberland.
Lord Nelson	United Kingdom	The ship was driven ashore between Marske-by-the-Sea and Saltburn-by-the-Sea, Yorkshire. Her crew were rescued. She was on a voyage from Boston, Lincolnshire to Stockton-on-Tees, County Durham.
Milford	United Kingdom	The ship was driven ashore and damaged at Deal, Kent. She was on a voyage from Bombay, India to London. Milford was refloated with assistance and taken in to The Downs.
Neptunus	Sweden	The ship was driven ashore and wrecked 15 nautical miles (28 km) north of Dublin, United Kingdom. Her crew were rescued. She was on a voyage from Uddevalla to Dublin.
Regalia	United Kingdom	The transport ship was driven ashore at Portsmouth, Hampshire. She was refloated and taken in to Portsmouth.
Union	United Kingdom	The ship was driven ashore and wrecked in Belfast Lough. She was on a voyage from Irvine, Ayrshire to Larne, County Antrim.
Vrouw Fennegina	Netherlands	The ship was wrecked on Ameland, Friesland with the loss of three of her crew. She was on a voyage from Bordeaux, Gironde, France to Amsterdam, North Holland.

=== 21 December ===
List of shipwrecks: 21 December 1815
Ship	State	Description
Berry Castle	United Kingdom	The ship ran aground and was damaged at Whitby, Yorkshire. She was on a voyage from London to Whitby. She was refloated.
Camel	United Kingdom	The ship was driven ashore between Seaton Carew and Hartlepool, County Durham. Her crew were rescued.

=== 22 December ===
List of shipwrecks: 22 December 1815
Ship	State	Description
Jane	United Kingdom	The ship was driven ashore at Belfast, County Antrim.
Margaret	United Kingdom	The ship was wrecked at Rhyrland with the loss of all hands. She was on a voyage from Bangor, County Down to Chester, Cheshire.

=== 23 December ===
List of shipwrecks: 23 December 1815
Ship	State	Description
Cyrus	United Kingdom	The ship was wrecked at Milltown Malbay, County Clare. Her crew were rescued She was on a voyage from Newcastle upon Tyne, Northumberland, to Limerick.
Georgiana	United Kingdom	The ship sank in the Danger River, Africa with the loss of all hands.
Union	United Kingdom	The transport ship struck the pier at Ramsgate, Kent and sank. All on board were rescued.

=== 24 December ===
List of shipwrecks: 24 December 1815
Ship	State	Description
Edward	United Kingdom	The ship was driven ashore near Achill Head, County Mayo. She was on a voyage from Richibucto, New Brunswick, British North America to Ayr.
Nancy	United Kingdom	The ship was wrecked on the Cor Bank, in the Atlantic Ocean 15 nautical miles (28 km) off Edlington, North Carolina, United States. Her crew were rescued. She was on a voyage from Greenock, Renfrewshire to Edlington.
Neptunus	Stettin	The ship was driven ashore crewless on the coast of Jutland. She was on a voyage from Stettin to Bordeaux, Gironde, France.

=== 25 December ===
List of shipwrecks: 25 December 1815
Ship	State	Description
Edward	United Kingdom	The ship ran aground on the Herd Sand, in the North Sea off the coast of County Durham. She was on a voyage from London to Newcastle upon Tyne, Northumberland and New York, United States. She was later refloated and taken in to South Shields, County Durham.

=== 26 December ===
List of shipwrecks: 26 December 1815
Ship	State	Description
Juffrow Swantje	Kingdom of Hanover	The ship was wrecked on the White Sand, in the North Sea. She was on a voyage from Leith, Lothian, United Kingdom to Emden.
Lavinia	United Kingdom	The ship was driven ashore in the River Mersey. She was on a voyage from New Brunswick, British North America to Liverpool, Lancashire.
Nancy	United Kingdom	The ship sank at Bridlington, Yorkshire. She was on a voyage from London to Hull, Yorkshire.
Pomona	Hamburg	The ship was lost near Petten, North Holland, Netherlands. Her crew were rescued. She was on a voyage from Hamburg to Oporto, Portugal.
Prosperity	United Kingdom	The sloop ran aground off Sandwich, Kent. She was refloated and taken in to Ramsgate, Kent where she sank the next day. Her crew were rescued. She was on a voyage from London to Havre de Grâce, Seine-Inférieure, France. She was refloated on 3 January 1816.
Venus	United Kingdom	The ship was driven ashore north of Bridlington.
Vrouw Anna Margaretta	Hamburg	The ship was driven ashore on Düne. She was on a voyage from Nantes, Loire-Inférieure, France to Hambrurg.

=== 27 December ===
List of shipwrecks: 27 December 1815
Ship	State	Description
Betsey	United Kingdom	The ship was wrecked at Sunderland, County Durham.
Importer	United States	The ship was driven ashore at Hoylake, Lancashire, United Kingdom. She was on a voyage from Baltimore, Maryland, to Liverpool, Lancashire. Importer was refloated the next day and taken in to Liverpool.
Margaret	United Kingdom	The ship ran aground on the Newcombe Sand, in the North Sea off Great Yarmouth, Norfolk. She was on a voyage from Dundee, Forfarshire to Jamaica. She was refloated.
Medina	United Kingdom	The ship was driven ashore near L'Orient, Morbihan, France. She was on a voyage from Seville, Spain to London. Medina was refloated in February 1816 and taken in to Plymouth, Devon.
South Esk	United Kingdom	The ship was driven ashore near the Black Rocks, in the Firth of Forth. She was on a voyage from London to Newcastle upon Tyne, Northumberland. South Esk was refloated on 5 January 1816 and taken in to Leith, Lothian, in a severely damaged condition.
Zephyr	United Kingdom	The ship was driven ashore at Hoylake. She was on a voyage from Liverpool to Cork.

=== 28 December ===
List of shipwrecks: 28 December 1815
Ship	State	Description
Cerberus	United Kingdom	The ship was driven ashore and wrecked on the coast of Argyllshire.
Surprize	United Kingdom	The brigantine was wrecked on the African coast. All on board survived but were enslaved. She was on a voyage from Glasgow, Renfrewshire to Jamaica. Her crew were released in mid-1816 after a ransom was paid by the Worshipful Company of Ironmongers.

=== 29 December ===
List of shipwrecks: 29 December 1815
Ship	State	Description
Amazon	United Kingdom	The ship was driven ashore in the Clyde. She was on a voyage from the Clyde to Demerara. Amazon was later refloated.
Andrew Jackson	United States	The ship was driven ashore near New London, Maryland. She was on a voyage from Naples to New York.
Annisquam	United States	The ship was driven ashore in the Clyde. She was on a voyage from the Clyde to New York. Annsiquam was later refloated.
Clyde	United Kingdom	The brig was driven ashore in the Clyde. She was on a voyage from the Clyde to Jamaica. Clyde was later refloated.
Columbus	United Kingdom	The ship was driven ashore in the Clyde. She was on a voyage from the Clyde to Jamaica. Columbus was later refloated.
Cuba	United Kingdom	The ship was driven ashore by ice and severely damaged in the Elbe. She was on a voyage from Hamburg to Havana, Cuba. Cuba was refloated on 9 January and put back in to Hamburg.
Greyhound	United Kingdom	The packet ship was wrecked on the Calver Sand, in the Bristol Channel off Bridgwater, Somerset with the loss of all on board, about 100 lives. She was on a voyage from Cork to Bristol, Gloucestershire.
HMS Heron	Royal Navy	The Cruizer-class brig-sloop was driven ashore in the Clyde at Greenock, Renfrewshire. She was later refloated.
Hope	United Kingdom	The ship was driven ashore and wrecked at Campbeltown, Argyllshire. She was on a voyage from an Irish port to Liverpool, Lancashire.
Independence	United Kingdom	The ship was driven ashore in the Clyde. She was on a voyage from the Clyde to New York, United States. Independence was later refloated.
Johanna	United Kingdom	The ship foundered in the North Sea off Wick, Caithness, United Kingdom with the loss of all hands. She was on a voyage from Bordeaux, Gironde, France to Rotterdam, South Holland.
Myrtle	United Kingdom	The ship was driven ashore in the Clyde. She was on a voyage from the Clyde to Livorno, Grand Duchy of Tuscany. Myrtle was later refloated.
Opreisning	Norway	The ship was driven ashore at Movelle, County Londonderry, United Kingdom. She was on a voyage from Londonderry to Trondheim.
Sisters	United Kingdom	The ship was driven ashore at Campbeltown. She was on a voyage from Greenock, Renfrewshire to Liverpool, Lancashire.
Thomas Henry	United Kingdom	The ship was driven ashore in the Clyde. She was on a voyage from the Clyde to St. Domingo. Thomas Henry was later refloated.
William Rathbone	United Kingdom	The ship was driven ashore at Liverpool. She was reported to be on a voyage from Cape Henry, Virginia, United States to St. Domingo. William Rathbone was refloated and beached in the River Mersey on 3 January 1816.

=== 30 December ===
List of shipwrecks: 30 December 1815
Ship	State	Description
Ann	United Kingdom	The ship sprang a leak and was beached south of Bridlington, Yorkshire.
Greyhound	United Kingdom	The transport ship foundered in Bridgwater Bay with the loss of all on board, her crew and twenty passengers. She was on a voyage from Cork to Bristol, Gloucestrshire.
Hartley	United Kingdom	The ship was driven ashore at Sunderland, County Durham. She was on a voyage from London to North Shields, Northumberland. She was later refloated.
Henry	United Kingdom	The ship sank at Whitby, Yorkshire. She was refloated the next day.
Juffrow Catharina	Netherlands	The ship was driven ashore near Katwijk, North Holland. She was on a voyage from Livorno, Grand Duchy of Tuscany to Amsterdam, North Holland.
Perseverance	United States	The ship was lost near Egg Harbour, New Jersey, with the loss of ten of the sixteen people on board. She was on a voyage from Havre de Grâce, Seine-Inférieure, France to New York.
Samaritan	United Kingdom	The ship was driven ashore at Sunderland. She was on a voyage from London to Sunderland. Samaritan was later refloated.
Woolsington	United Kingdom	The ship was driven ashore and wrecked at Sunderland. She was on a voyage from London to North Shields.

=== 31 December ===
List of shipwrecks: 31 December 1815
Ship	State	Description
Eliza	United Kingdom	The ship was lost at Madras, India.
Kron Prins van Oldenburg	Grand Duchy of Oldenburg	The ship was driven ashore on this date.

=== Unknown date ===
List of shipwrecks: Unknown date in December 1815
Ship	State	Description
Adolph	Sweden	The ship was wrecked on the Sunk Sand, in the North Sea off the coast of Essex, United Kingdom. Her crew were rescued. She was on a voyage from Jakobstad to London, United Kingdom.
Alfred	United States	The ship foundered in the Atlantic Ocean (approximately 31°N 16°W). Her crew were rescued by Jean (United Kingdom). Alfred was on a voyage from Cádiz, Spain to Boston, Massachusetts.
Almanna Basta	Sweden	The ship was wrecked near Gothenburg. Her crew were rescued. She was on a voyage from Götaland to "Kongsbacha".
Amelia	United Kingdom	The ship foundered off Aphill Head. Her crew were rescued. She was on a voyage from Memel, Prussia to Limerick.
Ann	United Kingdom	The ship was driven ashore at St. Andero, Spain. Her crew were rescued. She was on a voyage from A Coruña to Bilbao, Spain.
Anthorn	United Kingdom	The ship was driven ashore in the Gulf of St. Lawrence.
Betsey	United Kingdom	The ship was driven ashore near Dunwich, Suffolk. Her crew were rescued. She was on a voyage from Antwerp, Nethelands tp Hull, Yorkshire.
Carl Johan	Sweden	The brig ran aground on the Long Sand, in the North Sea. She was refloated on 12 December and taken into Margate, Kent in a severely damaged condition.
Columbus	United Kingdom	The ship was wrecked in Miramichi Bay. Her crew were rescued.
Concord	United Kingdom	The collier, a brig, was wrecked on the Goodwin Sands, Kent with some loss of life.
Crosby	United Kingdom	The ship foundered in the Atlantic Ocean with some loss of life. She was on a voyage from Miramichi Bay to Liverpool, Lancashire.
Dart	United Kingdom	The ship was driven ashore at Tralee, County Kerry. She was on a voyage from Smyrna, Greece to Liverpool.
Duchess of Gordon	United Kingdom	The ship was driven ashore in the River Lee. She was on a voyage from Cork to Malta.
Duke of Wellington	United Kingdom	The ship was driven ashore at Maassluis, South Holland. She was later refloated and taken into Maassluis.
Elenora Charlota Catharina	Russia	The ship was wrecked on Summer Island.
Eliza & Ann	United Kingdom	The ship was driven ashore at Peterhead, Aberdeenshire. She was later refloated and taken into Peterhead.
Erlinda	Stettin	The ship was driven ashore at Boulogne, Pas-de-Calais, France.
Estrella do Norte	Portugal	The ship struck the Heaps Sand in the North Sea and lost her rudder. Her crew consequently abandoned her. Estrella do Norte was on a voyage from Oporto to Amsterdam, North Holland, Netherlands.
Florida	United Kingdom	The ship was driven ashore at Christiansand, Norway in mid-December. She was on a voyage from Saint Petersburg, Russia to Liverpool.
Frances	United Kingdom	The ship was wrecked in the Gulf of St. Lawrence.
Friendship	United Kingdom	The ship was wrecked on Willoughby's Point, United States.
Friendship	United Kingdom	The ship was wrecked on The Knoll, in the North Sea off the coast of Essex.
Grace	United Kingdom	The ship was lost off Goree, South Holland, Netherlands. She was on a voyage from Stockholm, Sweden to Rotterdam, South Holland.
Graces	United Kingdom	The ship was wrecked on Siskar Island. Her crew were rescued.
Haabet	Denmark	The ship was wrecked at Gothenburg. Her crew were rescued. She was on a voyage from Copenhagen to Bordeaux, Gironde, France.
Hartley	United Kingdom	The ship was driven ashore near Bridlington. She was later refloated.
Hector	United Kingdom	The ship was driven ashore between Drogheda, County Louth and Newry, County Down. She was on a voyage from Drogheda to Liverpool.
Hoffnung	Hamburg	The ship was severely damaged by ice near Nordfeld. She was on a voyage from Saint Petersburg to Hamburg.
Irmaos	Portugal	The ship was driven ashore and wrecked at Aberystwyth, Carmarthenshire, United Kingdom. Her crew were rescued. She was on a voyage from Oporto to Liverpool.
Jane	United Kingdom	The ship was lost in the Mediterranean Sea. She was on a voyage from Patras, Greece to Hull.
John	United Kingdom	The ship departed from Antwerp, Netherlands for Oporto, Portugal early in December. No further trace; presumed foundered with the loss of all hands.
Latona	United States	The ship was wrecked on the Nordvarder Sand, in the North Sea. She was on a voyage from Philadelphia, Pennsylvania, United States to Amsterdam, North Holland, Netherlands.
Leipsic	United Kingdom	The ship ran aground at Great Yarmouth, Norfolk in early December. She was on a voyage from Zante, United States of the Ionian Islands to Hull. Leipsic was refloated in late January 1816.
Liebe	Netherlands	The ship was lost near Schiermonnikoog, Friesland. She was on a voyage from "Rothenspicker" to Zaandam, North Holland.
Lion	United Kingdom	The ship was wrecked on the east coast of Trinidad in early December. Her crew were rescued. She was on a voyage from Trinidad to Demerara.
Lord Collingwood	United Kingdom	The ship was driven ashore and damaged on Unst, Shetland Islands. She was later refloated.
Lord Gambier	United Kingdom	The ship was driven ashore in Swanage Bay. She was later refloated.
Margaret and Jane	United Kingdom	The ship foundered in the North Sea off Hornsea, Yorkshire, United Kingdom. She was subsequently driven ashore and wrecked at Cowden, Yorkshire.
Murray	United States	The ship was driven ashore on Fire Island, New York. She was on a voyage from Málaga, Spain to New York City.
Neath Castle	United Kingdom	The sloop was driven ashore at Ramsgate, Kent. She was later refloated and brought into that port.
Prince of Waterloo	United Kingdom	The ship was driven ashore and wrecked on Great Cumbrae. She was on a voyage from Plymouth, Devon to Glasgow, Renfrewshire.
Providence	United Kingdom	The ship was driven ashore near Kioge, Denmark in early December. She was on a voyage from Narva, Russia to Hull.
Port Royal	United States	The ship was wrecked on Heneaga. She was on a voyage from New York, United States to Jamaica.
Rentant	Stralsund	The ship foundered in the Kattegat off Strömstad, Sweden. She was on a voyage from Liverpool to Stalsund.
Rose	United Kingdom	The ship was driven ashore at Peterhead. She was later refloated and taken into Peterhead.
Speedy	United Kingdom	The ship foundered in the Baltic Sea off Götaland, Sweden. Her crew were rescued. She was on a voyage from Saint Petersburg, Russia to Hull.
Success	United Kingdom	The ship ran aground between Copenhagen and Køge, Denmark. She was on a voyage from Pillau, Russia to Lisbon, Portugal.
Surprise	United Kingdom	The brig was wrecked on the coast of Africa with the loss of two of her fifteen crew.
Thomas Martin	United Kingdom	The ship was driven ashore on the Long Bull. She was later refloated.
Trader	United Kingdom	The ship was driven ashore at Douglas, Isle of Man.
Two Friends	United Kingdom	The ship was wrecked in the Atlantic Ocean before 10 December whilst on a voyage from Gibraltar to London.
Ville de Croisie	France	The ship ran aground near Rouen, Seine-Inférieure, France. She was on a voyage from Jersey, Channel Islands to Rouen. Ville de Croisie was later refloated and taken in to Rouen.
Unnamed	United Kingdom	The brig was driven ashore near Poole, Dorset. She was on a voyage from London to Poole.
13 unnamed vessels	Flags unknown	The ships were driven ashore in the Gulf of St Lawrence.
Five unnamed vessels	Flags unknown	The schooners were wrecked in the St. Lawrence River with the loss of more than 30 lives.
Four unnamed vessels	Flags unknown	The ships were wrecked near the mouth of the Tiber.
Unnamed	Stralsund	The ship sank off Strömstadt, Sweden. Her crew were rescued. She was on a voyage from Liverpool to Stralsund.

== Unknown date ==
List of shipwrecks: Unknown date in 1815
Ship	State	Description
Adamant	United Kingdom	The transport ship was lost in the St. Lawrence River.
African Triumph	United Kingdom	The ship was lost near Fort Apollonia, Africa, with the loss of a crew member.
Ann	United Kingdom	The brig foundered on a voyage from Sain Thomas, Virgin Islands to Portsmouth, Hampshire between 26 February and 8 April.
Argus	United States	The ship was wrecked in the Bahamas. She was on a voyage from Matanzas, Cuba to Baltimore, Maryland, United States.
Benjamin	United Kingdom	The ship was crushed by ice and sank in the Atlantic Ocean off St. John's, Newfoundland, British North America. Her crew were rescued.
Cameleon	United States	The ship was lost on Abaco. She was on a voyage from Norfolk, Virginia, to Havana, Cuba.
Clapham	United Kingdom	The whaler was destroyed by fire in the Greenland Sea.
Clifton	United Kingdom	The ship was wrecked on the coast of Newfoundland during the winter of 1814—15 with the loss of all but two of her crew. She was on a voyage from Miramichi, New Brunswick, British North America to Liverpool, Lancashire.
Commerce	United Kingdom	The ship was lost near St. John's, Newfoundland, with the loss of three of her crew. She was on a voyage from Falmouth, Cornwall to Newfoundland.
Cornelia	United Kingdom	The ship sprang a leak and was abandoned in the Atlantic Ocean. Her crew were rescued by Mars (United Kingdom). She was on a voyage from Liverpool to New York, United States.
USS Detroit	United States Navy	The brig was scuttled in Misery Bay, Lake Erie sometime in 1815. Refloated in the 1830s, repaired, and put in commercial service.
Elizabeth	United Kingdom	The ship was wrecked on Barbados. She was on a voyage from Sunderland, County Durham to Saint Vincent.
Elvington	United States	The ship foundered before 20 October. Her crew were rescued by Margaret (United Kingdom). Elvington was on a voyage from Liverpool to Boston, Massachusetts.
Fame	United Kingdom	The transport ship was lost in the St. Lawrence River.
General Durham	United Kingdom	The ship foundered off the West Indies. Her crew were rescued by Swallow (United Kingdom). General Durham was on a voyage from Guadeloupe to London.
Harmony	United Kingdom	The ship was crushed by ice and sunk in Conception Bay. She was on a voyage from Lisbon, Portugal to Newfoundland.
Harriet	(United Kingdom of Great Britain and Ireland) Bermuda	The schooner was wrecked in the Turks Islands. She was on a voyage from Bermuda to the Turks Islands.
Hercules	United Kingdom	The ship was wrecked on the Sunk Sand, in the North Sea off the coast of Essex in late September or early October. Her crew survived.
Hercules	United Kingdom	The ship foundered off Charleston, South Carolina, United States. She was on a voyage from Jamaica to the Bahamas and Charleston.
Higginson	United Kingdom	The ship struck a sunken rock 60 nautical miles (110 km) south of St. Andrews, New Brunswick, British North America, and was lost. She was on a voyage from St. Andrews to Demerara.
Incle	United Kingdom	The ship was wrecked in the Caicos Islands. She was on a voyage from Bermuda to Jamaica.
Jane	United Kingdom	The ship was wrecked in the Bay of Fundy. She was on a voyage from St. Andrews, New Brunswick, British North America to London.
Lady Shore	United Kingdom	The transport ship was lost in the St. Lawrence River.
USS Lawrence	United States Navy	The brig was scuttled in Misery Bay, Lake Erie in mid 1815. Refloated in September 1875, cut into sections and taken to Philadelphia, Pennsylvania, where she was exhibited during the U.S. Centennial International Exhibition of 1876. She was destroyed when the building burned down.
Liebre	Spain	The ship was lost off Cuba with the loss of all but three of her crew. She was on a voyage from Cádiz to Veracruz, Viceroyalty of New Granada.
Lily	United Kingdom	The ship was wrecked on the coast of Cuba. She was on a voyage from Guernsey, Channel Islands to Havana, Cuba.
Madona Turliani	Portugal	The ship was lost at Missolonghi, Greece. She was on a voyage from the Morea to Lisbon.
Magnet	United Kingdom	The ship was abandoned in the Atlantic Ocean. She was on a voyage from Lisbon to Newfoundland. Magnet was later towed in to Cape Broyle, Newfoundland.
Marina	United Kingdom	The ship was wrecked on an island west of Saint Thomas before 31 March.
Mayflower	United Kingdom	The ship was driven ashore on Langlade Island and severely damaged. She was on a voyage from Richibucto, New Brunswick to Harrington, Lower Canada. Mayflower was refloated after five weeks and taken into Harrington.
Minerva	United Kingdom	The ship was destroyed by fire off Gaspee, Lower Canada. She was on a voyage from Liverpool to Quebec City.
Morell	United States	The ship was wrecked on Langlee Island, Massachusetts, with the loss of two of her crew. She was on a voyage from Boston, Massachusetts, to Newfoundland.
Neptune	United Kingdom	The ship was lost in Placentia Bay, Newfoundland. She was on a voyage from the Clyde to Quebec City.
Neptune	United Kingdom	The ship foundered in the Atlantic Ocean (approximately 47°N 15°W). Her crew took to a boat; they were rescued four days later. She was on a voyage from Liverpool to Newfoundland.
Palermo	Spain	The ship sprang a leak and was abandoned by her crew whilst on a voyage from Chagres, Viceroyalty of New Granada to Kingston, Jamaica. She was subsequently discovered at sea by HMS Emulous (Royal Navy) and taken into Santa Martha, Viceroyalty of New Granada, where she sank.
Pearl	United Kingdom	The ship was wrecked on the coast of Cuba. Her crew were rescued. She was on a voyage from St. Andrews, Fife to Kingston, Jamaica.
Perseverance	United States	The ship caught fire in the Delaware River and was destroyed. She was on a voyage from Philadelphia, Pennsylvania to New Orleans, Louisiana.
USS Queen Charlotte	United States Navy	The brig was scuttled in Misery Bay, Lake Erie in mid 1815. Sold, refloated in 1825, and put in commercial service.
Robert and Mary	United Kingdom	The transport ship was lost in the St. Lawrence River.
Saragosa	United Kingdom	The transport ship was destroyed by fire at Quebec City.
Sceptre	United States	The ship was lost at New Providence, Bahamas. She was on a voyage from Philadelphia, Pennsylvania, to New Orleans, Louisiana.
St. Andrew	United States	The ship foundered in the Atlantic Ocean off the Virginia Capes. Her crew were rescued. She was on a voyage from Norfolk, Virginia, to Jamaica.
Sultana	United Kingdom	The transport ship was wrecked at Mobile, Alabama, United States.
Swallow	United Kingdom	The ship was wrecked on Trinidad.
Tres Coracoens	Portugal	The ship foundered in the Gulf of Mannar. Her crew were rescued. She was on a voyage from Lisbon to Bengal, India.
Urbano	United States	The ship was wrecked in the Turks Islands. Her crew were rescued. She was on a voyage from Jamaica to New York.
Innamed	Spanish Navy	The 74-gun ship was destroyed by an explosion at "Margaretta Island" with the loss of all hands.
