= Harriet (ship) =

Several vessels have been named Harriet, or Harriot:

- Harriot (1784 ship) was launched in 1784 on the Thames as a West Indiaman. Her owners may have intended to send her to the South Seas as a whaler in 1786, but there is no evidence that she actually made such a voyage. A new owner renamed her Dominica Packet around 1787. She then spent her career primarily sailing between Britain and the West Indies. During her career she captured a Dutch and a Spanish merchantman. A Baltimore privateer captured Dominica Packet in 1813, but the British Royal Navy quickly recaptured her. She foundered circa January 1821.
- Harriot (1786 ship) was launched in Liverpool. For many years she was a West Indiaman, sailing between Liverpool and Barbados. In 1796 a French frigate captured her, but the British Royal Navy quickly recaptured her. She became a slave ship. At the beginning of her of her first slave trading voyage a French privateer captured her, and again the Royal Navy quickly recaptured her. She made five slave trading voyages in all. Thereafter she traded with South America. She was last listed in 1814 with stale data.
- Harriot (1787 ship) was launched at Rotherhithe as a West Indiaman. She made two voyages for the British East India Company (EIC), the first as Harriot and the second as Harriet. After the voyages for the EIC she returned to sailing to the West Indies until circa 1801. She then became a London-based transport; she was last listed in 1813.
- Harriet (1795 ship) (or Harriett; pre-1808 Harriot) was launched at Calcutta, between 1793 and 1795. Between 1795 and 1801 she made three voyages for the British East India Company (EIC), and was chartered for use as a transport for a naval campaign that was cancelled. She became a transport and then in 1817 made another voyage to India, this time under a license from the EIC. She then became a whaler in the southern whale fishery, making seven complete whaling voyages and being lost c.1841 on her eighth.
- Harriot (1797 ship) (or Harriet) was launched in Spain in 1794, almost surely under another name, and taken in prize in 1797. She made two voyages as a London-based slave ship. Under new ownership, she then made three voyages as a whaler. A privateer captured her as she was returning from her third whale-hunting voyage but the British Royal Navy recaptured her. After her recapture she became a merchantman. She was captured and condemned at Lima, Peru in late 1809.
- Harriet (1798 ship) was launched at Pictou, Nova Scotia. She was the first large ship built in Nova Scotia;a little over a year later she was sold in London. She traded widely from London, primarily to North America. She foundered on 3 November 1818.
- Harriot (1799 ship), of 170 ton (bm), was built in France, probably under another name, and taken in prize circa 1799. A Spanish privateer captured her in 1801 as she was sailing from London to Demerara. She was then lost on the Spanish Main.
- Harriet (1802 EIC ship) was a two-decker East Indiaman. She made five complete voyages for the British East India Company (EIC), as an "extra ship" i.e., under charter, and accidentally burnt as she was preparing to return to England from her sixth voyage.
- Harriot (1803 ship) (or Harriet) was launched at Broadstairs. She made four voyages as a Guineaman (slave ship) between 1804 and 1807. Following the prohibition in 1807 on British vessels participating in the trans-Atlantic slave trade Harriet became a West Indiaman. A French privateer captured Harriet as Harriet was returning to England from Port au Prince in April 1809.
- Harriot (1806 ship) (or Harriet) was launched in America in 1803, possibly under another name. In 1806 she made a voyage as a slave ship. In 1807 she started a second such voyage, one of the last legal such voyages, but a French privateer captured her before she could deliver to the British West Indies the slaves she had acquired.
- Harriet (1809 ship) was built in Massachusetts and taken in prize prior to 13 January 1813. She became a West Indiaman, and also made one voyage to New South Wales. From 1818 on she made four complete voyages as a whaler in the British southern whale fishery. She was lost in October 1833 in the Seychelles on her fifth whaling voyage.
- Harriet (1810 ship) was launched at New York in 1810. She was captured and sold as a prize in 1813 to British owners. She then traded widely, eventually sailing primarily to New South Wales. She was wrecked at Fanning's Island in late 1831 or early 1832 while on a whaling voyage.
- Harriet (1829 ship) was a former vessel of the British Royal Navy, probably the Cruizer-class brig-sloop HMS Harrier. The Navy sold her in 1829 and her new owners deployed her as a whaler in the southern whale fishery. She made three complete whaling voyages and was lost in July 1837 while on her fourth.
- Harriet (1836 ship) was launched at Yarmouth. She burnt at Calcutta on 19 April 1842.
- Harriet (fishing smack) is an English fishing smack built in Fleetwood in 1893 which is now preserved at Fleetwood Museum.
