= Harriet =

Harriet(t) may refer to:

- Harriet (name), a female name (includes list of people with the name)

== Places ==
- Harriet, Queensland, rural locality in Australia
- Harriet, Arkansas, unincorporated community in the United States
- Harriett, Texas, unincorporated community in the United States

== Ships ==
- Harriet (1798 ship), built at Pictou Shipyard, Nova Scotia, Canada
- Harriet (1802 EIC ship), East India Company ship
- Harriet (1810 ship), American ship
- Harriet (1813 ship), American ship
- Harriet (1829 ship), British Royal Navy ship
- Harriet (1836 ship), British ship
- Harriet (fishing smack), 1893 British trawler preserved in Fleetwood Museum

== Other ==
- Harriet (band), an alternative Americana band from Los Angeles
- Harriet (film), a 2019 biographical film about Harriet Tubman
- Harriet (novel), a 1976 romance by Jilly Cooper
- Harriet (play), 1943 American play
- Harriet the Spy, 1964 children's novel by Louise Fitzhugh
- Harriet the Spy (TV series), a 2021 animated TV series
- Harriet (tortoise), a Galápagos tortoise who had an estimated life-span of 175 years
- List of storms named Harriet

== See also ==
- Harriot (disambiguation)
- Harry (disambiguation)
- Harriette
