= Westminster Cathedral Choir discography =

The discography of Westminster Cathedral Choir includes many award-winning recordings, among them the 1998 Gramophone Award Record of the Year for Frank Martin's Mass for Double Choir and Ildebrando Pizzetti's Requiem.

== Discography ==
=== George Malcolm (musician) ===
- Victoria: Tenebrae Responsories.

=== Stephen Cleobury ===
- Gregorian Chant from Westminster Cathedral

=== David Hill ===
- Britten: A Ceremony of Carols
- Palestrina: Missa Papae Marcelli & Missa brevis (CDA66266)
- Praetorius: Christmas Music' (CDH55446) with The Parley of Instruments
- Tomas Luis de Victoria: Ave maris stella & O quam gloriosum' (CDA66114)
- Victoria: Missa Vidi speciosam & other sacred music' (CDH55358)
- Victoria: O magnum mysterium & Ascendens Christus in altum' (CDA66190)
- Victoria: Requiem (CDA66250)
- Victoria: Tenebrae Responsories (CDA66304)

=== James O'Donnell (organist) ===
- Adeste fideles, carols including "Adeste fideles" (O come, all ye faithful) by John Francis Wade (CDA66668)
- Anerio: Requiem (CDH55213)
- Dupré, Louis Vierne & Widor: Choral Music
- Duruflé: Requiem & Messe cum jubilo (CDA66757)
- Exultate Deo (CDA66850)
- Francisco Guerrero:
  - Missa De la batalla escoutez & other works with His Majesty's Sagbutts & Cornetts
  - Missa Sancta et immaculata & other sacred music' (CDH55313)
- Janáček & Kodály: Masses (CDA67147)
- Josquin: Missa Pange lingua & other works (CDH55374)
- Lassus: Missa Bell' Amfitrit' altera (CDA66688) with His Majestys Sagbutts & Cornetts
- Frank Martin: Mass for Double Choir; Pizzetti: Messa di Requiem (CDA67017)
- Masterpieces of Mexican Polyphony (CDH55317)
- Masterpieces of Portuguese Polyphony (CDH55229)
- Cristóbal de Morales: Missa Queramus cum pastoribus & other sacred music (CDH55276)
- Mortuus est Philippus Rex including Missa Philippus Rex Hispaniae by Bartolomé de Escobedo (CDH55248)
- Palestrina:
  - Missa Aeterna Christi munera & other sacred music (CDH55368)
  - Missa De beata virgine & Missa Ave Maria (CDH55420)
  - Missa Ecce ego Johannes & other sacred music (CDH55407)
  - Missa O rex gloriae & Missa Viri Galilaei (CDH55335)
- Panis angelicus - motets by Mendelssohn, Rossini and others (CDA66669)
- Francisco de Peñalosa: Masses (CDH55326)
- Poulenc: Mass & Motets (CDH55448)
- Stravinsky: Mass & Symphony of Psalms (CDA66437) with City of London Sinfonia
- Victoria:
  - Missad dum complerentur & other sacred music (CDH55452)
  - Missa trahe me post te & other sacred music (CDH55376)

=== Martin Baker ===
- Byrd: The three Masses (CDA68038)
- Palestrina: Missa Hodie Christus natus est & other sacred music (CDH55367)
- Bingham & Vaughan Williams: Mass (CDA67503)
- Brahms & Rheinberger: Mass (CDA67559)
- Christmas Vespers at Westminster Cathedral (CDA67522)
- From the vaults of Westminster Cathedral (CDA67707)
- Langlais: Missa Salve regina & Messe solennelle (CDH55444)
- Alonso Lobo: Lamentations & other sacred music (CDA68106)
- MacMillan: Mass & other sacred music (CDA67219)
- MacMillan: Tenebrae Responsories & other choral works (CDA67970)
- Maxwell Davies: Mass & other choral works (CDA67454)
- Miserere - including Miserere mei, Deus by George Malcolm (1917-1997) (CDA67938)
- Palestrina: Lamentations (CDA67610)
- Palestrina: Missa Dum complerentur & other music for Whitsuntide (CDH55449)
- Palestrina: Missa Tu es Petrus & Missa Te Deum laudamus (CDA67785)
- Victoria: Ave regina caelorum & other sacred music (SACDA67479)
- Victoria: Missa De Beata Maria Virgine & Missa Surge propera' (CDA67891)
- Sheppard: Media vita & other sacred music (CDA68187)
- Sheppard: Music for Advent & Christmas (2003 Hyperion Records Limited)
