= Harriette =

Harriette is a given name. Notable people with the name include:

- Harriette Beanland (1866–1922), British textile worker and suffragette
- Harriette Chick (1875–1977), British protein scientist and nutritionist
- Harriette Cole (born 1961), writer and columnist who works for the New York Daily News
- Harriette A. Keyser (1841-1936), American industrial reformer and author
- Harriette Deborah Lacy (1807–1874), English actress born in London
- Harriette Moore (1902–1952), African-American teacher and civil rights worker
- Harriette Newell Woods Baker (1815–1893), prolific American author of books for children
- Harriette Merrick Plunkett (1826–1906), American sanitary reform leader
- Harriette Simpson Arnow (1908–1986), American novelist, claimed by both Kentucky and Michigan as a native daughter
- Harriette Smythies (1813-1883), English novelist and poet
- Harriette Tarler (1920–2001), American film actress
- Harriette Walters served as a tax assessments manager for the District of Columbia
- Harriette Wilson (1786–1845), celebrated British Regency courtesan
- Harriette Winslow (born 1950), actress on the show Perfect Strangers and the ABC/CBS series of Family Matters

== See also ==
- Harriet
