= List of shipwrecks in April 1842 =

The list of shipwrecks in April 1842 includes ships sunk, foundered, wrecked, grounded, or otherwise lost during April 1842.

== 1 April ==
List of shipwrecks: 1 April 1842
Ship	State	Description
Cambria	United Kingdom	The whaler was driven ashore on Tahiti. She was later refloated.
Drie Gebroeders	Netherlands	The ship was wrecked off Egmond aan Zee, North Holland. Her crew were rescued. She was on a voyage from Surinam to Amsterdam, North Holland.
Georgia	United Kingdom	The East Indiaman was destroyed by fire in the Indian Ocean 800 to 900 nautical miles (1,500 to 1,700 km) off Madagascar with the loss of five of her fifteen crew. Survivors were rescued by Thomas Sparks (United Kingdom). Georgia was on a voyage from Calcutta, India, to London.
Hope	United Kingdom	The ship ran aground in the Sound of Sanda.
USS Missouri	United States Navy	The steam frigate ran aground in the Port Tobacco River at Port Tobacco, Maryland. She was refloated with assistance from USS Mississippi (United States Navy).
Santa Barbara	Spain	The ship foundered in the Atlantic Ocean off Cape Finisterre. Her crew were rescued by Mellish (United Kingdom). Santa Barbara was on a voyage from Santa Cruz de Tenerife, Canary Islands, to London, United Kingdom.

== 2 April ==
List of shipwrecks: 2 April 1842
Ship	State	Description
Agnes	United Kingdom	The ship capsized and sank off St. Agnes, Cornwall. Her crew were rescued. She was on a voyage from Grangemouth, Stirlingshire, to Newport, Monmouthshire.
Astrea	United Kingdom	The smack capsized in the Bristol Channel. Her crew were rescued by the brig Joe (United Kingdom). She was on a voyage from Dundalk, County Louth, to Newport, Monmouthshire.
Confidenz	Denmark	The brig was wrecked at the mouth of the Cotinguiba River.
Elizabeth	United Kingdom	The ship was driven ashore at Sharpness, Gloucestershire. She was on a voyage from Gloucester to Newfoundland, British North America.
Great Britain	United Kingdom	The ship ran aground on the West Reef, off Green Island in the Saint Lawrence River and was damaged. She was on a voyage from London to Montreal, Province of Canada, British North America. Great Britain was refloated on 11 July and taken into "Diamond harbour".
Maria Catharina	Denmark	The schooner was wrecked at the mouth of the Cotinguiba River.
Seaforth	United Kingdom	The ship ran aground at South Shields, County Durham, and was wrecked. Her crew were rescued by the South Shields Lifeboat. She was on a voyage from Sunderland, County Durham, to Inverness. The wreck was destroyed by fire that day due to her cargo of quicklime getting wet.
Victoria	United Kingdom	The ship sprang a leak and put into Hartlepool, County Durham. She was set afire when her cargo of quicklime reacted with water and was destroyed. She was on a voyage from Sunderland to Aberdeen.

== 3 April ==
List of shipwrecks: 3 April 1842
Ship	State	Description
Matchless	United Kingdom	The ship was driven ashore by ice in the Bay of Casperwick. She was on a voyage from Laguna to Saint Petersburg, Russia. She was refloatedon 8 April and taken into Reval, Russia.
Romp	Hamburg	The ship ran aground between Norderoog and Süderoog, Duchy of Holstein. She was on a voyage from Newcastle upon Tyne, Northumberland, United Kingdom, to Hamburg. Romp was refloated.
Victoria	United Kingdom	The ship was caught fire off Hartlepool, County Durham, and was wrecked. She was on a voyage from Sunderland, County Durham, to Aberdeen.

== 4 April ==
List of shipwrecks: 4 April 1842
Ship	State	Description
Economy	United Kingdom	The ship sprang a leak and was beached at Harwich, Essex. She was on a voyage from Boulogne, Pas-de-Calais, France to Newcastle upon Tyne, Northumberland.

== 5 April ==
List of shipwrecks: 5 April 1842
Ship	State	Description
Rapid	(United Kingdom of Great Britain and Ireland) Saint Vincent	The schooner was driven ashore and wrecked in Union Bay.
Severn	United Kingdom	The steamship ran aground on the Woolpack Sand, in the North Sea. She was on a voyage from Hamburg to Hull, Yorkshire.

== 6 April ==
List of shipwrecks: 6 April 1842
Ship	State	Description
Scotland	United Kingdom	The ship ran aground in the River Ehen at Egremont, Cumberland. She was on a voyage from Liverpool, Lancashire, to New York, United States. She was refloated the next day and resumed her voyage.

== 7 April ==
List of shipwrecks: 7 April 1842
Ship	State	Description
Brunswick	United Kingdom	The ship was wrecked on the Sunk Sand, in the North Sea off the coast of Suffolk. Her crew were rescued by the smack Good Agreement (United Kingdom). She was on a voyage from Hull, Yorkshire, to London.
Independiente	Spain	The ship ran aground on the West Rocks, off Harwich, Essex, United Kingdom. She was refloated and taken into the River Colne with assistance from HMRC Desmond ( Board of Customs), the smacks Aurora Increase, Celerity and Friend's Goodwill and the steamship Brocklebank (all United Kingdom). Independiente was on a voyage from Hamburg to Havana, Cuba. She was subsequently taken into Wivenhoe, Essex, for repairs.
Lady Raffles	United Kingdom	The ship caught fire at Sydney, New South Wales and was scuttled. She was refloated on 30 April and put under repair.
Leonora	Texas	The sloop was wrecked at the mouth of the Brazos River.
Palmetto	United States	The ship ran aground and was wrecked off the Cove Point Lighthouse, Maryland. She was on a voyage from Baltimore, Maryland, to Halifax, Nova Scotia, British North America.
William Walker	United Kingdom	The ship foundered in the Atlantic Ocean. Her crew survived. She was on a voyage from Gloucester to Quebec City, Province of Canada, British North America.

== 8 April ==
List of shipwrecks: 8 April 1842
Ship	State	Description
Jane	(United Kingdom of Great Britain and Ireland) Jersey	The cutter struck a rock and foundered in Granville Bay, Manche, France. Her crew were rescued.
Maria	United States	The ship was abandoned in the Atlantic Ocean. All seven people on board were rescued by Hebe (United Kingdom). Maria was on a voyage from New Orleans, Louisiana, to Jamaica.

== 9 April ==
List of shipwrecks: 9 April 1842
Ship	State	Description
Volunteer	United Kingdom	The ship was abandoned in the Atlantic Ocean. Her crew were rescued by Ann Martin (United Kingdom). Volunteer was on a voyage from Sierra Leone to Cork.

== 10 April ==
List of shipwrecks: 10 April 1842
Ship	State	Description
Racehorse	United Kingdom	The ship was driven ashore in the Dardanelles.

== 11 April ==
List of shipwrecks: 11 April 1842
Ship	State	Description
Casimir	France	The ship departed from South Shields, County Durham, United Kingdom, for Marseille, Bouches-du-Rhône. No further trace, presumed foundered with the loss of all hands.
Duchess of Sutherland	United Kingdom	The paddle steamer ran aground on the Nore. Her passengers were transferred to another ship. She was on a voyage from Aberdeen to London. Duchess of Sutherland was refloated on 18 April and taken into London.
Hoop	Netherlands	The ship was driven ashore on Langeoog, Kingdom of Hanover. Her crew were rescued. She was on a voyage from the Friesland Channel to the Eider.
Isabella and Jane	United Kingdom	The ship was sighted in the Pentland Firth whilst on a voyage from Sunderland, County Durham, to Newhaven, Connecticut, United States. No further trace, presumed foundered with the loss of all hands.
Scotia	United Kingdom	The ship was driven ashore near Coleraine, County Antrim.

== 12 April ==
List of shipwrecks: 12 April 1842
Ship	State	Description
Countess of Westmoreland	United Kingdom	The brig ran aground on the Lemon Sand, in the North Sea. She was on a voyage from Great Yarmouth, Norfolk, to Alexandria, Egypt. She was refloated and was escorted into Harwich, Essex, in a leaky condition.

== 13 April ==
List of shipwrecks: 13 April 1842
Ship	State	Description
Admiraal Zoutman	Netherlands	The ship was driven ashore on Schoolhoek Point, Zeeland. She was refloated and taken into the New Channel.
Caroline	United Kingdom	The ship ran aground on the Herd Sand, in the North Sea off the coast of County Durham. She was on a voyage from Amsterdam, North Holland, Netherlands, to South Shields, County Durham. She was refloated and taken into South Shields.
Confidence	United Kingdom	The smack was wrecked on the Gunfleet Sand, in the North Sea off the coast of Essex. Her crew were rescued.
Despatch	(United Kingdom of Great Britain and Ireland) Antigua	The ship was lost in the Bird Island Channel.
Stormont	United Kingdom	The ship was lost in the Bay of Honduras. Her crew were rescued.

== 14 April ==
List of shipwrecks: 14 April 1842
Ship	State	Description
Beulah	United Kingdom	The troopship, a full-rigged ship, was driven ashore and damaged at Dungeness, Kent. Her crew and 270 troops of the 29th Regiment survived. She was on a voyage from London to Bengal, India. Beulah was refloated on 23 April and taken into Gravesend, Kent.
Louise Philippe	France	The ship was driven ashore and damaged on Long Island, New York, United States. All on board, over 100 people, were rescued. She was on a voyage from Havre de Grâce, Seine-Inférieure, to New York City, United States. She was refloated on 4 May and towed into New York City.
Medora	United States	The steamboat suffered a boiler explosion and sank in the Chesapeake River at Baltimore, Maryland, with the loss of 23 lives. About 40 people were injured.
Philadelphia	United States	The steamship was wrecked at the mouth of the Brazos River.
Provincie Groningen	Netherlands	The ship capsized at Amsterdam, North Holland.

== 15 April ==
List of shipwrecks: 15 April 1842
Ship	State	Description
Billow	(United Kingdom of Great Britain and Ireland) British North America	The ship was wrecked at "Little Causo". She was on a voyage from Guysboro, Nova Scotia, to Halifax, Nova Scotia.

== 16 April ==
List of shipwrecks: 16 April 1842
Ship	State	Description
Coquette	United Kingdom	The barque was wrecked on Heneagua, Bahamas. All on board were rescued. She was on a voyage from Jamaica to Liverpool, Lancashire.
Dovecot	United Kingdom	The brig was sighted in the Straits of Gaspar whilst on a voyage from London to China. Subsequently wrecked on Hainan; her crew may have been murdered by pirates.
Edward	United Kingdom	The ship was driven ashore and wrecked in Gurnet Bay, Isle of Wight. She was on a voyage from Rouen, Seine-Inférieure, France to Newcastle upon Tyne, Northumberland.
Stad Colberg	Kolberg	The ship was driven ashore and scuttled at Danzig. She was on a voyage from Dajtsic to Cherbourg, Seine-Inférieure, France. Stad Colberg was refloated on 21 April and taken into Danzig.

== 17 April ==
List of shipwrecks: 17 April 1842
Ship	State	Description
Ann and Jane	United Kingdom	The ship driven ashore at Margate, Kent. She was on a voyage from Liverpool, Lancashire, to London. She was refloated and towed into Ramsgate, Kent.
Jane	United Kingdom	The ship was driven ashore near Dunkirk, Nord. She was on a voyage from Stockton-on-Tees, County Durham, to Dunkirk. Jane was refloated and taken into Dunkirk.
Mercator	Norway	The ship was driven ashore on Neuwerk. She was refloated the next day and taken into Cuxhaven.
Prince Oscar	United Kingdom	The ship was driven ashore and wrecked at Popo, Kingdom of Dahomey. Her crew were rescued.

== 18 April ==
List of shipwrecks: 18 April 1842
Ship	State	Description
George	United Kingdom	The ship ran aground on the Diamond Reef, off the coast of Antigua. She was later refloated.
Helene	Denmark	The ship ran aground on the Buxey Sand, in the North Sea off the coast of Suffolk, United Kingdom. She was on a voyage from Christiana to Saint-Valery-sur-Somme, France. She was refloated and taken into Wivenhoe, Essex, United Kingdom.
Normahul	United Kingdom	The ship departed from Launceston, Van Diemen's Land. No further trace, presumed foundered with the loss of all hands.

== 19 April ==
List of shipwrecks: 19 April 1842
Ship	State	Description
Foxhound	United Kingdom	The ship ran aground on the Grain Spit, in the Thames Estuary off the Isle of Grain, Kent.
Hadrika	Norway	The ship ran aground off Seacombe, Cheshire, United Kingdom.
Harriet	United Kingdom	The ship caught fire and exploded at Calcutta, India, on 19 April.
HMS Investigator	United Kingdom	The police ship, a brig, sprang a leak and sank in the River Thames at Somerset House, London. All seven police officers on board were rescued.

== 20 April ==
List of shipwrecks: 20 April 1842
Ship	State	Description
Meanwell	United Kingdom	The ship was driven ashore on Tenedos, Ottoman Empire.
Mercator	United Kingdom	The barque ran aground and was wrecked in the Little River. She was on a voyage from Windsor, Nova Scotia, British North America, to Boston, Massachusetts, United States.

== 21 April ==
List of shipwrecks: 21 April 1842
Ship	State	Description
Andrew	United Kingdom	The ship was wrecked on Attwood's Key. Her crew were rescued. She was on a voyage from Port au Prince, Haiti, to London.
Emporium	United Kingdom	The brig was driven ashore by ice on the Gute Bullen, near Bolderāja, Russia.
Helvetia	Norway	The schooner was driven ashore by ice on the Gute Bullen.
James	United Kingdom	The brig was driven ashore by ice on the Gute Bullen.
Marys	(United Kingdom of Great Britain and Ireland) South Australia	The ship ran aground at Adelaide.
St. James	United Kingdom	The brig departed from the Clyde for Quebec City, Province of Canada, British North America. No further trace, presumed foundered with the loss of all hands and 44 passengers.

== 22 April ==
List of shipwrecks: 22 April 1842
Ship	State	Description
Mary Gray	United Kingdom	The ship ran aground off Dragør, Denmark. She was on a voyage from Newcastle upon Tyne, Northumberland, to Stettin. She was refloated and put into Copenhagen, Denmark, for repairs.

== 23 April ==
List of shipwrecks: 23 April 1842
Ship	State	Description
Eliza and Susan	United States	The ship was driven ashore at "Tobasco". She was on a voyage from Tobasco to a European port.

== 24 April ==
List of shipwrecks: 24 April 1842
Ship	State	Description
Gem	(United Kingdom of Great Britain and Ireland) New South Wales	The whaling ship was driven ashore and wrecked in the Chatham Islands. All aboard were saved. Her crew were rescued.
Robertson	United Kingdom	The ship was driven ashore on Anglesey. She was on a voyage from Savannah, Georgia, to Liverpool, Lancashire. She was later refloated.

== 25 April ==
List of shipwrecks: 25 April 1842
Ship	State	Description
Glasgow	United Kingdom	The ship ran aground on the Upgang Rock of the coast of Yorkshire. She was on a voyage from Warkworth, Northumberland, to Calais, France. Glasgow was refloated and put into Whitby, Yorkshire.
Irene	United Kingdom	The ship was run aground at New York, United States. She was on a voyage from Halifax, Nova Scotia, British North America, to New York. She was later refloated and taken into New York in a leaky condition.

== 26 April ==
List of shipwrecks: 26 April 1842
Ship	State	Description
Stormont	United Kingdom	The ship was wrecked on the south east coast of Bonacas Island, Mosquito Shore.
Twins	United Kingdom	The ship was wrecked on the Nieuwe Sand, in the North Sea off the Dutch coast. Her crew were rescued. She was on a voyage from Sunderland, County Durham, to Dordrecht, South Holland.

== 27 April ==
List of shipwrecks: 27 April 1842
Ship	State	Description
Garyone	United Kingdom	The schooner was driven ashore and wrecked on Faial Island, Azores. Her crew were rescued. She was on a voyage from Mauritius to London.
Goliah	United Kingdom	The ship ran aground at New Orleans, Louisiana, United States.
Rosanna	United Kingdom	The ship ran aground near the Rock Lighthouse, Cheshire. She was on a voyage from Cork to Liverpool, Lancashire.

== 28 April ==
List of shipwrecks: 28 April 1842
Ship	State	Description
John and Mary	United Kingdom	The ship ran aground on the Nore. She was on a voyage from Newcastle upon Tyne, Northumberland, to London. She was refloated the next day and resumed her voyage.
Mary Stewart	(United Kingdom of Great Britain and Ireland) India	The ship foundered on this date.

== 29 April ==
List of shipwrecks: 29 April 1842
Ship	State	Description
Leon	France	The ship was wrecked in Bantry Bay with the loss of all hands.
Typhis	United Kingdom	The brig was driven ashore at Calais, France. She was on a voyage from Calais to Sunderland, County Durham. She was later refloated and put back to Calais.

== Unknown date ==
List of shipwrecks: Unknown date in April 1942
Ship	State	Description
Avon	(United Kingdom of Great Britain and Ireland) New South Wales	The ship and another vessel (name unknown) were wrecked at "Rottormar" (possibly Rotuma, Fiji).
Experiment	United Kingdom	The ship was driven ashore at Sand Head, Hampshire. She was on a voyage from Cardiff, Glamorgan, to Newcastle upon Tyne, Northumberland. She was refloated on 21 April and resumed her voyage.
Helen Mar	United Kingdom	The ship caught fire whilst on a voyage from Saint Andrews, New Brunswick, British North America, to Demerara, British Honduras. She put into the Little River, United States, where she was scuttled and consequently condemned.
Hope	United Kingdom	The ship was driven ashore on the coast of Kintyre, Argyllshire. She was refloated and put into Ayr, where she arrived on 18 April.
Louisa	United Kingdom	The ship was driven ashore at Ryde, Isle of Wight, before 14 April. She was refloated and resumed her voyage.
Lulworth	United Kingdom	The ship was wrecked on Bok Island, Madura Island, Spanish East Indies.
Uncertain	United Kingdom	The brig sank in Broad Bay, Orkney Islands. She was refloated in August 1843 and beached at Stornoway.
