= Thetis (1793 ship) =

History

Great Britain
- Builder: John & William Wells, Rotherhithe
- Launched: 8 August 1793
- Fate: Last listed 1842

General characteristics
- Tons burthen: 306, or 323, or 334 (bm)
- Armament: 1807: 6 × 6-pounder guns; 1815: 6 × 4-pounder guns

Thetis was launched in 1793 in Rotherhithe. She spent most of her career as a West Indiaman. She spent several years as a government transport, and then between 1830 and 1836 she made two voyages as a whaler in the Britishsouthern whale fisheryy. She returned to trading to the western hemisphere, and was last listed in 1842.

== Career ==
Thetis first appeared in Lloyd's Register (LR) in 1793.

| Year | Master | Owner | Trade | Source & notes |
|---|---|---|---|---|
| 1793 | Sparks | Long & Co. | London–Jamaica | LR |
| 1797 | Sparks; Lowry | Long & Co. | London–Jamaica | LR |
| 1804 | R.Lowry; Siver (or Sever, or Sever) | Long & Co. | London–Jamaica | LR |
| 1816 | W.C.Silver | Long & Co. | London–Jamaica | LR; thorough repair 1805 |
| 1819 | Denham; Boyes | Joad & Co. | London–Jamaica | LR; thorough repair 1805 & small repairs 1815 |
| 1821 | Boyes; Middleton | Joad & Co. | London–Jamaica | LR; small repairs 1815 |
| 1822 | Middleton; Williams | Joad & Co. | London–Jamaica | LR; small repairs 1815 |
| 1825 | J.Williams | Joad & Co. | London–CGH | LR; small repairs 1815 |
| 1826 | Rainbett; G.Clayton | J.Somes & Co. | Hull–Petersburg | LR; small repairs 1815 & 1825 |
| 1829 | G.Clayton; Gray | Somes & Co. | Cork–Barbados | LR; large repair 1827 & small repair 1829 |
| 1830 | Gray | Somes & Co. | London–South Seas | LR; large repair 1827 & small repair 1829 |

1st whaling voyage (1830–1832): Captain A.Gray (or Grey), sailed from England on 29 June 1830. Thetis was reported to have been on the Japan Grounds, and at Honolulu. She arrived back at England on 26 May 1832.

| Year | Master | Owner | Trade | Source & notes |
|---|---|---|---|---|
| 1832 | Gray; Apsey | Somes & Co. | London–South Seas | Register of Shipping; large repair 1827 & small repair 1829 |

2nd whaling voyage (1832–1836): Captain Apsey sailed from London on 16 October 1832. Thetis was reported at Bay of Islands (1833 and 1834), Honolulu (1834), Sunda Strait (1835), and Bay of Islands again (1835). She arrived back in London on 20 May 1836.

On or prior to her return, Somes sold Thetis. Aspey, after his return, went on to captain Harriet, another vessel that Somes owned, sailing her on a whaling voyage to New Zealand.

| Year | Master | Owner | Trade | Source & notes |
|---|---|---|---|---|
| 1836 | J.Apsey; Heweth | Mitcheson | London–Quebec; London–Barbados | LR |
| 1839 | Baker | Mitcheson | London–North America | LR |

== Fate ==
Last listed in 1842 with data unchanged since 1839.
