= Reliance (1815 ship) =

History

United Kingdom
- Owner: 1827:Daniel Bennett & Son
- Builder: Woodcock, Coringa, India
- Launched: 1815, or 1816
- Fate: Wrecked 18 December 1836

General characteristics
- Tons burthen: 347, or 34732/94 or 350 (bm)
- Length: 99 ft 1 in (30.2 m)
- Beam: 28 ft 9 in (8.8 m)

Reliance was launched at Coringa in 1815. She sailed east of the Cape of Good Hope until c.1827 when she sailed to England and assumed British registry. Once in Britain she sailed back and forth to Bengal under a license from the British East India Company (EIC). She also twice transported military convicts to New South Wales from Bengal. In 1832 Bennett sent Reliance on a whaling voyage to the Pacific. After she returned she sailed on a second whaling voyage, but this time to the Indian Ocean where she wrecked at the end of 1836.

== Career ==
In 1813 the EIC had lost its monopoly on the trade between India and Britain. British ships were then free to sail to India or the Indian Ocean under a license from the EIC. Even so, Reliance did not enter Lloyd's Register (LR) until 1827.

| Year | Master | Owner | Trade | Source |
|---|---|---|---|---|
| 1827 | C.Hays | Bennett | London–Calcutta | LR |

On a voyage from Calcutta via Isle de France, under the command of C.D Hayes, she departed on 25 November 1828, with merchandise, passengers and three military convicts. She arrived in Sydney on 22 January 1829. After returning to Calcutta, she returned to Sydney on 27 March 1829 with a number of military convicts.

| Year | Master | Owner | Trade | Source |
|---|---|---|---|---|
| 1832 | C.Hays; N.Cockle | Bennett | London–Calcutta | LR |
| 1833 | W.Cockle | Bennett | London–South Seas | LR |

In 1832 Captain Joseph Cockle sailed Reliance from London to engage in whaling in the Pacific on behalf of Bennett & Co. She returned on 9 December 1835 with 1829 barrels, or 400 casks of whale oil.

On this voyage she was in the Indian Ocean, visiting Reunion, Mahé, the Amirante Islands, the Mozambique Channel, the coast of Africa, Zanzibar, and Aldebra. On 1 June 1833 she was at Dabes Island, surveying the wreckage of Greenwich. On 30 August Reliance was in the Mozambique Channel where she spoke Harriet. Harriet reported that her master, Captain McLean, had died, and that the other officers and crew were refusing to obey Mr. Long as commander.

== Fate ==
Cockle sailed again from London on 8 March 1836, bound for the Indian Ocean.

On 18 December Reliance was wrecked on or foundered near Al Sawda (Soda) Island in the Curia Maria Islands, off the coast of Oman. Palinurus, a survey brig belonging to the Indian Navy, rescued the crew. No oil could be saved. The crew arrived at Bombay on 22 February 1837.
