= Harriot (1787 ship) =

History

Great Britain
- Name: Harriot/Harriet
- Builder: John Mackenzie, Rotherhithe (Note: Hackman apparently mixes up this Harriot with Harriet (1795 ship))
- Launched: 31 July 1787
- Fate: Last listed in 1813

General characteristics
- Tons burthen: 378 (bm)
- Length: 84 ft 6 in (25.8 m) (keel)
- Beam: 29 ft 0 in (8.8 m)
- Armament: 8 × 18-pounder carronades (1809)

Harriot was launched at Rotherhithe in 1787 as a West Indiaman. She made two voyages for the British East India Company (EIC), the first as Harriot and the second as Harriet. After the voyages for the EIC she returned to sailing to the West Indies until circa 1801. She then became a London-based transport until she was last listed in 1813.

== Career ==
Harriot first appeared in Lloyd's Register (LR) in 1787.

Year	Master	Owner	Trade	Source
1787	Campbell	Davidson	London–Jamaica	LR
1795	Campbell	Davidson	London–Jamaica	LR

1st EIC voyage (1794–1795): The EIC had Harriot measured and surveyed. Captain John Luard sailed from Portsmouth on 1 May 1794, bound for Bengal. Harriot reached Madras on 11 September and arrived at Calcutta on 3 November. Homeward bound, she was at Saugor on 9 January 1795, reached St Helena on 19 March, and arrived back at the Downs on 23 July. (Note: One contemporary source on EIC voyages showed Luard and Harriot returning on 28 March 1795. The same source had Luard sailing Georgiana from Portsmouth for Bengal on 23 January 1795.)

The EIC on 19 April 1794 appointed Luard captain of Georgiana, shortly before he sailed as captain of Harriet. EIC records imply that Georgiana made seven voyages for the company. However, EIC records only account for six. The missing voyage would have occurred at the time Luard was sailing Harriot.

Year	Master	Owner	Trade	Source
1796	Paterson	Muilman	London–Cape of Good Hope	LR

2nd EIC voyage (1796–1797): Captain Charles Patterson sailed from Portsmouth on 14 April 1796, bound for the Cape and St Helena. Harriet was at Simon's Bay on 29 July and Table Bay on 2 September. She reached St Helena on 8 November and arrived at Long Reach on 16 February 1797. On her return from the Cape, Harriet returned to trading with the West Indies.

Year	Master	Owner	Trade	Source
1797	Paterson; Pender	Muilman; Manning	London–Cape of Good Hope; London St Kitts	LR
1798	W.Pender; R.Brown	Muilman; Manning	London–St Kitts	LR
1801	Dixon	Manning	London transport	LR

Harriet was last listed in LR in 1807 with data unchanged since 1801. However, in 1809 she was listed in the Register of Shipping. (The RS for 1807 and 1808 either do not exist, or they exist but are not available on line.)

Year	Master	Owner	Trade	Source & notes
1809	Johnson; Robson	T.&R.Brown	London transport	RS; repair 1805 & good repair 1809
1813	Robson	T.&R.Brown	London transport	RS; good repair 1809

== Fate ==
Harriet was last listed in RS in 1813. The entry was annotated "See Supplement", but she did not appear in the supplementary pages, or in the 1814 volume.
