= Harriot (1803 ship) =

British ship in 1803; its travels and history

History

United Kingdom
- Name: Harriot, later Harriet
- Builder: Broadstairs
- Launched: 1803
- Captured: April 1809

General characteristics
- Tons burthen: 248, or 249 (bm)
- Complement: 1804: 30; 1806: 30
- Armament: 1804: 14 × 9-pounder guns; 1806: 14 × 9-pounder guns

Harriot (or Harriet) was launched at Broadstairs in 1803. She made four voyages between 1804 and 1807 as a Guineaman (slave ship) in the triangular trade in enslaved people. Following the prohibition in 1807 on British vessels participating in the trans-Atlantic slave trade Harriet became a West Indiaman. A French privateer captured Harriet in April 1809 as Harriet was returning to England from Port au Prince.

== Career ==
Harriot first appeared in Lloyd's Register in 1804.

1st voyage transporting enslaved people (1804): Captain James Clark acquired a letter of marque on 21 January 1804. He sailed from London on 2 February. Harriot acquired captives on the Gold Coast. She arrived at Suriname on 27 June 1804, with 260 captives. She sailed from Suriname on 13 August, and arrived back in London on 29 September.

Year	Master	Owner	Trade	Source
1804	J.Clark; Sutherland	Parry&Co.	London–Africa	LR

2nd voyage transporting enslaved people (1804–1805): Captain Stewart Sutherland sailed from London on 3 December 1804. She acquired captives at Accra and arrived at Demerara on 20 June 1805, with 273. She left Demerara on 24 July. At Demerara she had taken on part of the cargo of Rose, Mansfield, master. Rose had run aground and been condemned. Harriet brought her portion of the cargo to England. Harriot arrived back in London on 30 September.

Year	Master	Owner	Trade	Source
1806	Sutherland; J.Clark	Parr & Co. Lumley	London–West Indies	LR

3rd voyage transporting enslaved people (1806–1807): Captain James Clark acquired a letter of marque on 11 January 1806. He sailed from London on 22 January. Harriot acquired captives at Accra and Wiamba and arrived at Demerara on 9 July, with 275 captives. As Harriet was on her way back to England from Demerara, she ran onshore at Grenada and had to unload her cargo. Harriot arrived back in London on 27 January 1807.

Year	Master	Owner	Trade	Source
1807	J.Clark; Mitchelson	Lumley	London; London–West Indies	LR

4th voyage transporting enslaved people (1807–1808): The Act for the abolition of the slave trade had passed Parliament in March 1807, and took effect on 1 May 1807. However, Captain Mitchelson Harriot sailed from London on 23 March 1807, well before the deadline. Harriot acquired captives at Accra. She arrived at Barbados on 24 December, with 255 captives; there she landed 63. At some point Captain Jacob Williamson replaced Mitchelson. Harriot sailed on to Demerara with the remaining captives. She arrived back in London on 24 June 1808.

Year	Master	Owner	Trade	Source & notes
1808	Mitchelson	Lumley	London–West Indies	LR; damages repaired 1807
1809	P.Clark	Lumley	London–Barbados	LR; damages repaired 1807

== Fate ==
Friendship, Williams, arrived in London on 21 April 1809 from Hayti. She had sailed from Port-au-Prince on 4 March in company with Harriet, Clarke, master. They had parted on 20 April.

As Harriet was returning from Port-au-Prince in April, the French privateer Rodeur captured her and took her into Bayonne. (Note: At the time several French privateers were named Rôdeur. The actual captor remains to be identified.) The "English ship, of 280 tons, Coppered and Armed with 14 guns (14-pounders)," was carrying a valuable cargo of coffee and other goods. Rodeur took Harriet into Bayonne.
