= James O'Donnell (organist) =

British organist (born 1961)

James O'Donnell LVO KCSG
- Born: 15 August 1961 (age 64); Scotland
- Occupations: Organist; Harpsichordist; Choral conductor
- Organizations: Westminster Cathedral; Westminster Abbey; Royal Academy of Music; Royal College of Organists; Yale Institute of Sacred Music

James Anthony O'Donnell LVO KCSG (born 15 August 1961) is a British organist, choral conductor and academic teacher who has been a professor of organ at the Yale Institute of Sacred Music in Connecticut, United States, since 2023.

He previously served as Organist and Master of the Choristers at Westminster Abbey from 2000 to 2022, during which time he was responsible for the music at several royal and state functions, including the funeral of Queen Elizabeth The Queen Mother in 2002, the wedding of Prince William and Catherine Middleton in 2011, the service of thanksgiving for Prince Philip, Duke of Edinburgh, in 2022 and the state funeral of Queen Elizabeth II, also in 2022.

O'Donnell taught at the Royal Academy of Music in London from 1997 to 2004 and was president of the Royal College of Organists from 2011 to 2013.

== Early life and education ==
Born in Scotland, O'Donnell later moved to England, where he attended Westcliff High School for Boys in Essex before gaining a scholarship for organ and harpsichord at the Royal College of Music. He then studied at Cambridge University, where he was organ scholar at Jesus College. He studied with Peter Hurford, Nicolas Kynaston and David Sanger and graduated in 1982.

== Career ==
=== Westminster Cathedral ===
O'Donnell was appointed Assistant Master of Music at Westminster Cathedral in 1982, becoming Master of Music in 1988. During his tenure, the profile and international reputation of the cathedral choir increased. A 1998 recording of masses for choir a cappella by Frank Martin and Ildebrando Pizzetti received both the Record of the Year award from Gramophone and a Royal Philharmonic Society Music Award in 1999, which was unprecedented for a cathedral choir.

=== Westminster Abbey ===
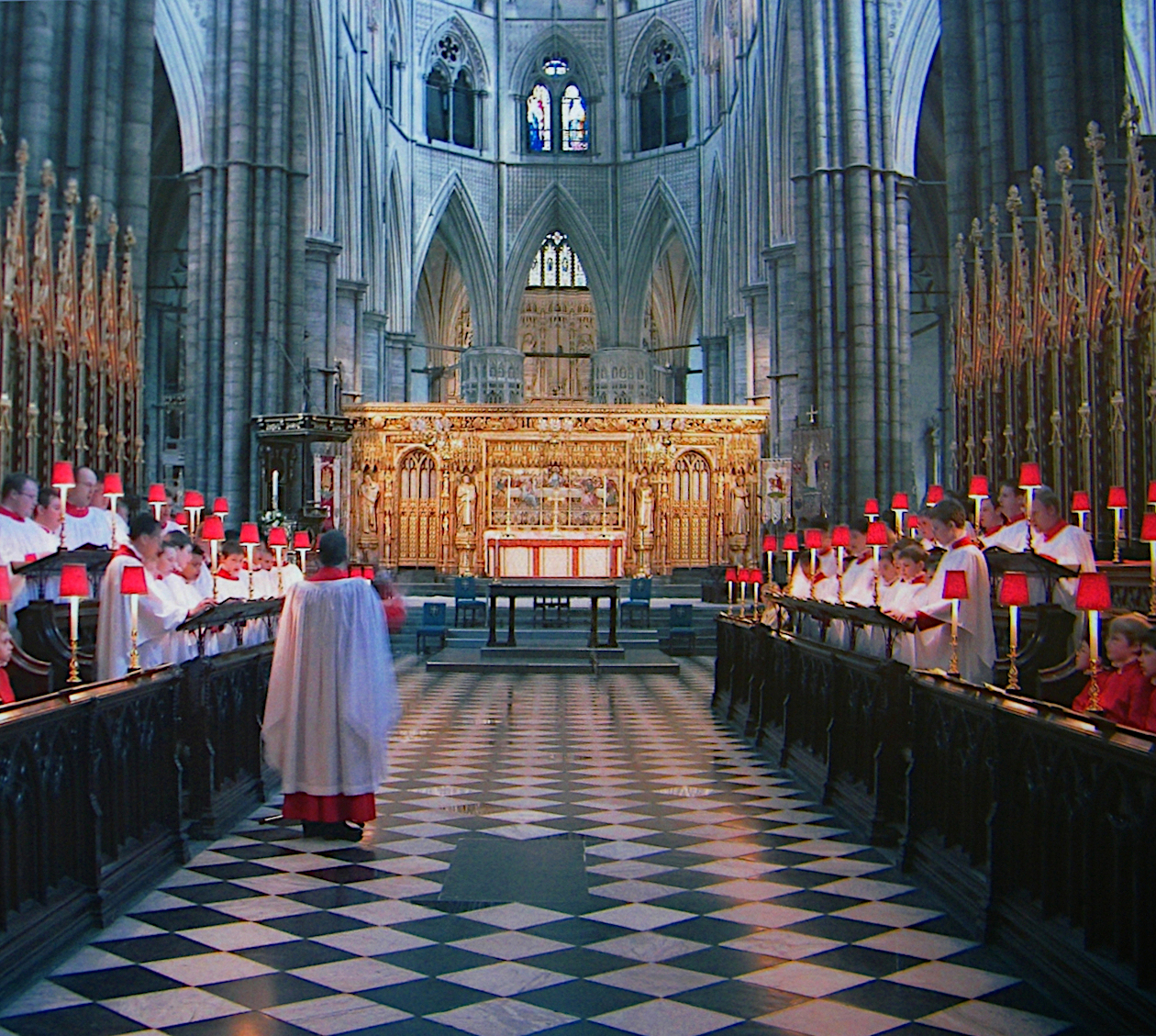
The choir of Westminster Abbey

In 2000 O'Donnell was appointed Organist and Master of the Choristers at Westminster Abbey, the first Catholic to be appointed to the nearly 500-year-old role. At the abbey he was responsible for the daily choral services, functions for special occasions, concerts, broadcasts, recordings and tours. With the abbey choir he travelled throughout Europe, the United States, Asia and Australia.

Among the occasions of national prominence for which O'Donnell led the music were the funeral of Queen Elizabeth The Queen Mother in 2002, the state visit by Pope Benedict XVI in 2010, the wedding of Prince William and Catherine Middleton in 2011 and the service of thanksgiving for Prince Philip, Duke of Edinburgh, in 2022. On 14 September 2022 he conducted his own choral setting of words from Psalm 139 (verses 1−18 and 23−24) for the reception of the Queen Elizabeth II's coffin at Westminster Hall, which was sung by the Choir of Westminster Abbey and the Choir of His Majesty's Chapel Royal. On 19 September he led the choir at the state funeral of Queen Elizabeth II at Westminster Abbey, including a new setting of "Like as the hart" by Judith Weir and a new anthem, "Who shall separate us?", by James MacMillan. His arrangement of Henry Purcell's Angularis Fundamentum was performed at the coronation of Charles III and Camilla in 2023.

O'Donnell's final service at Westminster Abbey was on Christmas Day 2022, after which he took up a teaching role at Yale University in the United States while also holding the position of organist emeritus at the abbey. In 2023 he was also appointed artist-in-residence at Christ Church in Greenwich, Connecticut.

=== Teaching and other positions ===
O'Donnell was professor of organ at the Royal Academy of Music from 1997 to 2004, and remains a visiting professor. and is currently a visiting professor of organ and choral conducting there.

He was artist-in-residence at the Yale School of Music in 2010 and in 2023 was appointed Professor in the Practice of Organ and Sacred Music at the Yale Institute of Sacred Music.

He served as President of the Royal College of Organists from 2011 to 2013.

== Concerts and recordings ==
In 1987 O'Donnell was awarded first prize in the Royal College of Organists Performer of the Year competition. He has since appeared as a concert organist around the world, including at the Meyerson Symphony Center in Dallas, the Walt Disney Concert Hall in Los Angeles and the Louise M. Davies Symphony Hall in San Francisco. He has played at festivals such as the BBC Proms at the Royal Albert Hall and as a soloist with the London Philharmonic Orchestra, including in a performance of Poulenc's Organ Concerto at the opening of the restored Royal Festival Hall, conducted by Yannick Nézet-Séguin. He has also performed as a soloist with the BBC National Orchestra of Wales and the Tokyo Philharmonic Orchestra. He appeared as a continuo player in concerts and recordings with period instrument ensembles, including The King's Consort and the Gabrieli Consort and Players. He conducted ensembles such as the Academy of Ancient Music, the Academy of St Martin in the Fields, the BBC Singers and The English Concert. He has also served as the music director of St James' Baroque, a period instrument ensemble based in London.

O'Donnell has made around 50 recordings as an organist and choral conductor, many of which were performed with the Westminster Cathedral Choir.

He was the organist for a 1993 recording of works by Camille Saint-Saëns, reissued in 2019, including the Requiem (Op. 54), the Third Symphony with organ (Op. 78) and the overture of La princesse jaune (Op. 30). The recording was performed by the London Philharmonic Orchestra and combined choirs from Hertfordshire, Harlow and East London, with soloists Tinuke Olafimihan, Catherine Wyn-Rogers, Anthony Roden and Simon Kirkbride, and was conducted by Geoffrey Simon.

Conducting the Westminster Cathedral Choir, O'Donnell recorded works by Maurice Duruflé in 1995, including the Requiem with organ and the Quatre Motets sur des thèmes grégoriens, Notre Père and Messe cum jubilo.

In 1998 O'Donnell conducted the Westminster Cathedral Choir in two major recordings of sacred works for a cappella choir, both composed in 1922: Martin's Mass for Double Choir and Pizzetti's Messa di Requiem. A reviewer from Hi-Fi News commented that the singers responded to their conductor "in inspirational fashion" and noted "choral singing of great security and immaculate tonal blend, ardent and full-throated in tuttis yet wonderfully serene too". On the same Hyperion Records CD O'Donnell conducted Pizzetti's De profundis dating from 1837 and played Martin's Passacaille for organ, composed in 1944. Robert Layton from Gramophone wrote that "it is a measure of James O'Donnell's achievement with Westminster Cathedral Choir that the gain in purity and beauty is at no time at the expense of depth and fervour. This is an altogether moving and eloquent performance, often quite thrilling and always satisfying".

In a 2014 live recording from the restored Royal Festival Hall, O'Donnell played both Poulenc's Organ Concerto and Saint-Saëns's Third Symphony with organ, with Nézet-Séguin conducting the London Philharmonic Orchestra. A reviewer noted that he played the organ with "sensitivity and spark".

In a 2014 recording entitled Music for Remembrance, O'Donnell combined Duruflé's Requiem, in the orchestral version, with choral works written in memory of those fallen in the World Wars, including Three Prayers of Dietrich Bonhoeffer set by Philip Moore and The peace that surpasseth understanding by John Tavener, performed by soloists Christine Rice and Roderick Williams, the Westminster Abbey Choir, the Britten Sinfonia and organist Robert Quinney; it was conducted by O'Donnell and recorded at Westminster Abbey. He said at a recording session: "I spend my life working against the clock, and people don't make good music if they're under pressure. If you stay calm it gives everyone a sporting chance of getting on with it".

== Honours and awards ==
O'Donnell was awarded the title of Knight Commander of the Order of St Gregory the Great (KCSG) by Pope John Paul II in 1999 on his retirement from Westminster Cathedral.

He is a Fellow of the Royal School of Church Music (FRSCM), a Fellow of the Royal College of Music (FRCM) and an honorary member of the Royal Academy of Music (HonRAM). He became an honorary fellow of Jesus College, Cambridge, in 2011, and in 2013 he received an honorary doctorate from the University of Aberdeen.

O'Donnell was appointed Lieutenant of the Royal Victorian Order (LVO) by Charles III in the 2023 New Year Honours.

Cultural offices
Preceded by Martin Baker (acting)	Organist and master of the choristers of Westminster Abbey; 2000–2022	Succeeded by Andrew Nethsingha
