= Hariot =

Hariot may refer to:

- Hariot Glacier, Antarctica
- Paul Auguste Hariot (1854-1917), French pharmacist and phycologist
- Thomas Harriot or Hariot (1560-1621), English astronomer, mathematician, ethnographer and translator
- Hariot Hamilton-Temple-Blackwood, Marchioness of Dufferin and Ava (1843-1936), British peeress, "diplomatic wife", and promoter of improved medical care for women in British India.

== See also ==
- Harriot (disambiguation)
- Heriot
