= Jane Weld =

- Born: Jane Charlotte Gordon (bapt) 1806; Purley on Thames
- Died: 24 November 1871; Ostend
- Occupation: benefactor

Jane Charlotte Weld aka "Baroness Weld" born Jane Charlotte Gordon ((bapt) 1806 – 24 November 1871) was a British convert to Roman Catholicism and benefactor.

== Life ==
Weld was born in Purley on Thames and she was baptised on 10 August 1806 at Sunnyhill. Her parents were Jane Gordon (née Halliday) and Edward Lesmoir Gordon, a Sergeant-at-Arms. Smythie had four siblings, including a sister Harriette who became a writer and a brother, Edward, who was Sergeant-at-Arms at the coronation of Queen Victoria in 1838. Her father abandoned his family and went to France to avoid his debts. Her mother arranged for her to be educated at home until she was sixteen. At this point she was sent to a Roman Catholic school which is unexplained.

Before she was legally mature she married a leading Roman Catholic solicitor named William Weld. In time after some thought and eleven years of matrimony she converted to Roman Catholicism. She had taken advice and listened to lectures by Nicholas Wiseman.

In 1843 when they were abroad her husband did a small favour for the grand duke of Tuscany and he made him a baron. Weld took the title Baroness and used it from then on.

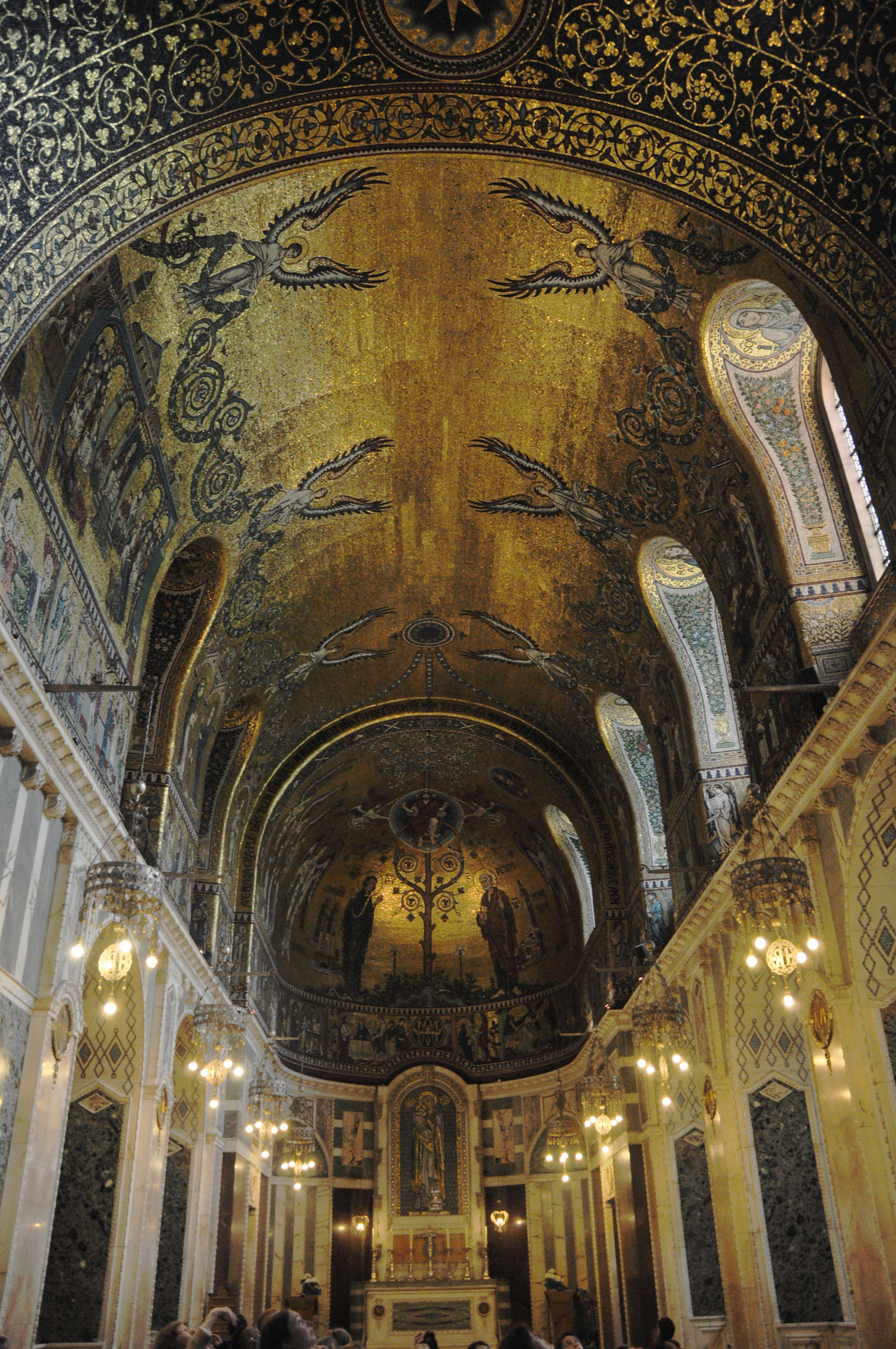
Westminster Cathedral's Lady Chapel

After her second marriage to a London Anglican lawyer, John Frederic Winterbottom, she lived in Westminster. Wiseman became her friend and she became a source of money for his ideas, and after he died in 1865 she transferred her loyalty to Henry Edward Manning. When Winterbottom died she had a memorial chapel built for him at St Thomas' church in East Woodhay. The design may be by Pugin who was her favourite architect. She was involved with the plans for Westminster Cathedral and the building of the Lady Chapel was funded by Weld in memory of her son Gordon Samuel Weld who had been born in 1829 and who died in 1863. The cost was £11,000.

Baroness Weld was also a patron of the St Georges, Marylebone and Catholic Lying-in Charity which was founded in 1842. The charity provided linen and then shillings to pregnant women with nowhere else to go.

== Death and legacies ==
Weld died in Ostend in 1871. She left the large fortune to charity and she gave small annuities to her mother and her unmarried sister Elizabeth Matilda Gordon. Her mother and sister tried unsuccessfully to appeal the will. Her other sister Harriette was estranged from her husband who had abandoned her and his parish and she was suing him for separation. Harriet's husband used the court case about the will to establish a motive for her request for the marriage to be separated. This caused her to abandon the case.
