= Rodeur (French privateer) =

Several French privateers have borne the name Rôdeur, French for "lurker":

- Rôdeur: from Calais commissioned in February 1807 under Captain Fourmentin. First cruise under Fourmentin from February 1807 to May 1807. Second under Jacques Sauvage of Boulogne from September 1808 to December 1809. Captured on 9 December 1809. (Note: Demerliac notes that HMS Seine captured a privateer brig on 25 October 1809). On 26 October 1809, Seine, Captain Atkins, captured the French privateer brig Rodeur of sixteen 6-pounder guns (pierced for 20), and 121 men off Bordeaux. Rodeur was three days out of Bayonne, had not captured anything, but was on her way to cruise off the west coast of Ireland. She arrived at Plymouth on 29 October.
- Rôdeur: from Boulogne commissioned in March 1807. First cruise under François Le Fort with 54 men and 24 guns (fourteen 4-pounders and ten 3-pounders) from March 1807 to later in 1807; second with Jean-Gabriel Huret from December 1807 to November 1808; third under Joseph Huret from 1809 to November 1809.
- Rôdeur: from Boulogne, commissioned under a Captain Huret in March 1810, first cruise from March to May 1810.
- Rôdeur: from Dieppe, commissioned in August 1809 under Louis Piquendaire, captured by the British in 1810 (around June).
- Rôdeur: from Saint-Vaast La Hougue, commissioned in March 1807.
- Rôdeur: from Saint-Malo, commissioned in October 1813 under Benjamin Dupont with 85 men and 8 guns. Returned to Saint-Malo on 9 April 1814.
- Rôdeur: from Bordeaux commissioned in 1809 under a Captain Marrauli with 102 men. Another cruise under a Captain Lagarigue from 1810 until February 1811. One French author described Rôdeur as amongst the most intrepid and fortunate privateers to sail the ocean in this era. (Note: "...parmi les plus intrépides et les plus heureux corsaires qui à cette époque sillonnaient l'Océan.")
- Rôdeur n°2: from Bordeaux commissioned in 1810 under a P.A. Marraud with 60 men and 14 guns. (Note: Demereliac identifies her as the vessel HMS Royalist captured on 19 December 1811. (See below).)
- Rôdeur: from Bayonne, commissioned in June 1813.
- Rôdeur: active in the North Sea from June 1811 to 1812.

== Also ==
- Grand Rôdeur: privateer from Boulogne, commissioned in November 1809 under Jean-Gabriel Huret with 90 men and 16 guns. On 9 December HMS Redpole captured Grand Rodeur, of 16 guns and 80 men under the command of Captain Huret. This may have been the Rôdeur above first commissioned at Boulogne in March 1807 and renamed formally or informally to distinguish her from other vessels by the same name.
- Petit Rôdeur: privateer from Boulogne commissioned in September 1811 under Jean-Gabriel Huret. HMS Royalist captured her on 19 December 1811. The letter by Royalist's captain describing the capture refers to her as Rôdeur. However, the name Petit Rôdeur may have been informal and used to distinguish her from the earlier Grand Rôdeur. She also may earlier have been Rôdeur n°2.
