= Harriette Smythies =

English novelist and poet (1813–1883)

Harriette Smythies aka Mrs. Gordon Smythies born Harriet Maria Gordon, (1813–1883, aged 69), was an English novelist and poet. She was a prolific writer of sensation novels, publishing 20 books between 1838 and 1875, some under the name "Mrs. Gordon Smythies".

== Life ==
Smythies may have been born Harriet Maria Gordon in 1813 however there are other sources that suggest dates varying from 1809 to 1817. She was born to an aristocratic military family in Margate, Kent. Her parents were Jane Gordon (née Halliday) and Edward Lesmoir Gordon, a Sergeant-at-Arms. Smythie had four siblings, including a sister Jane who was a noted benefactor and a brother, Edward, who was Sergeant-at-Arms at the coronation of Queen Victoria in 1838.

Smythies married Reverend William Yorick Smythies (1816-1910).

Smythies's works were published primarily by Richard Bentley, Thomas Cautley Newby, and Hurst and Blackett, sometimes under the name "Mrs. Gordon Smythies." Many of her novels involve themes of love and marriage.

In 1871 her sister Jane Weld died leaving a large fortune to charity and small annuities to their mother and their sister Elizabeth Matilda Gordon. Her mother and sister tried unsuccessfully to appeal the will. Harriette was suing her husband for separation since he had left her and their parish behind. Her husband used the court case about her sister's will to establish a motive for her request for the marriage to be separated. This caused her to abandon the case and she remained actually but not legally separated from her husband until she died in 1883. Her only child was the barrister William Gordon Smythies who also became a writer.

== Bibliography ==
=== Poetry ===
- The Bride of Siena (poem, 1835)

=== Novels ===
- Fitzherbert: or, Lovers and Fortune-Hunters (1838)
- Cousin Geoffrey: The Old Bachelor, A Novel (1840)
- The Marrying Man (1841)
- The Matchmaker: A Novel (1842)
- The Jilt: A Novel (1844)
- Breach of Promise (1845)
- The Life of a Beauty: A Novel (1846)
- A Warning to Wives: or, The Platonic Lover (1847)
- Courtship and Wedlock (1850)
- The Bride Elect (1852)
- Married for Love (1857)
- A Lover's Quarrel: or, The County Ball (1858)
- Hope Evermore: or, Something to Do (1860)
- Alone in the World: A Novel (1861)
- The Daily Governess: or, Self Dependence (1861)
- True to the Last: A Novel (1864)
- A Faithful Woman (1865)
- Idols of Clay: A Novel (1867)
- Acquitted: A Novel (1870)
- Eva's Fortune (1875)
