= Harriot =

Harriot may refer to:

- Elizabeth (Harriot) Wilson (1762–1786), figure in the folklore of southeastern Pennsylvania, hanged for murdering her children
- Harriot (crater), lunar crater on the far side of the Moon
- Harriot (planet), an exoplanet also known as 55 Cancri f
- Harriot Curtis (1881–1974), American golf champion and an early participant in the sport of skiing
- Harriot Eaton Stanton Blatch (1856–1940), American writer and suffragist, daughter of Elizabeth Cady Stanton
- Harriot Kezia Hunt (1805–1875), early female physician
- Thomas Harriot (1560–1621), English astronomer, mathematician, ethnographer, and translator

== See also ==
- Hariot (disambiguation)
- Cromer Lifeboat Harriot Dixon ON 770, lifeboat, stationed at Cromer in the county of Norfolk in 1934
- Thomas Harriot College of Arts and Sciences, the liberal arts college at East Carolina University
