= Martin Baker (organist) =

- Born: 26 July 1967 (age 57); Manchester, England
- Genres: Choral music
- Occupation(s): Organist, choral conductor
- Instrument: Organ
- Years active: 1993–present

Martin Baker (born 26 July 1967, Manchester) is a British organist and choir director. He was the president of the Royal College of Organists, and from 2000 until 2019 the Master of Music at Westminster Cathedral.

Baker was educated at the Royal Northern College of Music Junior School in Manchester, Chetham's School of Music also in Manchester, St Ambrose College in Hale Barns, and attended Downing College, Cambridge as an organ scholar from 1985–88. He held appointments at Westminster Cathedral (organ scholar 1988–90), St Paul's Cathedral (assistant organist 1990–1991) and Westminster Abbey (sub-organist 1992–98 and acting organist 1998–99.)

Baker won first prize in the Improvisation Competition at the St Albans International Organ Festival in St Albans 1997. While his position at Westminster Cathedral was primarily focused on choral direction, he has an international profile as an organ recitalist, and is particularly known for his skill in organ improvisation. Baker resigned from his position as Master of Music at Westminster Cathedral in 2020 due to a disagreement with the cathedral school over their boarding arrangements.

In 2015 Baker was elected as an Honorary Fellow of Downing College.

Cultural offices
Preceded by Martin Neary	Organist and Master of the Choristers (acting) of Westminster Abbey; 1998–1999	Succeeded by James O'Donnell
