= Harriet (1836 ship) =

History

United Kingdom
- Name: Harriet
- Owner: J.Somes
- Builder: Yarmouth
- Launched: 1836
- Fate: Burnt 19 April 1842

General characteristics
- Tons burthen: 396 (bm)

Harriet was launched at Yarmouth in 1836. Between 1836 and 1840 she may have made one voyage as a whaler in the British southern whale fishery. She burnt in 1842.

== Career ==
Harriet entered Lloyd's Register (LR) in 1836 with J. Somes, owner, and homeport of London. Between 1836 and 1840, LR continued to carry Harriet, but without any name for her master or any reference to her trade.

Harriet, Apsey (or Absey), master, sailed from Great Britain on 16 September 1836, bound for the waters off New Zealand. (Note: Apsey had been master of another Somes' vessel, Thetis, which had returned from a whaling voyage in 1836, when Somes sold her.) She was reported at the Bay of Islands and the Hawaiian islands. She returned to Great Britain on 25 September 1840 with 300 casks (150 tons) of oil. (Note: The British Southern Whale Fishery database attributes this voyage to another Harriet, also of 396 tons burthen. However, that Harriet was under the command of a different master, and was wrecked in 1837.)

Year	Master	Owner	Trade	Source
1840	Beach	J.Somes	London–Africa	LR
1842	Beach	J.Somes	London–Africa	LR

Loss: On 19 April 1842 Harriet, Beach, master, was almost finished loading at Calcutta, India, for her return voyage to Great Britain when at about 1p.m. she caught fire. She was carrying general cargo and saltpeter. The fire spread so rapidly Beach, his officers, and crew, had to jump overboard to save themselves. Her entry in LR for 1842 carries the annotation "burnt".
