= Harriet (1809 ship) =

History

United States
- Name: Harriet
- Launched: 1809, Massachusetts, or 1810, New York (Note: This latter information may represent a temporary conflation of the Harriet of the present article with Harriet (1810 ship).)
- Captured: 1813

United Kingdom
- Name: Harriet
- Acquired: 1813 by purchase of a prize
- Fate: Wrecked 6 or 14 October 1833

General characteristics
- Tons burthen: 410, or 417, or 4174/94, or 427 (bm)
- Length: 111 ft 9 in (34.1 m)
- Beam: 29 ft 2 in (8.9 m)
- Armament: 4 × 9-pounder guns + 8 ×18-pounder carronades

Harriet was launched in Massachusetts in 1809. The British captured her and on 13 January 1813, a prize court condemned her. New owners retained her name. She became a West Indiaman, and made one voyage to New South Wales. Between 1818 and 1832, she made four complete voyages as a whaler in the British southern whale fishery. She was lost in October 1833, in the Seychelles on her fifth whaling voyage.

== Career ==
Harriet first appeared in Lloyd's Register (LR) for 1814.

Year	Master	Owner	Trade	Source
1814	J.Nairne	Seal & Co.	London	LR
1816	Nairn; Jones	Baghouse; Underwood	London–Jamaica; London–New South Wales	Register of Shipping
1816	J.Nairne; J.Jones	Seal & Co. J. Underwood & Co.	London–South Seas	LR

LR shows Harriet, Jones, master, leaving for Bombay on 8 July 1817, sailing under a licence from the British East India Company. However, that report appears to be in error.

Harriet arrived at Hobart Town on 21 March 1817, and at Port Jackson on 11 May 1817, from London, with passengers and merchandise. She left for New Zealand 28 June. She returned to Port Jackson from New Zealand in September, with "spars, etc.", and sailed for London in December. She arrived back at Gravesend on 21 June 1818.

Year	Master	Owner	Trade	Source
1819	J.Jones	Bell & Co	London–South Seas	LR

LR reported that on 9 September 1818, Harriet, J.Jones, master, had again sailed for Bombay. This too appears to be in error.

1st whaling voyage (1818–1822): Lloyd's List reported in September 1818 that Harriet, Jones, master, from London to New South Wales, had on 11 September arrived at the Downs, leaky. She had run onto the Margate Sands and would have to put back into the Thames to repair.

Captain James Jones sailed on 20 September for New Zealand, the Pacific Ocean, and New Zealand. She left on 20 September bound for Australia, New Zealand, the Pacific Ocean, and Chile. On 1 December she was at Bona Vista (Boa Vista, Cape Verde), on her way to "New Holland".

Harriet arrived at Sydney in ballast on 12 February 1819; she sailed for the whale fishery on 6 March. She was reported to have been at Chile and New Zealand in 1821. She arrived back in London on 31 May 1822, with 317 casks of sperm oil and 330 tons of whale oil.

Year	Master	Owner	Trade	Source & notes
1822	J.Jones; Anderson	Bell & Co	London–South Seas	LR; large repair 1822

2nd whaling voyage (1822–1825): Captain William Anderson sailed from London on 4 December 1822, bound for the New south Wales fishery and New Zealand. She arrived at Port Jackson on 8 May 1823. From there she visited Tonga and Bay of Islands. She arrived back in Port Jackson on 29 April 1824, from New Zealand with 125 tons of sperm oil, which she may have transshipped. On 17 May, she sailed again for the whale fishery. On 7 August 1825, she sailed from Port Jackson for England. She arrived in England on 27 December 1825 with 319 casks of whale oil.

3rd whaling voyage (1826–1829): By the time of this voyage ownership had transferred from Bell & Co., to Jones & Co., and lastly to John Lydekker. Captain Edward Reed (or Reid, or Poad) sailed from London on 15 May 1826, bound for the Sandwich Islands. Harriet was reported at Honolulu and Woohoo, at various times. She arrived back in England on 10 January 1829, with more than 2200 barrels of whale oil.

Year	Master	Owner	Trade	Source & notes
1829	Anderson; Reid	Jones & Co	London–South Seas	LR; large repair 1822

4th whaling voyage (1829–1832): Captain Reed sailed from London on 9 June 1829. At various times she was reported at Honolulu, the Japan Grounds, Guam, Honolulu, and Tahiti. Then Harriet, whaler, of 417 tons (bm) and 34 men, was reported to have been at San Francisco in October 1831. She was at Sausalito on 7 October, having come from Japan. She also visited Tahiti on 23 March 1832. She returned to England on 21 August 1832, with 480 casks of whale oil.

Year	Master	Owner	Trade	Source
1833	Read; Maclean	Jones & Co. Templer	London–Southern Fishery	RS; small repairs 1829

== Fate ==
Harriet, McLean, master, sailed from London on 3 November 1832, on a fifth whaling voyage. On 30 August, she was in the Mozambique Channel near Bay of Saint-Augustin where she spoke Reliance. Harriet reported that Captain McLean had died, and that the other officers and crew were refusing to obey Mr. Long as commander.

On 14 October 1833, Harriet, Skey, master, was wrecked on Île Poivre (Pepper Island; 5°46′S 53°19′E), in the Seychelles, while on a whaling voyage. Her crew were rescued. She been sailing from Mauritius to the Seychelles. French sources state that the whaler Harriet, Skey, master, was wrecked on 6 October 1833, on a horseshoe reef near Île Poivre. The crew landed there.
