= Harriet (1798 ship) =

History

Great Britain
- Name: Harriet
- Builder: Captain Lowden, Pictou shipyard, Nova Scotia
- Launched: 25 October 1798
- Fate: Foundered 3 November 1818

General characteristics
- Tons burthen: 600, or 422, or 440, or 452 (bm)
- Complement: 25
- Armament: 1800:14 × 6-pounder guns; 1809:8 × 18-pounder guns + 2 × 6-pounder guns

Harriet was launched at Pictou, Nova Scotia, in 1798. She was the first large ship built in Nova Scotia and was sold in London. She traded widely from London, primarily to North America. She foundered on 3 November 1818.

== Career ==
Harriet first appeared in Lloyd's Register (LR) and as Harriot in the Register of Shipping (RS), both in 1800. The entry in LR gave her origin as New Brunswick (corrected in later volumes to Nova Scotia); RS gave her origin as Nova Scotia. Harriot, Hurry, master, arrived at Liverpool from Pictou in September 1800.

Captain Francis J. Hurry acquired a letter of marque on 10 October 1800.

Year	Master	Owner	Trade	Source
1800	F.Hurry (LR); Hurry (RS)	S.Holland (LR); Humble (RS)	Liverpool–Newfoundland	LR & RS
1802	F.J.Hurry	Hurry & Co.	London–Honduras	LR

When Hurry and Harriott arrived at Torbay Hurry reported that he had seen three vessels in various states of distress as he left Honduras.

Year	Master	Owner	Trade	Source
1805	F.J.Hurry; W.Parr	Hurry & Co.	London–Honduras	LR
1809	W.Parr	Hurry & Co.	Cowes transport	LR; damage repaired 1804

On 8 November 1808 the transport Harriet, Parr, master, sailed from Quebec. However, she had to put back leaky, and had lost her anchor and cables. She was to winter over at Quebec.

Year	Master	Owner	Trade	Source
1810	W.Parr; J.Fox	Hurry; M'Dowall	Cowes transport	LR; damage repaired 1804
1811	J.Fox	M'Dowall	Liverpool–Amelia Island	LR; damage repaired 1804
1812	J.Fox	Haywood	Liverpool–Newfoundland	LR; damage repaired 1804
1814	J.Fox; A.Miller	Haywod; Hurry & Co.	Liverpool–Newfoundland	LR
1815	A.Miller	Hurry & Co.	Liverpool–Riga	LR

On 22 May 1815 Harriet, Miller, master, ran onshore near the Black Rock while sailing from Liverpool to Newfoundland. She was gotten off and brought into dock, having sustained damages.

Year	Master	Owner	Trade	Source
1816	A.Miller	Duncan & Co.	Liverpool–Brunswick	LR; damages repaired 1815
1818	W.Bragg; Graham	Duncan & Co.	Liverpool–Nova Scotia	LR; damages repaired 1815

== Fate ==
Captain Graham and his crew abandoned Harriet on 3 November 1818 at 45°N 47°W as she was sailing from Liverpool to Saint John, New Brunswick. She had lost her masts and had 5 feet of water in her hold. Rebecca, of Salem, rescued Graham and the crew and later put them aboard an English schooner sailing to Halifax, Nova Scotia.
