= Harriet (1795 ship) =

History

Great Britain
- Builder: Mackenzie, Calcutta
- Launched: 12 December 1795 (Note: Lloyd's Register and the Register of Shipping both gave a launch year of 1793, but Hackman gives a more precise date. Unfortunately, Phipps, who gives the fullest listing of vessels built in Calcutta at this time, has no information on Harriet.)
- Fate: Lost c. 1841

General characteristics
- Tons burthen: 363, or 364, or 373, or 400 (bm)
- Complement: 50
- Armament: 1796: 10 × 4-pounder guns; 1799: 20 × 12&18-pounder cannons; 1809: 8 × 18-pounder carronades; 1813: 8 × 18-pounder carronades + 2 × 6-pounder chase guns
- Notes: Teak-built

Harriet (or Harriett; pre-1808 Harriot) was launched at Calcutta, between 1793 and 1795. Between 1795 and 1801 she made three voyages for the British East India Company (EIC), and was chartered for use as a transport for a naval campaign that was cancelled. She became a transport and then in 1817 made another voyage to India, this time under a license from the EIC. She then became a whaler in the British Southern Whale Fishery, making seven complete whaling voyages and being lost c.1841 on her eighth.

== Career ==
1st EIC voyage (1795–1796): Captain Matthew Sparrow sailed from Calcutta on 30 December 1795. She carried rice on behalf of the British government which was importing grain to address high prices for wheat in Britain following a poor harvest.

Harriet reached St Helena on 6 March 1796 and Falmouth on 14 May. She arrived at the Downs on 14 June.

Harriet was admitted to registry in Great Britain on 11 August 1796. She first appeared in Lloyd's Register in 1796.

Year	Master	Owner	Trade	Source
1796	H.Arthur		London–India	LR

Captain Henry Archer sailed from the Downs on 19 September 1796, bound for Madras and Bengal. Harriet reached the Cape on 8 December and Madras on 3 March 1797. From there she reached visited Trincomalee on 12 June before returning to Madras on 12 July. She then arrived at Pondicherry on 15 August and returned to Madras on 17 August. The EIC chartered a number of East Indiamen and country ships to serve as transport for a planned attack on Manila. The vessels assembled in Penang, which Harriet reached on 5 September. However, the Government cancelled the invasion following a peace treaty with Spain and the EIC released the vessels it had engaged. (Later Harriet received £10,438 3s 2d for her services.)

Harriet arrived at Calcutta on 11 December. Homeward bound she was at Kedgeree on 23 February 1798. She reached Colombo on 31 March, the Cape on 27 June, and St Helena on 6 August. She arrived back at the Downs on 18 October.

Captain Henry Archer acquired a letter of marque on 30 January 1799. Harriot sailed from Gravesend on 15 February 1799, bound for India.

Captain Alexander Sinclair sailed from Calcutta on 10 April 1801, bound for Britain. She was at Saugor on 23 April and Acheh on 23 May. She reached St Helena on 15 August and arrived at the Downs on 1 November.

In 1803 Harriot was sold to Boehm & Co.

Year	Master	Owner	Trade	Source & notes
1803	W.King	Boehm&CO.	London–India	LR
1808	W.King	Boehm&CO.	London–India	LR
1809	Black	M'Inly& Co.	London transport	LR
1812	Black; J.Bailey	M'Inly& Co.	London transport	LR
1813	J.Bailey	J.Hubbard	Plymouth–Petersburg	LR
1813	J.Bagley	J.Hubbard	London–Lisbon	Register of Shipping (RS)
1813	J.Bailey	J.Hill	London transport	RS (Supple.); damages & large repair 1813
1814	J.Bailey	J.Hubbard	London	LR; repairs 1813

A House of Commons report stated that Harriet had been sold to the government before 1814 for use as a transport. If so, this is not obvious from her listings in either LR or the RS.

In 1813 the EIC had lost its monopoly on the trade between India and Britain. British ships were then free to sail to India or the Indian Ocean under a license from the EIC.

Year	Master	Owner	Trade	Source & notes
1816	J.Bailey	J.Hubbard	London–India	LR; repairs 1813
1818	AdePyster; J.Gradon	A.Hill	London–India	LR; large repair 1813

On 8 July 1816, Harriet, de Peyster, master, sailed for Madras and Bengal under a license from the EIC. On 29 July Harriet was at Madeira, having come from London on her way to India. She returned to Liverpool from Bengal on 27 October 1817.

Year	Master	Owner	Trade	Source & notes
1819	J.Gradon	A.Hill (Note: Her owners were Almon Hill, Limehouse, ship builder; John Boulcott Junior, ship broker; and James Hill, Limehouse, ship builder.)	London–South Seas	LR; large repair 1813

Harriet's owners next employed her as a whaler in the British Southern Whale Fishery. She made eight whale fishing voyages and was lost on the last of these. (Note: The British Southern Whale Fishery database currently describes Harriet as an American prize of 363 tons (bm). This is incorrect.)

1st whaling voyage (1818–1820): Captain John Gradon sailed for the Pacific on 28 July 1818. Harriet was reported in the Juan Fernández Islands and at California. She returned to Britain on 5 August 1820.

2nd whaling voyage (1821–1823): Captain Dixon sailed from England on 4 February 1821. Harriet returned to Britain on 27 June 1823.

3rd whaling voyage (1823–1824): Captain Dixon sailed from Britain on 25 August 1823. Harriet returned on 4 November 1824 from the Cape of good Hope with 500 casks of whale oil, plus whale fins and 20 seal skins.

4th whaling voyage (1825–1827): Captain John Clark sailed from Britain on 19 January 1825, bound for New Zealand. She returned on 25 May 1827 with 500 casks.

5th whaling voyage (1827–1830): Captain Clark sailed from Britain on 3 September 1827, bound for the Pacific. In May 1829 Harriet was at Sydney, New South Wales. she returned to Britain on 29 June 1834 with 700 casks of whale oil.

Year	Master	Owner	Trade	Source & notes
1830	Clarke; Raine	Hill&Co.	London–South Seas	Register of Shipping; small repairs 1825, 1827, and 1830

6th whaling voyage (1830–1834): Captain J. Rains sailed from Britain on 26 August 1830, bound for the whaling grounds off Japan. Harriet returned on 27 June 1830 with 780 casks of whale oil.

7th whaling voyage (1834–1838): Captain Richard Cuthbert sailed from Britain on 14 December 1834, bound for the Pacific Ocean. She was variously reported at Oahu, the Bay of Islands, and Honolulu. Harriet put into Honolulu on 30 November 1837 with all but four members of her crew helpless with scurvy. She may also have visited Pago Pago; a missionary reported that the harbour there was also known as Cuthbert's harbour after the master of the first British vessel to have visited. Harriet returned full to Britain on 24 July 1838 with 1800 barrels of whale oil.

== Loss ==
Captain Charles Bunker sailed Harriet from Britain on 8 June 1839, bound for the Pacific for her eighth whaling voyage. In 1840 she was at Sydney. In 1844 it was reported that while she was at Strong's Island (Kosrae in 1841, the locals seized Harriet, murdered Bunker and his crew, and burnt Harriet to the water line.
