= Harriet (1829 ship) =

Sailing ship in the Royal Navy and later a commercial whaler

History

United Kingdom
- Name: Harriet
- Builder: Ipswich
- Launched: 1813
- Acquired: 1829 by purchase
- Fate: Wrecked 16 July 1837

General characteristics
- Tons burthen: 396, or 405, or 410 (bm)
- Sail plan: Brig

Harriet was a former vessel of the British Royal Navy, probably the Cruizer-class brig-sloop HMS Harrier. The Navy sold her in 1829 and her new owners deployed her as a whaler in the British Southern Whale Fishery. She made three complete whaling voyages and was wrecked in July 1837 during her fourth.

== Origins ==
LR gave Harriet's origin as "Kgs Yd", signalling that she had been built for the Navy. The Register of Shipping (RS) identified where she was built as Ipswich. Both registers gave her launch year as 1813. There were three vessels built for the Navy in Ipswich in 1813 that were sold in 1828 or 1829 and of a burthen similar to Harriet's. All three were Cruizer-class brig sloops of about 386 tons (bm): Fly, Harlequin, and Harrier. Fly was sold in Bombay in 1828, and Harlequin was sold in Jamaica in September 1829. Fly's purchaser could have sailed her to Britain for resale, with the result that although Harriet is most probably the former Harrier, the link cannot be verified definitively absent original research.

== Whaler ==
Harriet underwent a large repair in 1829.

| Year | Master | Owner | Trade | Source |
|---|---|---|---|---|
| 1929 | W.Young | Clay & Co. | London–South Seas | LR |

1st whaling voyage (1829–1831): Captain W. Young sailed from London on 19 September 1829, bound for the seas off Japan. Harriet was reported to have visited Guam and to have fished off Guam. She returned to England on 10 August 1831 with some 2200 barrels of whale oil.

2nd whaling voyage (1831–183_): Captain Thomas Tapsell sailed Harriet from Great Britain on 15 November 1831. It is not clear when she returned.

| Year | Master | Owner | Trade | Source & notes |
|---|---|---|---|---|
| 1833 | Young; Bunker | G.Clay & Co. | London–South Seas | Register of Shipping; large repair 1829 |

3rd whaling voyage (1833–1836): Harriet was reported at Nukahiva in the Marquesas Islands by 17 April 1833. From 11 to 30 May she was at Honolulu. In June she was on the Japan Grounds. In mid-1834 she was in the Santa Cruz Islands. From 26 October to 2 November she was at Wahoo (Oahu). She returned to London on 8 December 1835 with 500 casks of whale oil.

| Year | Master | Owner | Trade | Source & notes |
|---|---|---|---|---|
| 1837 | Christie | G.H.Paice | London–South Seas | LR; small repairs 1836 |

4th whaling voyage (1836–Loss): Harriet, William Christie, master, sailed from London on 7 June 1836, bound for New Zealand. On 3 November she was at Bay of Islands, where Captain Christie died. She had not yet taken any whales. Captain Thomas Ridout replaced Christie. She was at Bay of Islands again on 11 May 1837, this time with 1800 barrels of whale oil. She was next reported at Rotumah on 6 June. On 16 July she struck on Providence Reef, in the Fiji Islands. The crew, with the exception of the carpenter, was saved. Reportedly, she had 300 barrels of oil aboard, suggesting that she had already transshipped much, if not all, of her catch.

Harriet was last listed in 1838 with Christie, master, G.H.Pace, owner, and trade London–South Seas.
