= List of shipwrecks in April 1832 =

The list of shipwrecks in April 1832 includes ships sunk, foundered, grounded, or otherwise lost during April 1832.

== 1 April ==
List of shipwrecks: 1 April 1832
Ship	State	Description
War Hawk	United States	The ship was abandoned in the Atlantic Ocean. She was on a voyage from Havana, Cuba to Jersey, Channel Islands.

== 3 April ==
List of shipwrecks: 3 April 1832
Ship	State	Description
Bellona	United Kingdom	The ship was wrecked at "Cartena" on the coast of the Adriatic Sea. Her crew were rescued. She was on a voyage from Trieste to Odesa.

== 4 April ==
List of shipwrecks: 4 April 1832
Ship	State	Description
Louisa	United Kingdom	The ship was driven ashore and wrecked at Barrington, Nova Scotia, British North America. She was on a voyage from Greenock, Renfrewshire to Saint John, New Brunswick, British North America.

== 5 April ==
List of shipwrecks: 5 April 1832
Ship	State	Description
Pallas	United Kingdom	The ship was driven ashore and wrecked at Höganäs, Sweden. Her crew were rescued. She was on a voyage from Newcastle upon Tyne, Northumberland to Stettin. Prussia.

== 8 April ==
List of shipwrecks: 8 April 1832
Ship	State	Description
Zyllah	United Kingdom	The ship struck a sunken rock off the Formigas, Western Islands, and was consequently abandoned the next day. Morley (United Kingdom) rescued Zyllah's crew; she was on a voyage from Dundee, Forfarshire to Saint Domingue.

== 10 April ==
List of shipwrecks: 10 April 1832
Ship	State	Description
Champion	United Kingdom	The ship was driven ashore in the Pentland Firth. She was later refloated.
Huna	United Kingdom	The ship was driven ashore in the Pentland Firth. She was later refloated.
Lord Suffield	United Kingdom	The ship was driven ashore and wrecked in the Pentland Firth. She was on a voyage from Hull to Quebec City, Lower Canada, British North America.
Sarah	United Kingdom	The ship was driven ashore in the Pentland Firth. She was later refloated.

== 11 April ==
List of shipwrecks: 11 April 1832
Ship	State	Description
Star	United Kingdom	The ship was driven ashore in the Pentland Firth. She was on a voyage from London to Sligo.

== 12 April ==
List of shipwrecks: 12 April 1832
Ship	State	Description
Experiment	United Kingdom	The ship was driven ashore three leagues (9 nautical miles (17 km) east of Calais, France. She was on a voyage from Hull Yorkshire to Quebec City, Lower Canada, British North America. Forty-five passengers survived.

== 14 April ==
List of shipwrecks: 14 April 1832
Ship	State	Description
Wanderer	United States	The ship capsized at Galway, United Kingdom. She was declared a total loss.

== 16 April ==
List of shipwrecks: 16 April 1832
Ship	State	Description
Bellick Castle	United Kingdom	The ship was driven ashore at Ballina, County Mayo. She was on a voyage from Liverpool, Lancashire to Ballina.
Ida	France	The ship was wrecked near Dénia, Spain. She was on a voyage from Marseille, Bouches-du-Rhône to Pori, Grand Duchy of Finland.

== 18 April ==
List of shipwrecks: 18 April 1832
Ship	State	Description
Brisk	United Kingdom	The brig was wrecked on Wallis Island.

== 20 April ==
List of shipwrecks: 20 April 1832
Ship	State	Description
Fowey	United Kingdom	The ship was in collision with Economy (United Kingdom and sank in the North Sea off Filey, Yorkshire. Her crew were rescued.
Jane	United Kingdom	The sloop capsized off the Calf of Man, Isle of Man with the loss of one of her two crew. The survivor was rescued by Fame (United Kingdom).

== 21 April ==
List of shipwrecks: 21 April 1832
Ship	State	Description
Peggy	United Kingdom	The sloop was driven ashore and damaged at Arbroath, Forfarshire. Her crew survived. She was on a voyage from Leith, Lothian to Arbroath. Peggy was refloated the next day and taken in to Arbroathn where she was subsequently wrecked on 17 November.

== 22 April ==
List of shipwrecks: 22 April 1832
Ship	State	Description
Constitution	United Kingdom	The ship was driven ashore on the coast of Ireland. All on board, over 200 people, were rescued. She was on a voyage from Belfast, County Antrim to a North American port.
Foundling	United Kingdom	The brig was driven ashore and wrecked at Mizen Head, County Cork. She was on a voyage from Demerara to Greenock, Renfrewshire.
Hannah	United Kingdom	The ship was wrecked in Killala Bay. Her crew were rescued. She was on a voyage from Killala, County Mayo to Liverpool, Lancashire.
Royal Recovery	United Kingdom	The ship sprang a leak and foundered off the Smalls Lighthouse. All on board were rescued by London (United Kingdom). She was on a voyage from Youghal, County Cork to Cardiff, Glamorgan.

== 23 April ==
List of shipwrecks: 23 April 1832
Ship	State	Description
Romford	United States	The barque wran aground on the Burrow of Ballyteague, off the coast of County Galway, United Kingdom. All on board were rescued. She was on a voyage from New Orleans, Louisiana to Liverpool, Lancashire, United Kingdom.

== 24 April ==
List of shipwrecks: 24 April 1832
Ship	State	Description
Fanny	Kingdom of Hanover	The ship was wrecked on Borkum with the loss of her captain. She was on a voyage from St. Ubes, Portugal to Emden.
Mary Eliza	United Kingdom	The ship was lost on the Haaks Bank, in the North Sea off the coast of the Netherlands. Her crew were rescued. She was on a voyage from Liverpool, Lancashire to Bremen.
Nereid	United Kingdom	The brig was driven ashore and wrecked at Egerness Point, Wigtownshire. All on board were rescued.

== 25 April ==
List of shipwrecks: 25 April 1832
Ship	State	Description
Mary Ann	United Kingdom	The ship was driven ashore and wrecked at Whitby, Yorkshire. Her crew were rescued. She was on a voyage from Rostock to London.

== 26 April ==
List of shipwrecks: 26 April 1832
Ship	State	Description
Augusta	United Kingdom	The ship was lost on the Whiting Sand, in the North Sea off the coast of Suffolk. Her crew were rescued. She was on a voyage from Stettin, Prussia to King's Lynn, Norfolk.
Queen Charlotte	United Kingdom	Six weeks into a whaling voyage from Sydney, New South Wales, the brig was sighted for the last time. She subsequently disappeared without trace.
Resolution	United Kingdom	The ship was driven ashore and wrecked at Scarborough, Yorkshire.
Shannon	United Kingdom	The whaler struck an iceberg and foundered in the Atlantic Ocean with the loss of nineteen of her 45 crew. The survivors were rescued by Hoalfesken and Navigation (both Denmark), but seven of them subsequently died.

== 27 April ==
List of shipwrecks: 27 April 1832
Ship	State	Description
Augusta	United Kingdom	The ship struck the Whilme Sand, in The Wash and foundered. Her crew were rescued. She was on a voyage from Bremen to King's Lynn, Norfolk.

== 28 April ==
List of shipwrecks: 28 April 1832
Ship	State	Description
Lively	United Kingdom	The ship was destroyed by fire at North Meols, Lancashire with the loss of one of her crew.

== 29 April ==
List of shipwrecks: 29 April 1832
Ship	State	Description
Mary Eliza	United Kingdom	The ship was lost on the Haaks Bank, in the North Sea off the coast of the Netherlands.

== 30 April ==
List of shipwrecks: 30 April 1832
Ship	State	Description
Fancy	United Kingdom	The ship foundered off the Dutchman's Bank, in the Irish Sea. She was on a voyage from Beaumaris, Anglesey to Chester, Cheshire.
Friend's Adventure	United Kingdom	The ship struck a rock at South Shields, County Durham and was wrecked. She was on a voyage from Hull, Yorkshire to South Shields.
Mars	United Kingdom	The ship was wrecked on the Haisborough Sands, in the North Sea off the coast of Norfolk. Her crew Survived. She was on a voyage from South Shields to Brixham, Devon.

== Unknown date ==
List of shipwrecks: Unknown date 1832
Ship	State	Description
Briton	United Kingdom	The ship was wrecked off Islay, Inner Hebrides.
Harriet	United Kingdom	The ship was wrecked on Fanning Island before 28 April.
Jean François	France	The ship was abandoned before 10 April. She was on a voyage from Wilmington, Delaware, United States to Guadeloupe.
Mobile	United States	The ship was wrecked on the south coast of Cuba. She was on a voyage from Cádiz, Spain to Havana, Cuba.
