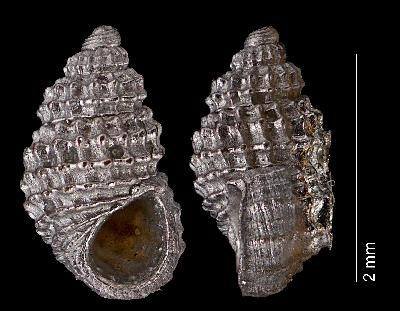
- Shell of Alvania formicarum (paratype at MNHN, Paris)

Scientific classification
- Kingdom: Animalia
- Phylum: Mollusca
- Class: Gastropoda
- Subclass: Caenogastropoda
- Order: Littorinimorpha
- Family: Rissoidae
- Genus: Alvania
- Species: A. formicarum

Binomial name
- Alvania formicarum Gofas, 1989

= Alvania formicarum =

Species of gastropod

Alvania formicarum is a species of minute sea snail, a marine gastropod mollusk or micromollusk in the family Rissoidae. It is a small species of sea snail, typically found in the Mediterranean Sea. According to the World Register of Marine Species (WoRMS), Alvania formicarum was first described by Montagu in 1803.

== Description ==
The length of the shell attains 2.5 mm.

== Distribution ==
They are typically found on the east coast of the Formigas Islets in the Azores.
