= Dorothy (1815 ship) =

History

United Kingdom
- Name: Dorothy
- Owner: 1815:C. Horsfall
- Builder: Liverpool
- Launched: 1815
- Fate: Wrecked in 1833

General characteristics
- Tons burthen: 416, (bm)
- Propulsion: Sail

Dorothy was a merchant ship built at Liverpool, England, in 1815. She made a number of voyages between England and India with cargo and undertook one voyage transporting convicts to New South Wales.

== Career ==
Under the command of John Hargreaves and surgeon Robert Espie, she sailed from Cork, Ireland on 5 May 1820, stopped at Rio, leaving on 7 July and arrived at Sydney on 25 August. She embarked 190 male convicts and had no deaths en route. The guard consisted of detachments of the 48th Regiment of Foot, under the command of Lieutenant Holdsworth of 82nd Regiment of Foot. Passengers were Mrs Espie, with three children and Mrs Holdsworth.

Dorothy departed Port Jackson on 8 November 1820, bound for Batavia and Calcutta.

== Fate ==
While on a voyage from Liverpool to Bombay, India, under Captain James Garnock (1786 – 1849) of Liverpool she sprang a leak in late June 1833. She was abandoned by her 25 crew on 5 July and she foundered in the South Atlantic (28°24′S 21°00′W). The crew in two boats made for Trinidade and Martim Vaz (Brazil), which they reached on 20 July, but were unable to land. They then made for Bahia, and were rescued on 24 July by Charles Adams (United States, Capt. Alex. S. Palmer) and most of them set ashore at Pernambuco, Brazil. They had sailed 1311 nautical miles in open boats with few provisions.
