= Formigas =

Archipelago of islets in the Azores, Portugal

Native name: Ilhéus das Formigas Nickname: Formigas Bank
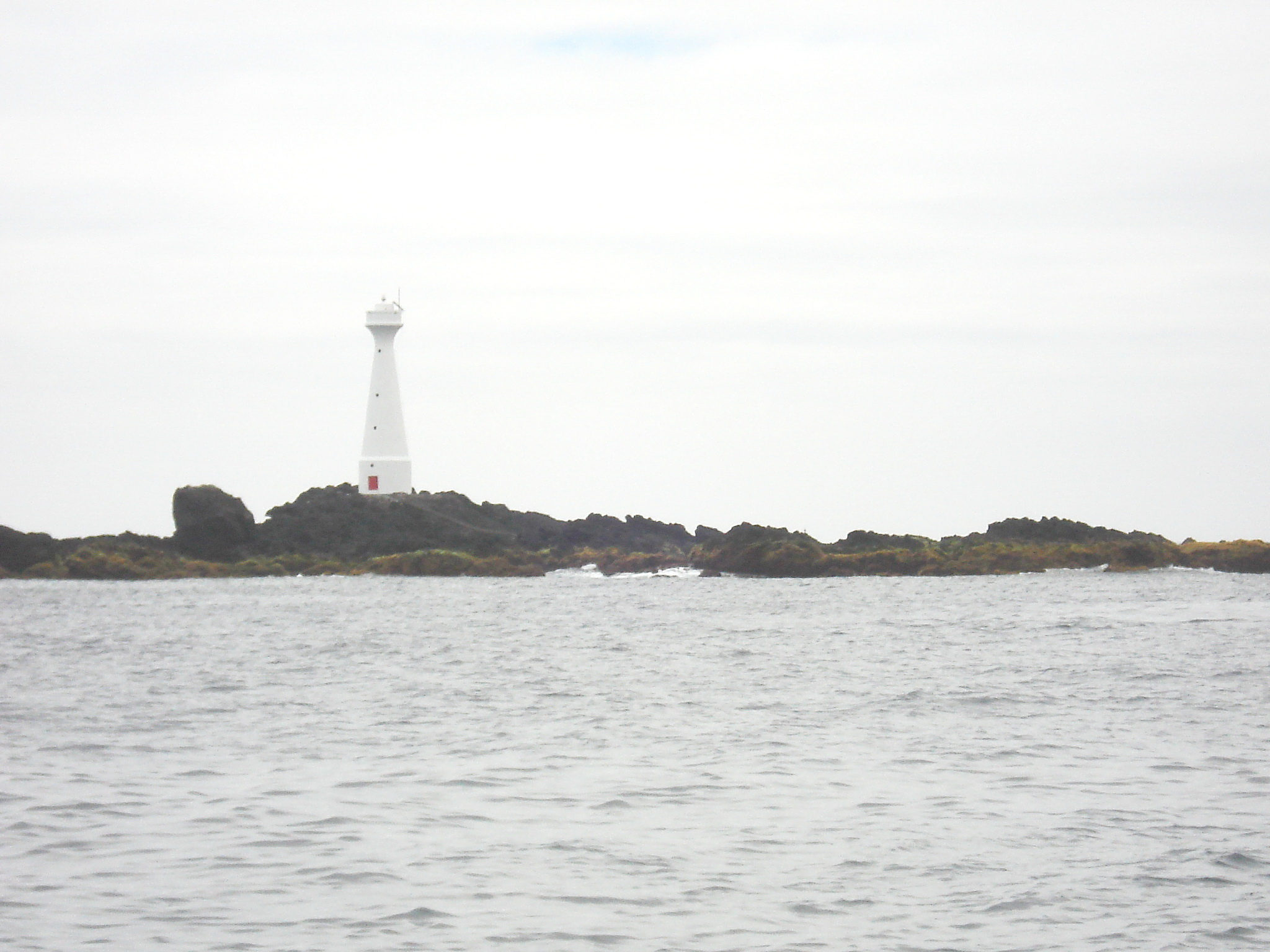
- The lighthouse on Formigão, the largest islet of the Formigas

- Location of the islets in the Azores
- Etymology: Formigas, Portuguese plural for ants

Geography
- Location: Atlantic Ocean
- Coordinates: 37°16′00″N 24°46′00″W
- Area: 0.009 km^{2} (0.0035 sq mi)

Administration
- Portugal
- Autonomous region: Azores

Demographics
- Population: Uninhabited

Additional information
- Official website: https://siaram.azores.gov.pt/vulcanismo/banco-formigas/_intro.html

Formigas Islets (Portuguese: Ilhéus das Formigas [fuɾˈmiɣɐʃ]; lit. 'Islets of the Ants'), sometimes referred to as the Formigas Bank, are a group of uninhabited rocky outcroppings in the eastern group of the Azores archipelago, an autonomous region of Portugal. The bank is located 43 kilometres (27 mi) northeast of Santa Maria and southeast of São Miguel, covering a surface area of approximately 9,000 square metres (97,000 ft^{2}). The submerged Dollabarat Reef is in the same area. The only structure on the islets is a lighthouse located on Formigão (Big Ant), the largest islet.

== History ==
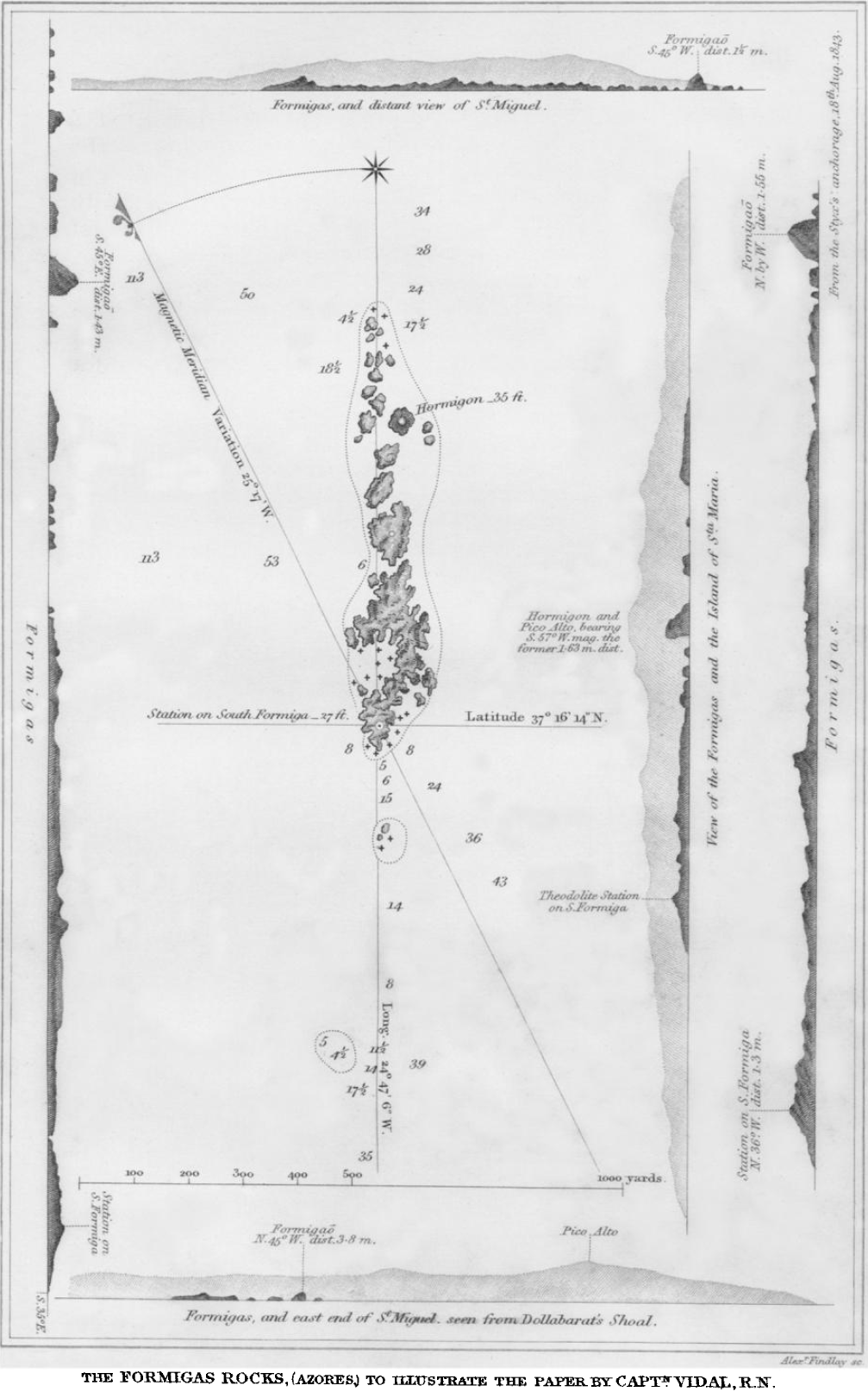
Map of 1849

The Formigas were discovered by Portuguese explorers Diogo de Silves and Gonçalo Velho Cabral in 1431 during their journey to Madeira. The islets were neglected due to the contemporaneous discovery of the neighboring inhabitable islands of Santa Maria and São Miguel. In the 16th century, Portuguese chronicler Gaspar Frutuoso reported on the Formigas' rich marine life.

The Formigas served as both an aid and hindrance to navigation from their discovery well into the 20th century. On 8 April 1832, the British ship Zyllah wrecked on a subsurface rock at the Formigas and its crew had to be rescued the next day by the British merchantman Morley. Nearly ninety years later on 16 June 1921, the Greek cargo ship Olympia ran aground and wrecked at Formigas; the crew survived.

The islets have long garnered scientific and commercial interest. In 1886, the Italian ship Corsaro visited the Formigas Islets, dredging the area for the first time for scientific research purposes. Prince Albert I of Monaco's Princess Alice expedition also visited the islets in 1895 to investigate the marine life, for both scientific and commercial fishery purposes.

Since 4 April 1988, the Formigas Bank has the status of Nature Reserve and is protected by a decree of the Legislative Assembly of the Azores (Regional Legislative Decree Nº11/88/A). It is also considered a European Site of Community Importance (Rede Natura 2000). The habitats protected by the Azorean decree include the area from the emerged islets to depths of more than 1,700 metres (5,600 ft), yet this has not stopped incidents of commercial fishing. Consequently, the area is regularly patrolled by a Portuguese naval vessel based in Ponta Delgada.

Since 16 June 2008, the Formigas Islets and neighboring Dollabarat Reef have been recognized as a Ramsar Convention wetland under the name Ilhéus das Formigas e Recife Dollabarat.

=== Formigas Lighthouse ===
The Formigas Lighthouse (Portuguese: Farol das Formigas) is located on Formigão, the largest islet of the Formigas. The current beacon is a 19-metre (62 ft) stone tower painted white. As the base of the tower is at an elevation of about 3 metres (9.8 ft) above sea level, the beacon is at 22 metres (72 ft) above sea level. The lighthouse's signal is visible from 12 nautical miles (22 km) away on clear days, although there have been reports of seeing it from the southeastern part of São Miguel and the northeastern part of Santa Maria. In rough seas, waves completely immerse the tower.

As early as 1883 the Portuguese government formally recognized the dangers posed by the Formigas to navigation and proposed building a lighthouse on the islets, but nothing was constructed at the time. On 2 March 1895, at the General Meeting of the Autonomous District of Ponta Delgada, the District initiated construction of lighthouses on São Miguel and Santa Maria. Because of this, and also due to the technical difficulties of building a lighthouse in that era in a place so inhospitable as the Formigas, construction of a lighthouse on the islets themselves was further delayed.

Finally, in the summer of 1948 the Portuguese government began a complex operation to build a lighthouse on Formigão. In order to land personnel and equipment on the islet, the workers first had to break away subsurface rocks and build a wharf. Despite various interruptions to the work due to rough seas and inclement weather, in 36 days the workers managed to build a small beacon. In 1962, the Portuguese Navy's lightship NRP Almirante Schultz anchored at the Formigas and was used as a work base for renovating and modernizing the lighthouse. In the succeeding years the lighthouse was further modernized; the beacon now runs on solar power and its old acetylene lamp has been replaced with a newer model.

== Geography ==
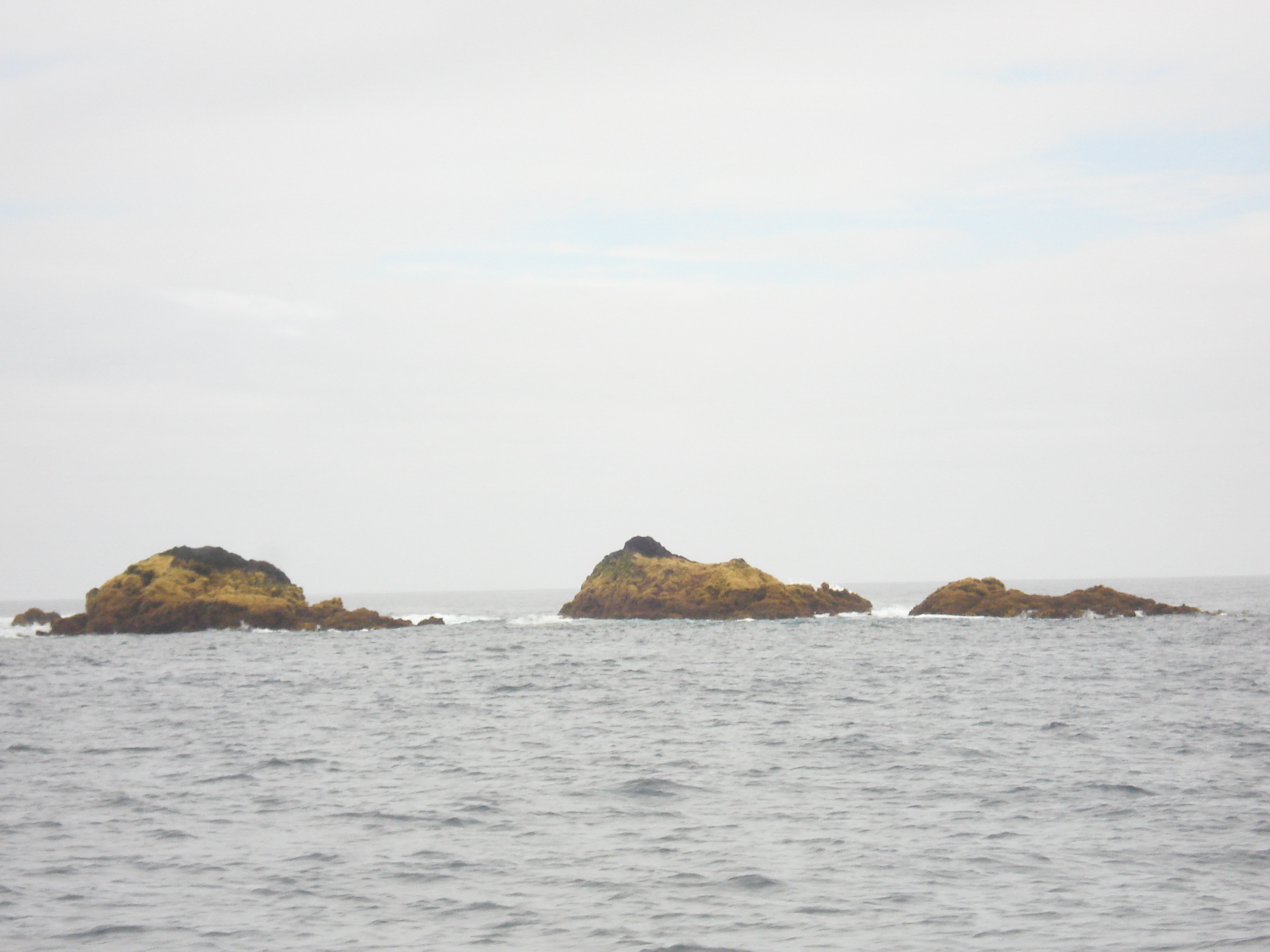
Dispersed rocks in the northern part of the Formigas.

The islets are composed of basalt flows that occurred approximately 4 million years ago, although calcareous fossiliferous sediments dating to 4-6 million years ago have been discovered. The bank extends for 13 kilometres (8.1 mi) from northwest to southeast and is 5.5 kilometres (3.4 mi) wide. Due to strong currents and frequent large swells, the linear rock outcroppings lack any terrestrial flora or fauna. Along the archipelago's perimeter, the seabed drops steeply to a depth of 50–70 metres (160–230 ft) on either side, and gently at the northern and southern tips. The area of the bank referred to as the Dollabarat Reef is an area of shallower gradient, situated 5 kilometres (3.1 mi) along the southwest of the Formigas Islets.

Formigas is Portuguese for ants, as the small and dispersed rocks resemble scattered ants. The largest islet Formigão has a maximum altitude of 11 metres (36 ft) above sea level. Generally the islets are useful for navigation and visible up to 19 kilometres (12 mi) away on clear days, but during inclement weather a ship can run aground on the rocks without even seeing the lighthouse.

=== Biome ===
The Formigas Bank is essentially a submarine volcano inhabited by deep-dwelling marine species such as coral and sponges. The volcanic cone is delimited approximately by the Formigas islets of the northwest and Dollabarat Reef to the southeast. In the ancient crater there is a rich community of species common to the Azores. Among the species typical of the area are wrasse (Mediterranean rainbow wrasse and ornate wrasse), damselfish, sergeant fish (yellow and black), grouper, Mediterranean parrotfish, and the emblematic Atlantic goliath grouper, serranidae and barred hogfish. Alongside these are African threadfish and longbill spearfish, pelagic predators that also reside in the bank, and migratory species like manta ray and whale shark.

The base and surface of the volcano is covered in various types of black coral, soft corals, sponges, and other invertebrates, as well as various algae, forming a mosaic of micro-habitats. The geological differences of the Formigas Islets and Dollabarat Reef relative to the rest of the Azores are accentuated by the types of flora present there. The Formigas and Dollabarat both have an elevated biomass of brown algae considered unique to the Azores; the fields of kelp are situated between 45 metres (148 ft) and 60 metres (200 ft) below the crater at the Formigas, while at Dollabarat the brown algae is located along the reef's flanks.

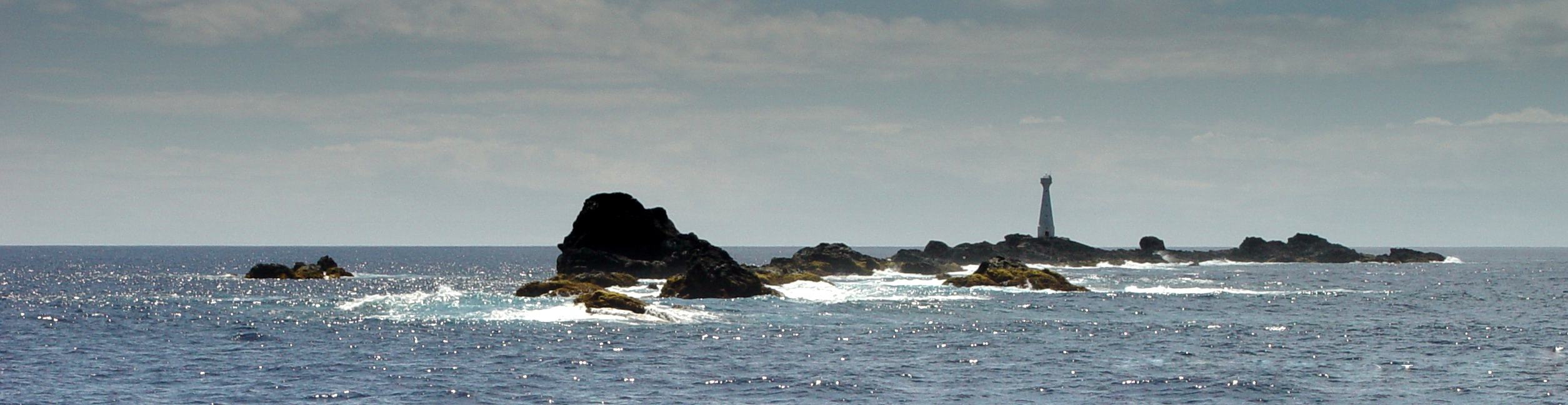
Photograph of the Formigas Islets (2010).
