= Terine =

Coordinates: 3°51′36″N 159°21′53″W

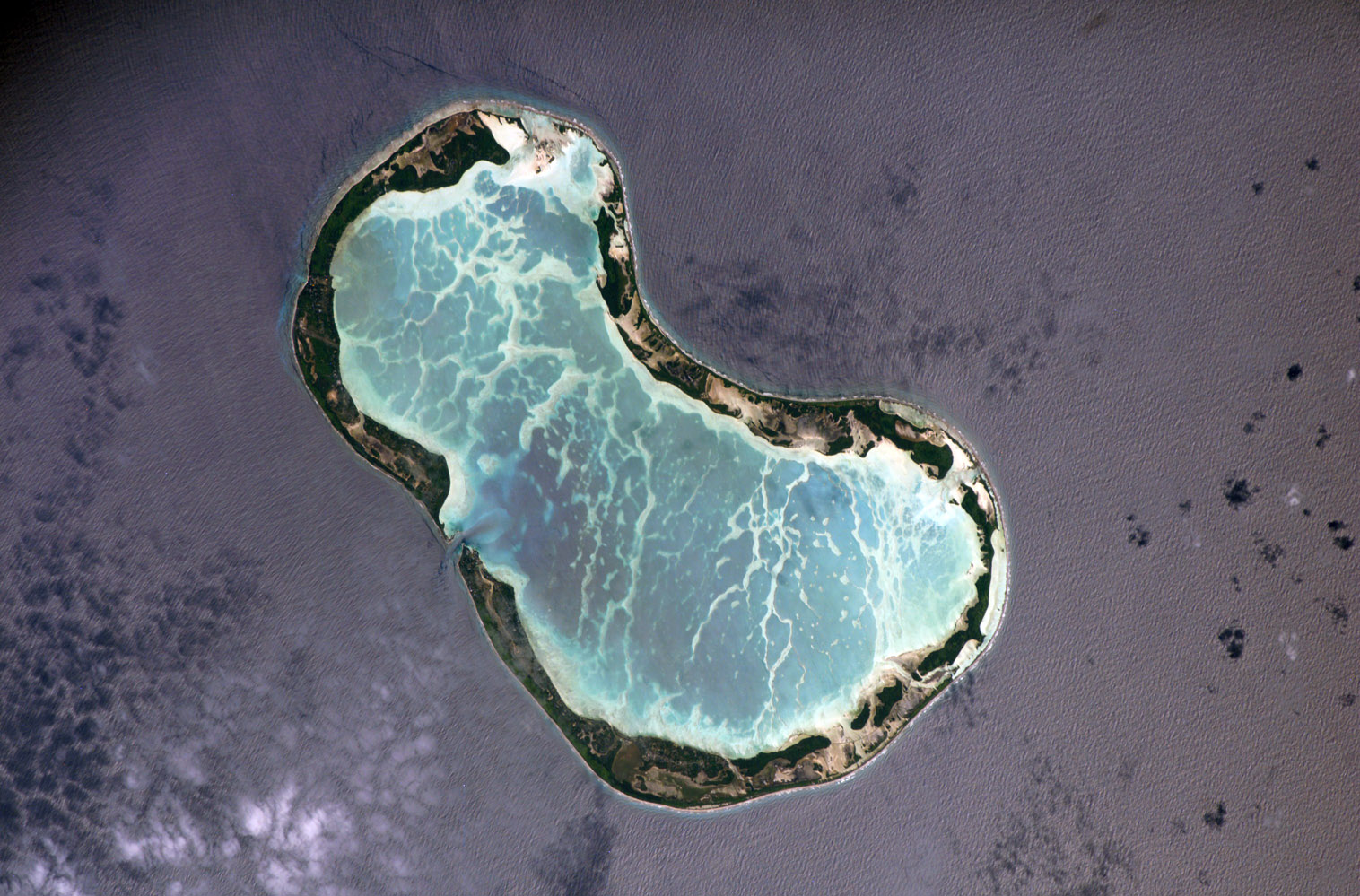

Tenenebo is a settlement located on Tabuaeran atoll, Kiribati. Aontenaa is to the north; with Tereitannano to the south.

In the 2010 census 453 people were recorded as living in Tenenebo.
