= Aramari =

Human settlement in Kiribati

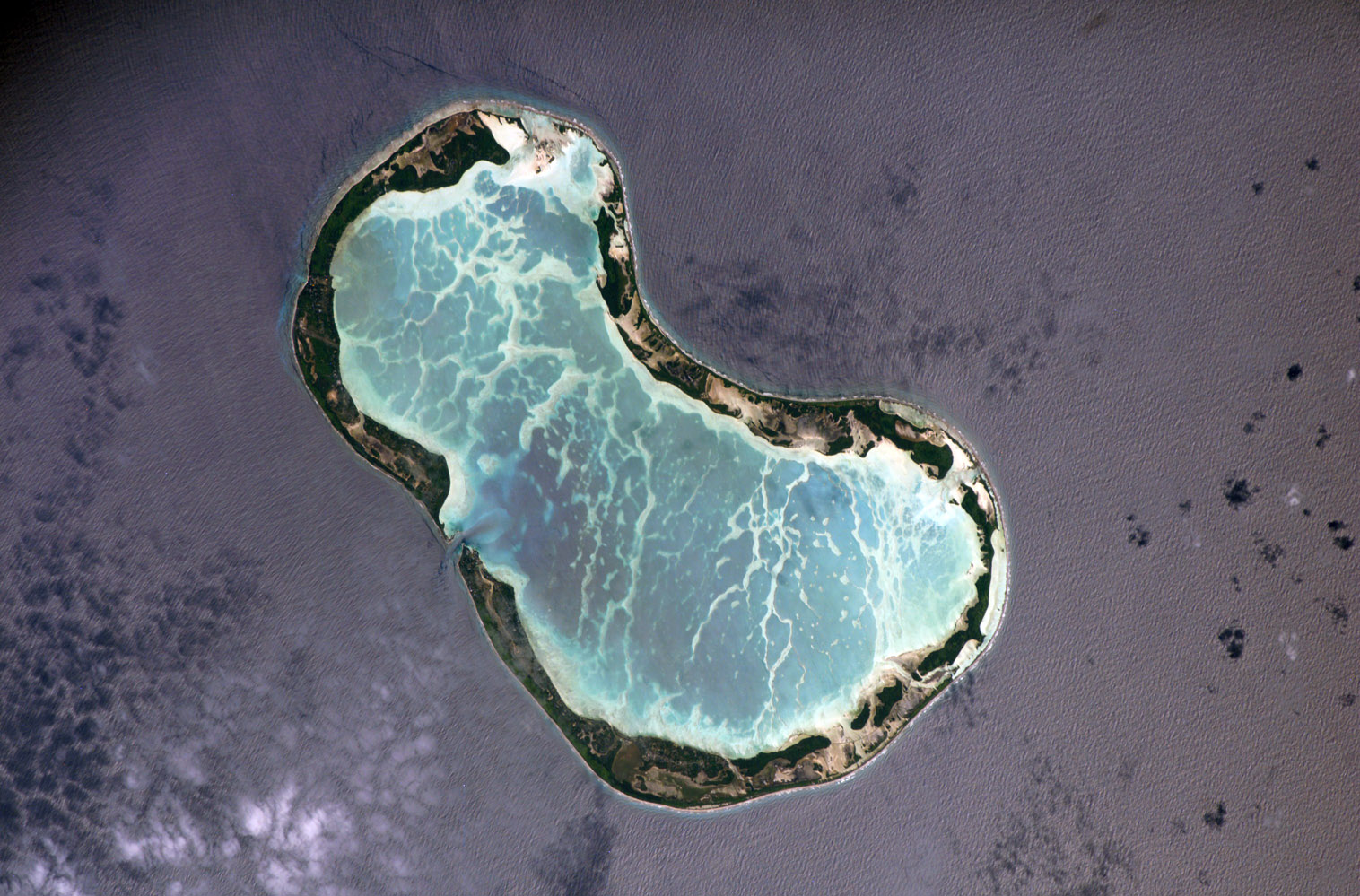

Aramari is a settlement located on Tabuaeran atoll, Kiribati. Tereitannano is to the north; with Mwanuku or Eten to the south.

In the 2010 census 244 people were recorded as living in Aramari.
