= Robert Espie =

Irish surgeon in the Royal Navy (1791–1870)

- Born: 1791; Derry, Ireland
- Died: 2 October 1870 (aged 78–79)
- Occupation: Surgeon
- Employer: The Royal Navy
- Known for: Medical missionary work on convict ships to Australia.
- Spouse: Janet Jerman Simmons
- Children: 3

Robert Espie (1791 – October 1870) was an Irish convict ship surgeon-superintendent born in 1791. He served for the Royal Navy and was appointed surgeon on 21 May 1811. He was a surgeon on eight convict ships throughout the early 1800s. Out of all of the voyages, only eight patients died under his care. Many of his medical journals did not survive but the ones that did provide insight to his life and experiences as a surgeon on the ships. He died on 2 October 1870.

== Personal life ==
Robert Espie was born in Derry, Ireland in 1791.

He grew up with five siblings, George Espie, John Espie, and three other siblings. His brother, George Espie, accompanied him on the convict ships to Australia. He acquired land in Van Diemen's land and entered a partnership with his brother.

He married Janet Jerman Simons, the youngest daughter of William Simons of Sydenham in England on January 17, 1828, at St. Martin's in the Fields Church, Middlesex. They had three kids. In 1851, Robert and Janet Espie were living at Hanstead House in Lewisham, U.K., with three servants. His wife died in 1854 when she was 60 years old and in 1861, Espie was living in Bushey Hertfordshire with three servants and their children.

According to The Navy List, Espie is listed as a medical officer with his Date of Seniority being 4 February 1815. He was appointed acting-surgeon at Port Dalrymple in October 1820. However, he resigned a year later in February 1821 because of ill-health.

He died on 2 October 1870. He was 79 years old.

== Missionary Work ==
Throughout his career, he was employed as a Surgeon-Superintendent on eight different convict ships to Australia: Morley in 1817, Shipley in 1818, Dorothy in 1820, Lord Sidmouth in 1822, Lady Rowena in 1825, Mary in 1830, Roslin Castle in 1834 and the Elizabeth in 1836.

=== Morley (1817) ===
His first appointment was on the Morley in 1817. It was the first of four voyages bringing convicts to New South Wales. It departed England on the 18 December in 1817 and arrived in Port Jackson on 10 April in 1817. None of Espie's medical journals from this voyage survived. However, it is noted that there were no deaths. After this journey, he returned to England via Batavia on the Morley in May 1817.

=== Shipley (1818–1819) ===
Espie's second appointment was a year later on the Shipley in 1818. It was the second of the four voyages bringing convicts to New South Wales. Espie kept a medical journal from the 23rd of June, 1818 to the 21st of December, 1818. There were one hundred and fifty male convicts from England under his care. Three convicts died during this voyage. In his journal, Espie notes that their death was not because the ship was “sickly” or related to cleanliness; their deaths were “purely the effect of incidental disease attacking men already much advanced in years and greatly emaciated by mental anxiety and confinement…”. He returned to England in 1819.

=== Dorothy (1820) ===
His next voyage was on the Dorothy in 1820. His brother, George Espie, joined him on this voyage. He kept a journal that dated from 1 March 1820 to 29 September 1820. He starts by noting that he received thirty male convicts who were orderly and well-behaved. None got sick in the first few days. He then received 102 more male convicts who were generally healthy but about six had bad legs. He received 59 more, totaling to 191 convicts.

He notes that the prisoners were in good health as they were mostly young men under the age of thirty-five. After inspection, he also found the ship was clean and comfortable. After a few days on the voyage, Espie started taking off the leg irons of the well-behaved prisoners. On this voyage, his brother George, wife Janet, and their three children came along.

=== Lord Sidmouth (1822–1823) ===
His fourth voyage was on Lord Sidmouth 97 English female convicts. He kept a medical journal through this journey from 22 August 1822 to 1 March 1823. According to his journals, it can be noted that he was less tolerant of females than of male prisoners.

=== Lady Rowena (1825) ===
His fifth voyage was on the Lady Rowena with 100 female convicts. None of the women died during this passage but there are no medical journals available.

=== Mary (1830) ===
In 1830, he was appointed to the convict ship Mary by the Royal Navy. She arrived in Van Diemen's Land on 10 April 1830 with 167 male prisoners. Out of these, one prisoner died.

=== Roslin Castle ===
During his journey on the Roslin Castle, he kept a medical journal. There were seven cases that he considered to be serious, three of whom died. The first one was named James Bond, a 19-year-old who concealed his illness and died on the ship. The second was Edward Gale, age 29, who was already sick before the journey and later died of a ruptured blood vessel. The third patient was George Turner, a sixty-nine-year-old man who caught a chill and despite Espie's treatment and nourishment, failed to recover. Espie notes that the man would have lived if the ship was not so wet and cold.

=== Elizabeth (1836) ===
In 1836, he was appointed to the Elizabeth by request. It was an all-female convict ship but the women were “wild and defiant” and he was almost stabbed by one of them before he left. Despite the chaos, there were no deaths

== Legacy ==
Robert Espie's most influential legacy that he left behind is his medical journals describing service on convict ships to Australia. These ships populated the penal colonies of the UK. The journals provide a first-hand account of what life was like for the surgeons and the convicts during the journey.
