= Tereitannano =

Coordinates: 3°51′36″N 159°21′53″W

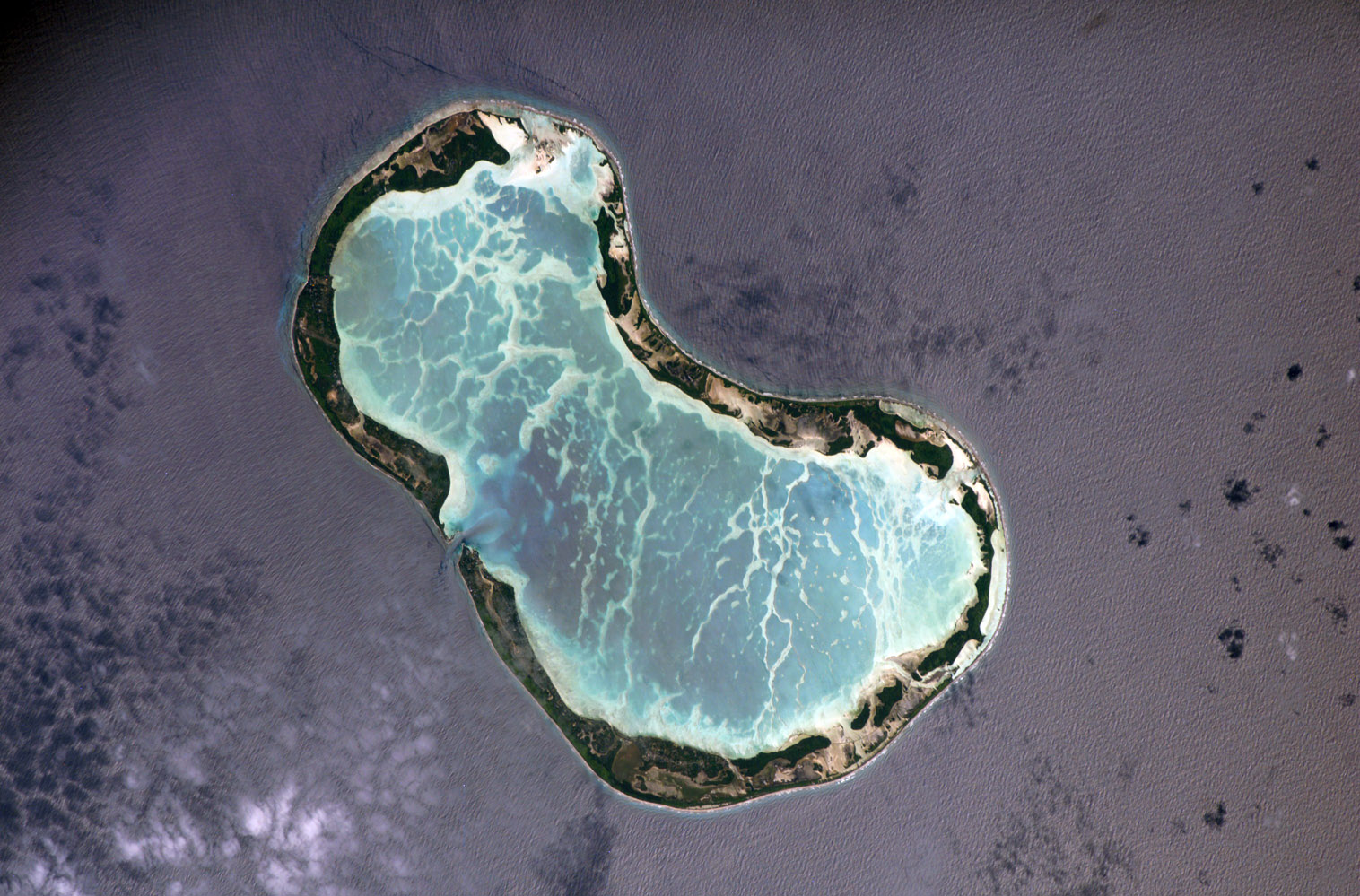

Tereitannano is a settlement located on Tabuaeran atoll, Kiribati. Tenenebo is to the north; with Aramari to the south.

In the 2010 census 168 people were recorded as living in Tereitannano.
