= Mwanuku =

Coordinates: 3.816668°N 159.325475°W

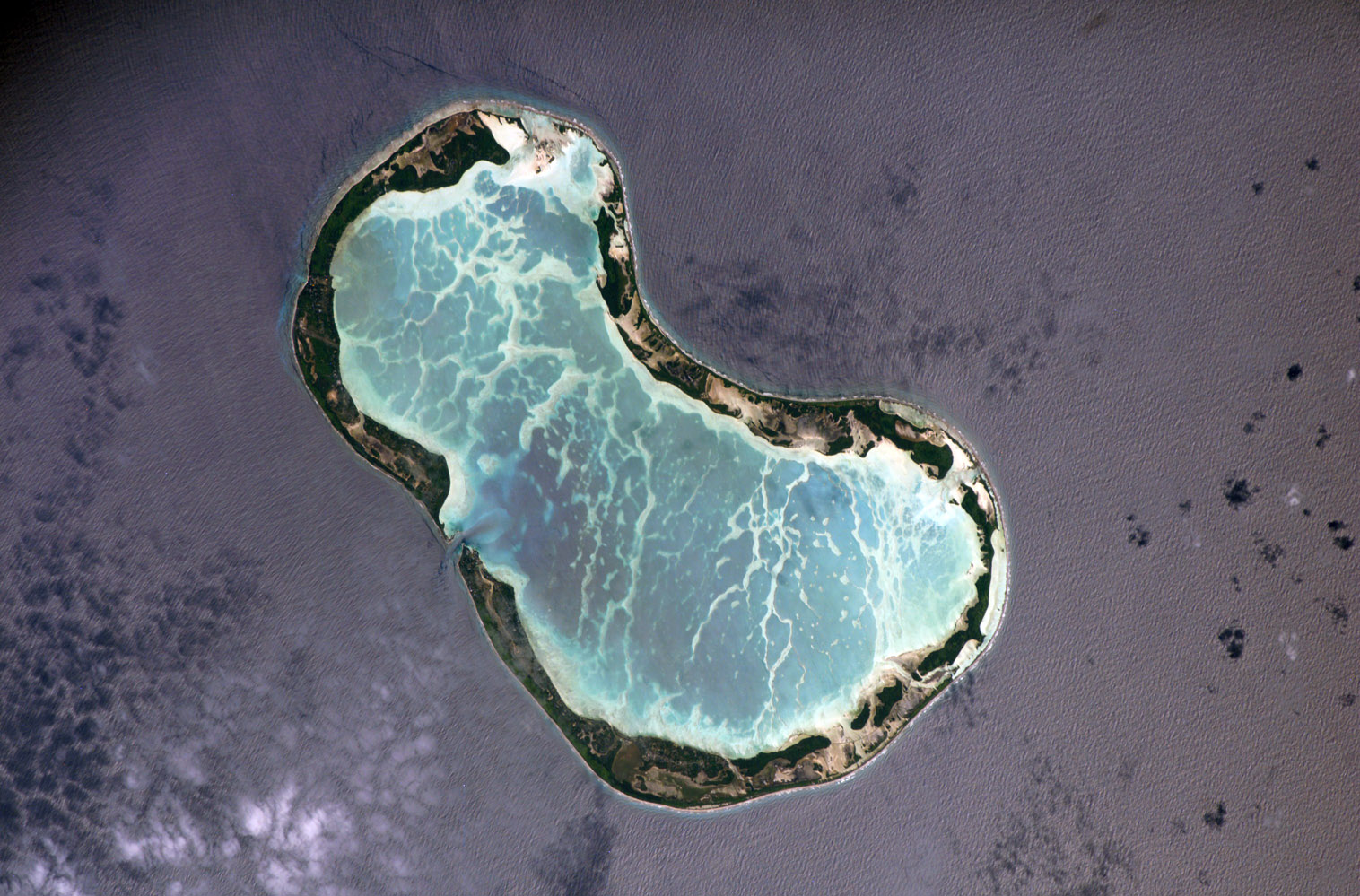

Mwanuku or Manuku or Eten is a settlement located on Tabuaeran atoll, Kiribati. Eten is the most south village on the atoll. Aramari is the village to north.

In the 2010 census 184 people were recorded as living in Eten.
