= Betania, Kiribati =

Coordinates: 3°51′00″N 159°21′00″W

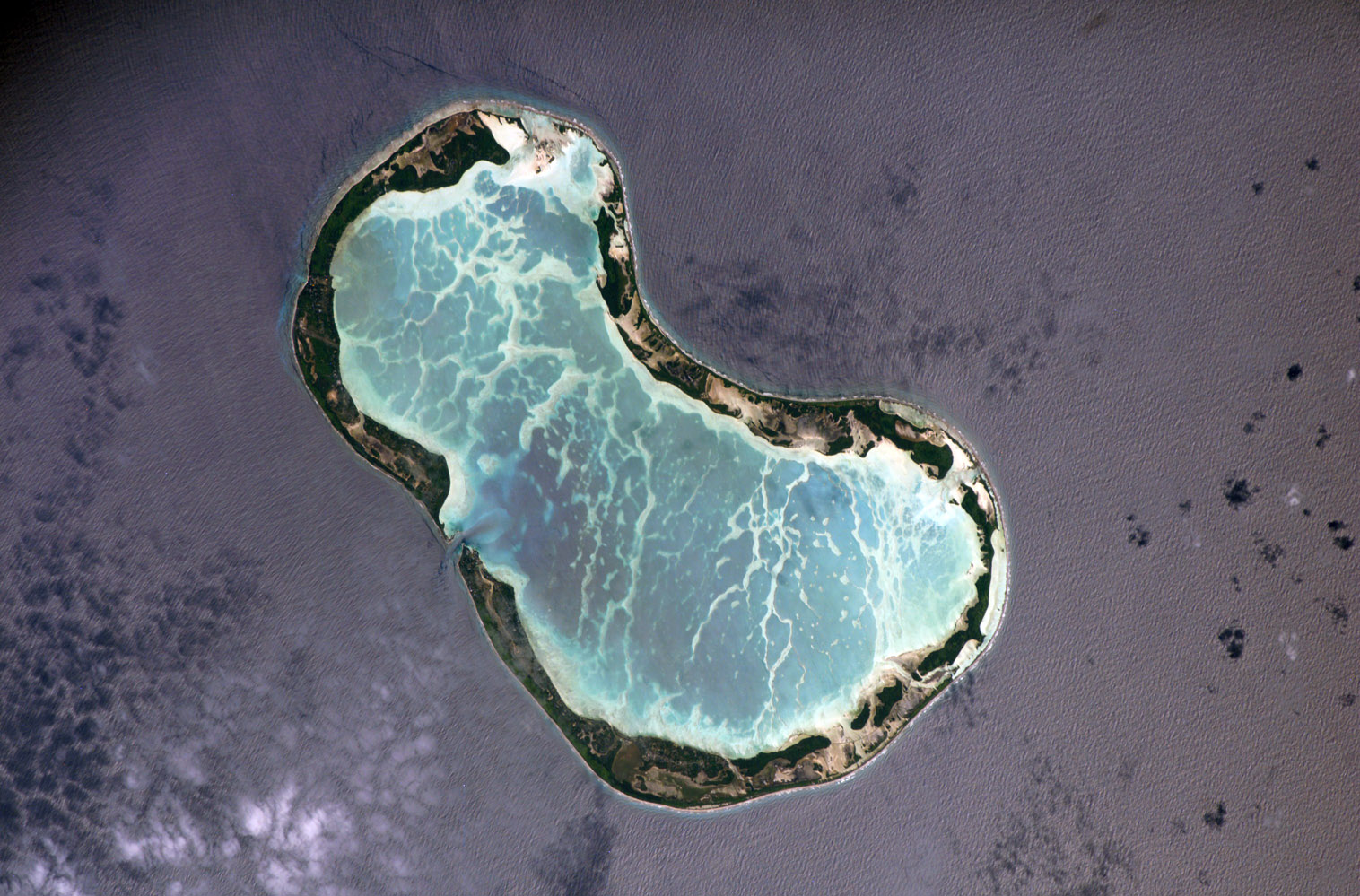

Betania is a settlement located on Tabuaeran atoll, Kiribati in the central Pacific Ocean.

Tereitaki is to the north; with Paelau (the administrative centre of the atoll) to the south.

In the 2010 census 175 people were recorded as living in Betania.
