= Tereitaki =

Settlement in Kiribati

Coordinates: 3°51′36″N 159°21′53″W

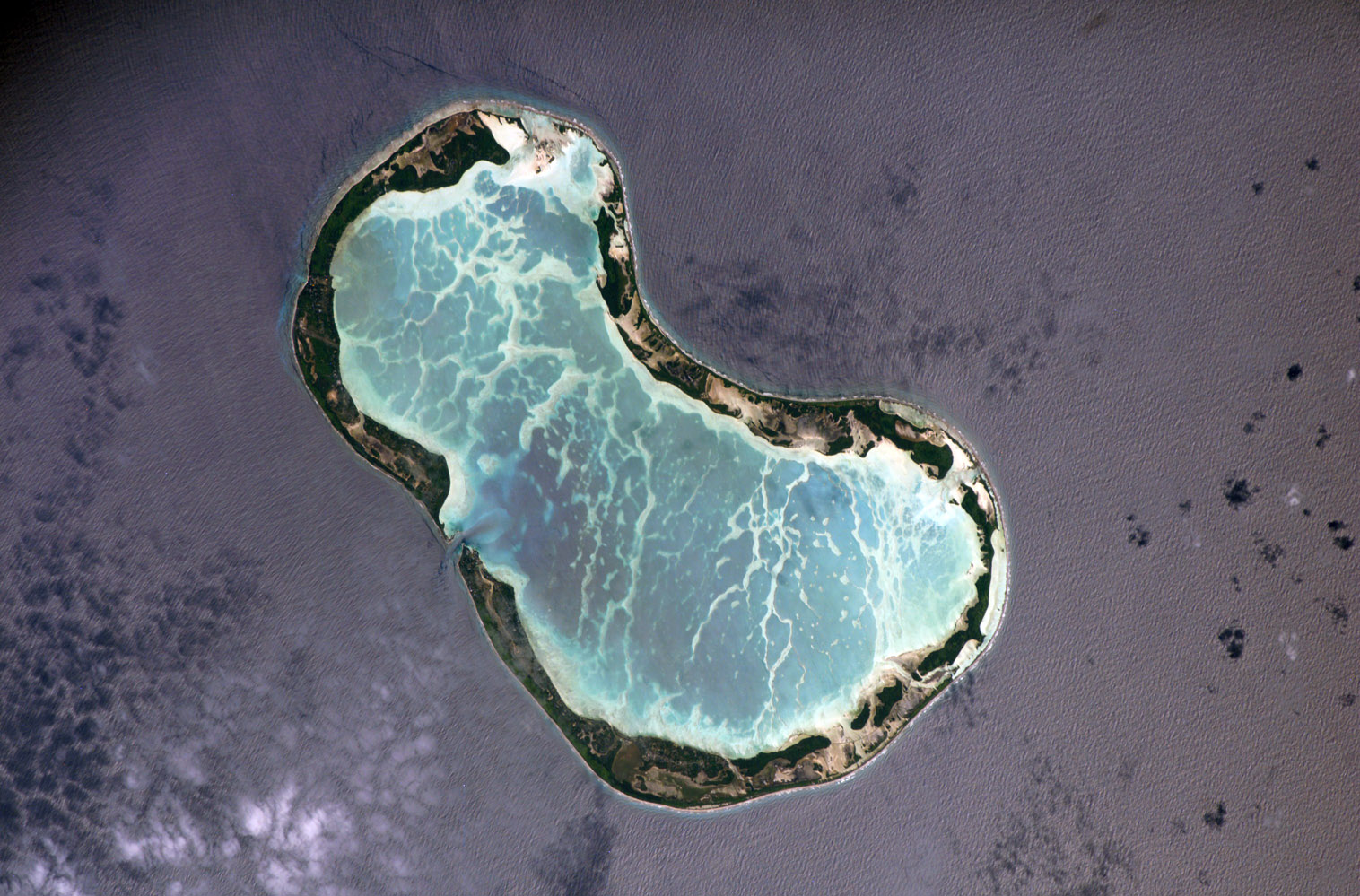

Tereitaki is a settlement located towards the north end of Tabuaeran atoll, Kiribati. Napari is the northernmost settlement; with Betania to the south.

In the 2015 census 505 people were recorded as living in Tereitaki, making it the most populous of the island’s nine villages.
