= Napari =

Settlement in Kiribati

Coordinates: 3°54′N 159°23′W

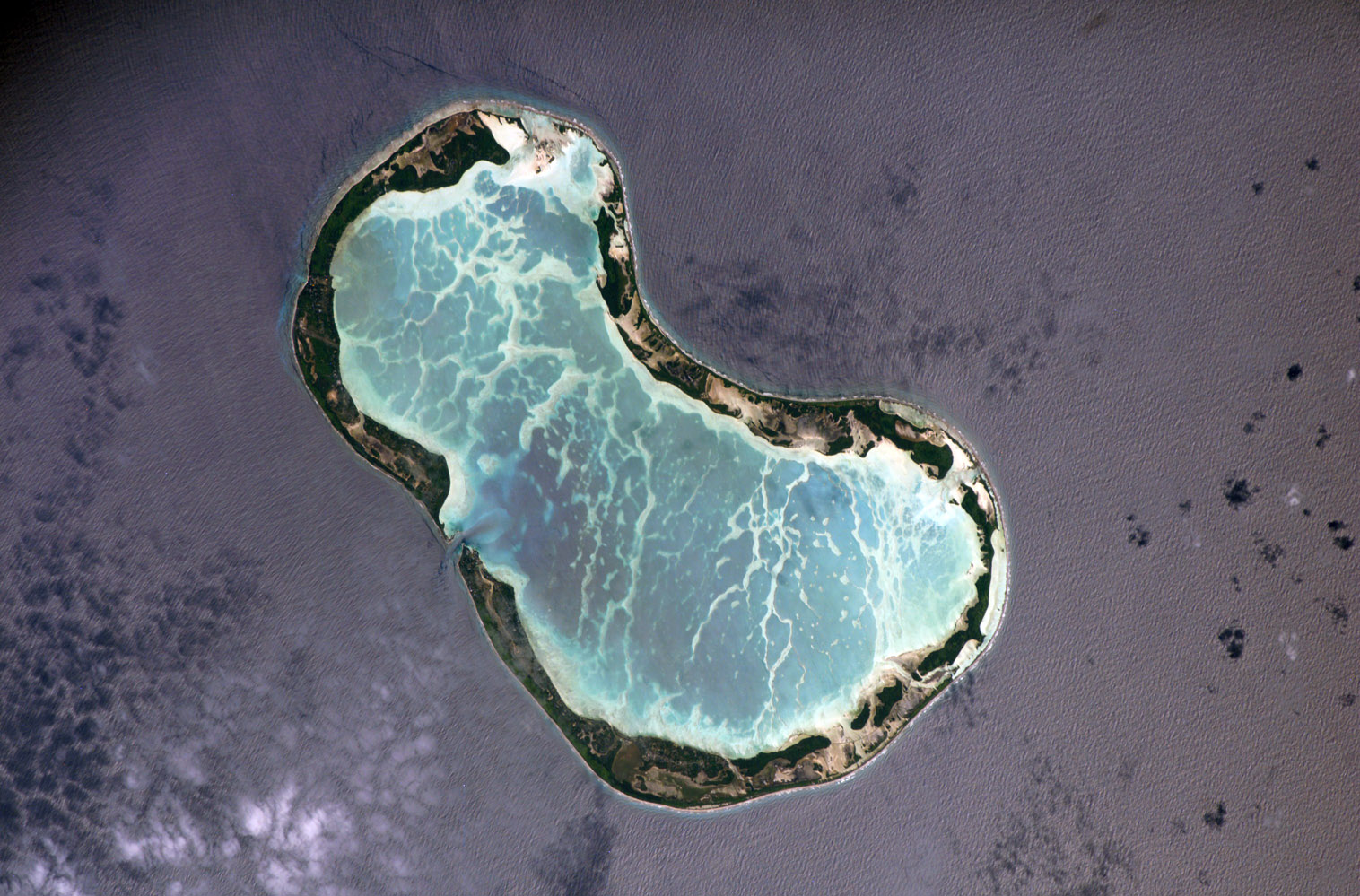
Tabuaeran atoll

Napari or Napali is a settlement located at the north end of Tabuaeran atoll, Kiribati. In the 2002 census 194 people were recorded as living in Napali. While Napali was not listed in the 2010 census as having any residents, the city of Tereitaki on the southern Napali was reported as having 346 inhabitants.
