= Rambler (1813 ship) =

History

United States
- Name: Rambler
- Owner: Benjamin Rich
- Builder: Calvin Turner, Medford (in S. Lapham's yard)
- Launched: 1813
- Fate: Currently unknown

General characteristics
- Tons burthen: 317, or 31765/94 (bm)
- Complement: 30–40, or 50
- Armament: 10 or 16 guns

Rambler was launched at Medford, Massachusetts, in 1813. She may have engaged in one voyage as a privateer, but then made a voyage to China as a letter of marque. On that voyage she captured several British merchantmen, at least two of which she released. She captured one that gave rise to an incident between the British East India Company (EIC), Royal Navy, and the Chinese government. Rambler returned to the United States in 1815, and her subsequent history is currently obscure.

== Origins ==
Captain Benjamin Rich had sold a brig named Rambler to Amos Binney, the agent for the United States Navy on 3 July 1813, for $18,000, exclusive of armament. This vessel became USS Rattlesnake.

He then had a Medford shipbuilder, Calvin Turner, build him a new Rambler, in a process that took only 36 days.

== Career ==
Rambler captured Union, Rennie, master, at 43°N 49°W on 9 March 1814, as Union was sailing from Jamaica to Glasgow.

HMS Curlew recaptured Union off Cape Sable. Unfortunately, Union was lost off Sambro Island Light during the night of 31 March. Only a few bags of cotton and some rigging were saved. (Note: Union was probably the vessel of 292 tons (bm), launched at Shields in 1800. Her master was listed as Rennison, changing to Whittaker, and her owner was Wilson & Co. She was a Cowes transport and was armed with six 18-pounder carronades.)

On 30 April 1814, Captain Nathaniel Snow and others brought libel for condemnation in the United States court at Boston for one case of goods taken from Union ‘which she did seize, take and capture, mounting ten carriage guns, and about 280 tons burthen with a cargo of cotton, coffee and various other articles of merchandise. The case of goods in question contained lace shawls, dresses and handkerchiefs which brought $1800 at auction.’

Shortly thereafter, a group of Boston merchants, headed by J. & T.H. Perkins and Bryant & Sturgis, dispatched three letters-of-marque to Canton: Rambler, ship Jacob Jones, and schooner Tamaamaah (contemporary spelling of Kamehameha). The three carried instructions to the American vessels blockaded at Whampoa.

Rambler, S.B. Edes, master, encountered Madeira, Roberts, master, on 7 June. Madeira had been sailing from Madeira to Nova Scotia when she encountered Rambler at 14°N 75°W. Edes plundered Madeira of between 70 and 90 casks of wine (accounts differ), and some other goods and then let her proceed; Madeira reached Liverpool, Nova Scotia, on 13 July. Rambler had not had enough men to send her to the United States.

As Rambler was coming towards Canton she captured Arabella. Edes wrote from Canton on 6 December, 'Our prize (the ship "Arabella") arrived at Macao the same day we arrived at Canton and was taken possession of by the Portuguese government and given up to the British Admiral on this station. I have protested against this proceeding, and hope a proper representation will be made to the Portuguese government, who ought in justice to pay us the amount she was insured for (60,000 rupees eighteen days out).'

The Arabella incident: The situation was a little more complex than Edes's quote might suggest. On the way to Canton, on 24 August, Rambler encountered the British brig Arabella, Captain Price, which was sailing from Bengal to Sumatra. Rambler captured Arabella, put a prize crew of some five men on board, and took Price and most of his men onto Rambler. Edes also removed five chests of opium, 16 bales of Madras goods, and 25 boxes of medicines, etc.

The two vessels then sailed in company to Canton. As they approached Canton they noticed that the British frigate HMS Doris was there. Edes sent Arabella to Macao to take shelter under the Portuguese guns. The Portuguese governor ordered Arabella out of Portuguese waters and put a pilot on board and some armed men for her protection. The American told the pilot that Arabella was an American ship that had been sailing between Bengal and Batavia but that adverse weather had sent her north to shelter at Canton. When Arabella anchored outside Portuguese waters, Doris sent a boarding party to examine her; as they approached, the American prize crew left in a boat and reached Rambler at Whampoa. The Chinese government took Doris's seizure of Arabella as an attack by the British on an American vessel and remonstrated with the EIC. When the EIC officials pointed out that they had no control over the actions of the Royal Navy. The Chinese government then forbade Chinese to work for the EIC. The issue escalated with Chinese batteries firing some pro forma shots at Doris, and Doris firing one gun, but without shot. The English withdrew from Canton, stopping trade. Eventually the Chinese and the British came to agreement that henceforth American vessels would not be permitted sell at Canton prize goods from British vessels. Jacob Jones had on board 40 chests of opium, $10,000 in specie, and some other goods.

Captain O'Brien found he could not sell his prize, Arabella, on the China coast. He received orders to proceed to Malacca after his replacement had arrived. He wanted to take Arabella with him to try to sell her in Malaya but the night before they were to leave a severe gale caused Arabella to break her cables. She then broke up on nearby rocks.

Return to the United States: Rambler, Jacob Jones, and Tamaamaah, having delivered their orders to the merchant vessels to remain until peace was declared, then loaded cargoes. On the night of 17 January 1815, they moved down river from Whampoa. As they did so, they passed two British men-of-war and about twenty armed East Indiamen that fired on them.

On 19 March, on her way home, Rambler captured "the Morley transport", which was coming from Algoa Bay. Edes plundered Morley and then gave her up. One account (incorrectly) names the transport Mosely, and describes her as of sixteen 18-pounder carronades and 20 or 30 men, and sailing in ballast. Rambler plundered her of articles of not much value before releasing her.

A contemporary account from Boston, dated 8 May stated, “Arrived the elegant letter-of-marque brig Rambler, Samuel B. Edes, Esq. commander, 108 days from Canton . . . . The Rambler has not seen a cruizer of any kind since she left Canton! . . . . The Rambler has performed her voyage in 11 months and 20 days. She has 10 guns & 40 men.”–Essex Register, May 10, 1815.

A second contemporary account from Boston, dated 13 May, stated, “Three vessels which sailed from Canton in company, all bound for Boston, have arrived there within a few hours of each other, after a passage of 9,000 miles. The following is the order in which they came in; the brig Rambler on Monday, the ship Jacob Jones on Tuesday, and the brig Tamaamaah on Wednesday–“–Baltimore Patriot, May 15, 1815.

Rambler, Jacob Jones, and Tamaamaah arrived at Boston on 3 & 4 May, after peace had been declared. They sold their cargoes at high prices. (Note: On the way to Canton Jacob Jones, John Roberts, master, captured two vessels off the coast of Borneo that were carrying Bengal opium. Jacob Jones took the opium on board and let her prey go. At Canton she could have sold it, but to avoid suit in American courts brought the opium back with her to Boston. There the opium was condemned as a lawful prize to Jacob Jones's owners; they sold the opium to be smuggled back to China. The two British vessels, both coming from Penang, were the ship Adele and the brig Bourwan. Adele was carrying gold dust and Bourwan opium. Jacob Jones captured Adele in Pontianak harbour. The cargoes sold for $90,000 on Jacob Jones's return to Boston and represented "one of the greatest voyages ever made from the United States.")
