= Fanning Raid =

1914 German naval raid in the Pacific during WWI

Coordinates: 3°51′36″N 159°21′52″W

- Part of World War I
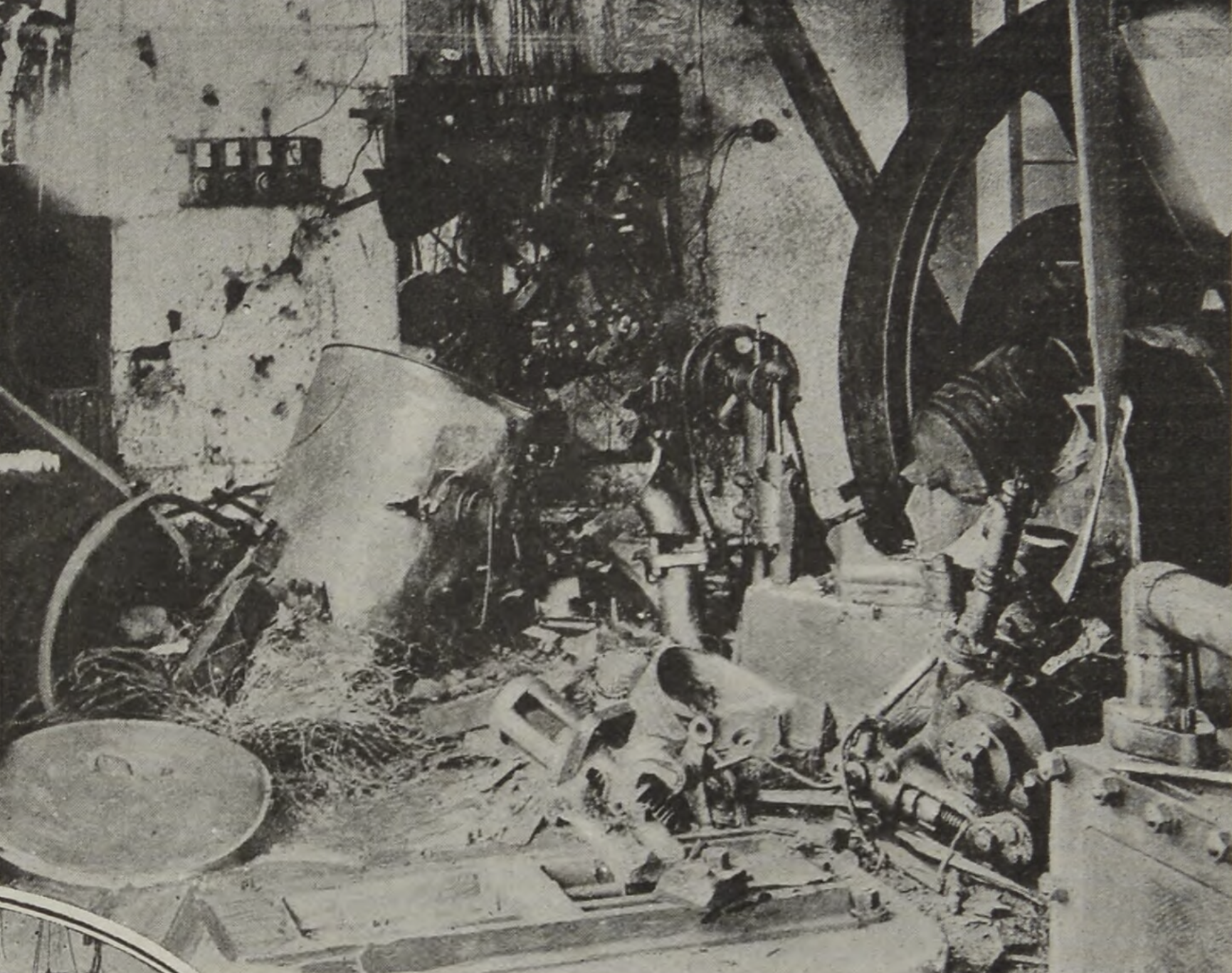
- Dynamo-room at Fanning cable station destroyed during the raid
Date	7 September 1914
Location	Fanning Island, Pacific Ocean
Result	German victory

Belligerents
United Kingdom; Gilbert and Ellice Islands	German Empire

Commanders and leaders
(British Empire) Superintendent A. Smith	(German Empire) Maximilian von Spee

Strength
Unknown	Light cruiser Nürnberg

Casualties and losses
Communications station destroyed 2,000 pounds in material damage	None

The Fanning Raid was an action of the First World War involving a successful German attack on the Fanning island cable relay station. Vice Admiral Maximilian von Spee sent the light cruiser SMS Nürnberg along with the collier Titania to attack the station on 7 September 1914 while his East Asia Squadron was crossing the Pacific, en route to South America.

== Background ==
Fanning island was annexed by Great Britain in 1888.

The British Pacific Cable Board built a relay station for its central Pacific underwater telegraph cable on the island. The station was a part of the All Red Line, connecting Australia, New Zealand, and Canada to Great Britain.

At the outbreak of World War I in August 1914, the German East Asia Squadron, commanded by Vice Admiral Maximilian von Spee, departed from its base at Qingdao. Spee intended to take his ships to South America, where British merchant shipping might be easily raided. While crossing the Pacific on 6 September, Spee detached the light cruiser SMS Nürnberg and the auxiliary cruiser Titania to investigate the British installation at Fanning and to destroy the wireless station there.

== Raid ==
SMS Nürnberg

In the early morning of 7 September 1914, the German cruiser SMS Nürnberg, approached Fanning flying a French flag. Noticing the French flag the staff hoisted a British flag on the flagstaff. By the time the employees noticed the deception, German sailors already landed on the island. Shortly before being arrested operators managed to send a warning to Suva: "It's the Nürnberg; they are firing."

The Germans then severely damaged the cable station, rendering it inoperable, and cut the island's undersea communications cables. They also smashed spare parts and instruments. The engine was completely destroyed with the use of small arms fire and explosives. Documentation as well as a cache of rifles and ammunition was confiscated. The flagstaff was also cut down. Islanders remarked on the professionalism and courtesy of the German force. Material damage totaled $150,000.

Communication was reestablished in two weeks.
