= Dollabarat =

- Etymology: Pierre Dollabarat, captain who discovered the reef by accident on 7 March 1788

Location
- Country: Portugal
- Autonomous region: Azores
- Islands: Eastern Group

Basin features
- River system: Azores Plateau
- Designation

Ramsar Wetland
- Official name: Ilhéus das Formigas e Recife Dollabarat
- Designated: 16 June 2008
- Reference no.: 1804

The Dollabarat Reef is a shoal situated 5 km (3 nautical miles) south-southeast of the Formigas Islets on the Formigas Bank in the Azores archipelago.

== History ==
The reef is named after Pierre Dollabarats, Basque captain of the ship Maria de Sebourre, who accidentally discovered the reef when his small boat wrecked on it on 7 March 1788.

Since 16 June 2008, Dollabarat Reef and the neighboring Formigas Islets have been recognized as a Ramsar Convention wetland under the name Ilhéus das Formigas e Recife Dollabarat (reference number 1804).

== Geography ==
The Dollabarat Reef is part of the Formigas Islets Nature Reserve which covers 35.42 square kilometres (13.68 mi^{2}). Around the Formigas Reserve, including the Dollabarat, sea cliffs fall rapidly between 50–70 metres (160–230 ft), although gently to the north and south. The gradient around the Dollabarat is less accentuated.

The highest point is 3 metres (9.8 ft) below sea level. Dollabarat Reef is one of the higher parts of the Formigas Bank, a seamount with similar volcanic origins as the Azores islands. The reef was formed from rocks emerging from volcanic activity in submarine volcanoes and deeper spaces composed of drained lava holes with an irregular morphology. The deeper parts of the Dollabarat are covered with large rocks and irregular plains covered with a carpet of seaweeds.

Given the relatively shallow waters, the reef is a peril to navigation, similar to sandy shorelines.

=== Biome ===
The strong currents, deep waters, and presence of sharks make diving difficult for those not familiar with open-ocean diving. The sub-tidal zone is a shelter for many fish species, and the abundance of black coral located about 15 metres (49 ft) deep in the eastern part of the reef has resulted in a small reef habitat.

There is a large abundance of sea animals in the vicinity. In addition to species of sharks, other aquatic animals such as sea chub, trigger fish, mantas, turtles and dolphins have been observed in the waters around Dollabarat, including the Atlantic goliath grouper (usually found in depths between 10–40 m). The floor of the seamount is generally covered by a dense layer of seaweed, dominated by the Cystoseira species, a seaweed found in deeper areas. In shallower depths less than 50 metres (160 ft) from the surface there are populations of Laminaria (large colonies of chestnut seaweeds). The Department of Oceanography and Fisheries at the University of the Azores (Ponta Delgada) monitors and studies these species annually through scientific missions to the reef and surrounding islets.
