= Paelau =

Human settlement in Kiribati

Coordinates: 3.857048°N 159.361599°W

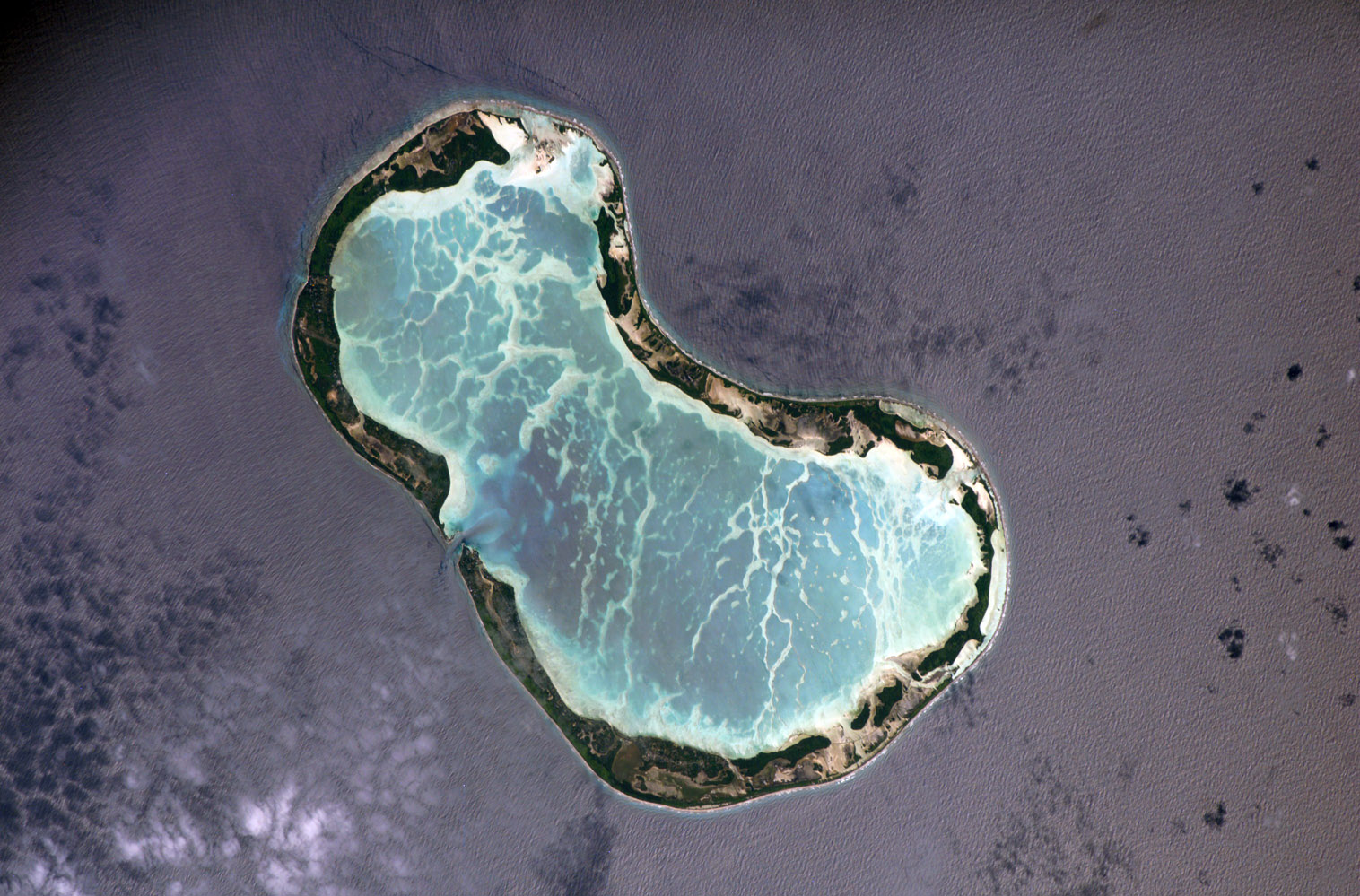

Paelau is a settlement located on Tabuaeran atoll, Kiribati. It is located on the western side of the atoll, south of a passage into the lagoon, with Betania to the north and Aontenaa to the south.

It is the administrative centre of the atoll, where the main health clinic is located. In the 2010 census 200 people were recorded as living in Paelau.

It was formerly known as Napia or English Harbour.
