= Aontenaa =

Settlement on Tabuaeran atoll, Kiribati

Coordinates: 3.849868°N 159.360967°W

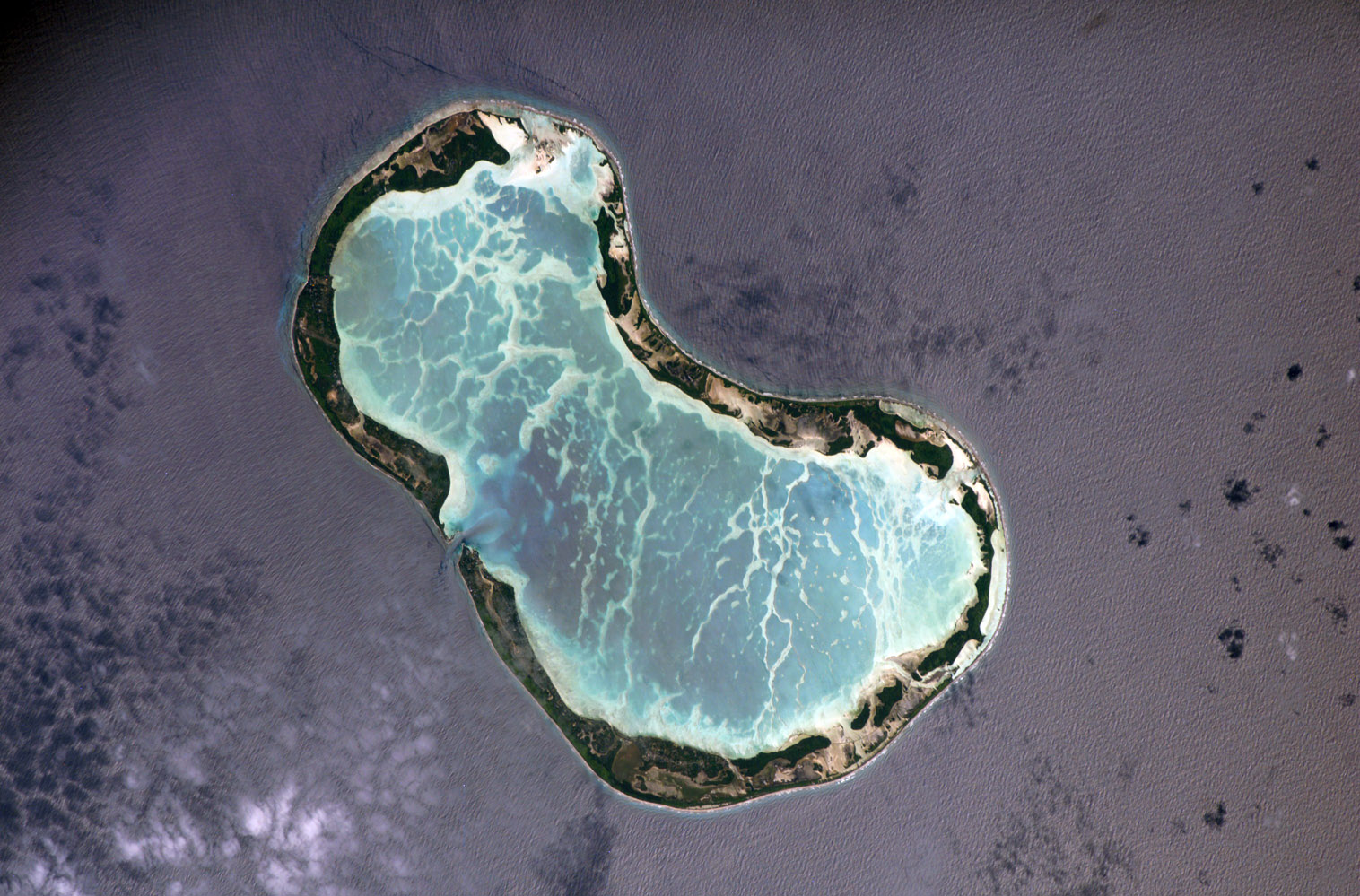

Aontenaa is a settlement located on Tabuaeran atoll, Kiribati. Paelau is to the north; with Tenenebo to the south.

In the 2010 census 190 people were recorded as living in Aontenaa.
