= Morley (1811 ship) =

- The ship Morley and other vessels (1828), William Adolphus Knell, National Maritime Museum

History

United Kingdom
- Name: Morley
- Owner: 1811:Morley; 1828:Ward & Co.; 1832:Douglas & Co.; 1836:Heath & Co.
- Builder: John Dudman, Deptford
- Launched: 3 October 1811
- Fate: Last listed 1855

General characteristics
- Tons burthen: 480, or 48381/94, or 490, or 492 (bm)
- Length: 121 ft 9 in (37.1 m)
- Beam: 30 ft 1 in (9.2 m)
- Armament: 8 × 18-pounder carronades

Morley was a merchantman launched in 1811 at Deptford as a West Indiaman. In 1813 she was under contract to the Transport Board when she captured an American vessel, which capture gave rise to an interesting court case. In early 1815 an American letter of marque captured, plundered, and released her. She then made six voyages to Australia transporting convicts. On her fifth voyage she introduced whooping-cough to Australia. After her sixth voyage she sailed to China and then brought a cargo back to England for the British East India Company (EIC). She continued to sail to Australia and elsewhere and is last listed in 1855.

== Career ==
Morley appears in Lloyd's Register in 1812 with Morgan, master, Morley, owner, and trade London–Jamaica.

=== Government transport ===
On 28 April 1812 John Morley chartered Morley to the Transport Board. The Transport Board then ordered Morley to sail to the East Indies.

On 1 February 1813 the American ship Rambler arrived at the Cape of Good Hope. She had been sailing from Manila when "The Transport Morley, Brown, Master" had captured her. The Vice admiralty court condemned her as a lawful prize to the Crown, but not Morley as Morley had not acquired a letter of marque. Morley's owners applied for an award. The Treasury agreed, and issued a warrant for £4738 to the Transportation Board on behalf of the owners. The Transportation Board advised the owners that it was keeping the money as Morley had been under contract to it. The owners appealed. It is not clear what the final decision was.

On 19 March 1815 the American letter-of-marque Rambler captured "the Morley transport", which was coming from Algoa Bay. The Americans plundered Morley and then gave her up. Rambler, which had been coming from China, returned to Boston, having captured several British ships. (Note: Rambler, S. Edes, master, was a brig of ten guns and 40 men. She had been launched at Boston in 1813.)

Morley then returned to trading as a West Indiaman to Jamaica.

=== Convict transport ===
Between 1816 and 1830 Morley made six voyages transporting convicts to Australia.

Convict voyage #1 (1816-1817): Captain Robert R. Brown sailed from England on 18 December 1816. Morley sailed via the Cape and arrived at Port Jackson on 16 April 1817. The surgeon on board was Robert Espie. The entire voyage took only 113 days, which set a new record. Morley transported 175 male convicts, with no deaths. She returned to England via Batavia.

Convict voyage #2 (1818): Captain Brown sailed from The Downs on 18 July 1818. Morley arrived at Port Jackson on 7 November. She had embarked 164 male convicts, with one death en route. She sailed for England in December 1818.

In 1820 T. Ward acquired Morley.

Convict voyage #3 (1820): Captain Brown sailed from London on 22 May 1820. She arrived at Hobart 99 days later, which established a record that would stand until 1837. She delivered one set of convicts to Hobart and then sailed with the remainder to Port Jackson, where she arrived on 30 September, for a total transit time of 113 days. She had embarked 121 female convicts and she landed 50 at Hobart and 71 at Port Jackson, with no deaths en route.

Convict voyage #4 (1822-1823): Captain George Holliday (or Halliday) sailed from The Downs on 25 September 1822 for Hobart. Morley arrived there on 11 January 1823. She had embarked 172 male convicts and she landed 170, having suffered two deaths en route.

On her return from Australia Morley traded between London and Calcutta under a license from the EIC. At some point prior to her next voyage transporting convicts Morley underwent extensive repairs that increased her burthen from 480 to 492 tons.

Convict voyage #5 (1827-1828): Captain Henry Williams sailed Dublin on 3 November 1828. Morley stopped at Teneriffe and then arrived at Port Jackson on 3 March 1828. She had embarked 195 male convicts and she landed 193, having suffered three convict deaths en route.

Unfortunately, on this voyage she introduced whooping cough to Australia. The children of the guards developed the illness and when Morley arrived there was contact with the shore before the authorities were advised and she was put into quarantine. By then it was too late and the disease spread widely in the colony with the result that several children died, including one of the sons of the governor, Lieutenant General Sir Ralph Darling.

Convict voyage #6 (1829-1830): Captain William Harrison sailed from The Downs on 10 August 1829 on a voyage under the auspices of the EIC. Morley arrived at Port Jackson on 3 December. She had embarked 200 convicts, all of whom survived the journey.

From Australia she sailed to China, arriving at Whampoa on 17 March 1830. Homeward bound, she crossed the Second Bar on 31 March, reached Saint Helena on 17 July, and arrived back at The Downs on 16 September.

=== Later career ===
Lloyd's Register for 1831 shows Morley's master changing from Harrison to J. Douglas. Her owner is still Ward & Co., and her trade is London–New South Wales. The 1832 volume of Lloyd's Register shows J. Douglas as master and owner, and her trade as London–Madras.

On 9 April 1832 Morley rescued the crew of the brig Zillah. Zillah, Martin, master was on a voyage from Dundee, Forfarshire to Saint Domingue when she struck a sunken rock off the Formigas, Western Islands. She was in a sinking states with seven feet of water in her hold when her crew abandoned her the next day. They saw her sink some hours after they had left her. Morley rescued Zyllah's crew and brought them to England.

Lloyd's Register for 1836 shows Morley's master as Douglas, changing to Evans, her owner as Heath & Co., and trade London–Bombay.

== Fate ==
Morley is last listed in Lloyd's Register in 1855 with J.R.Myhill, master, Heath & Co., owner, but without a trade.
