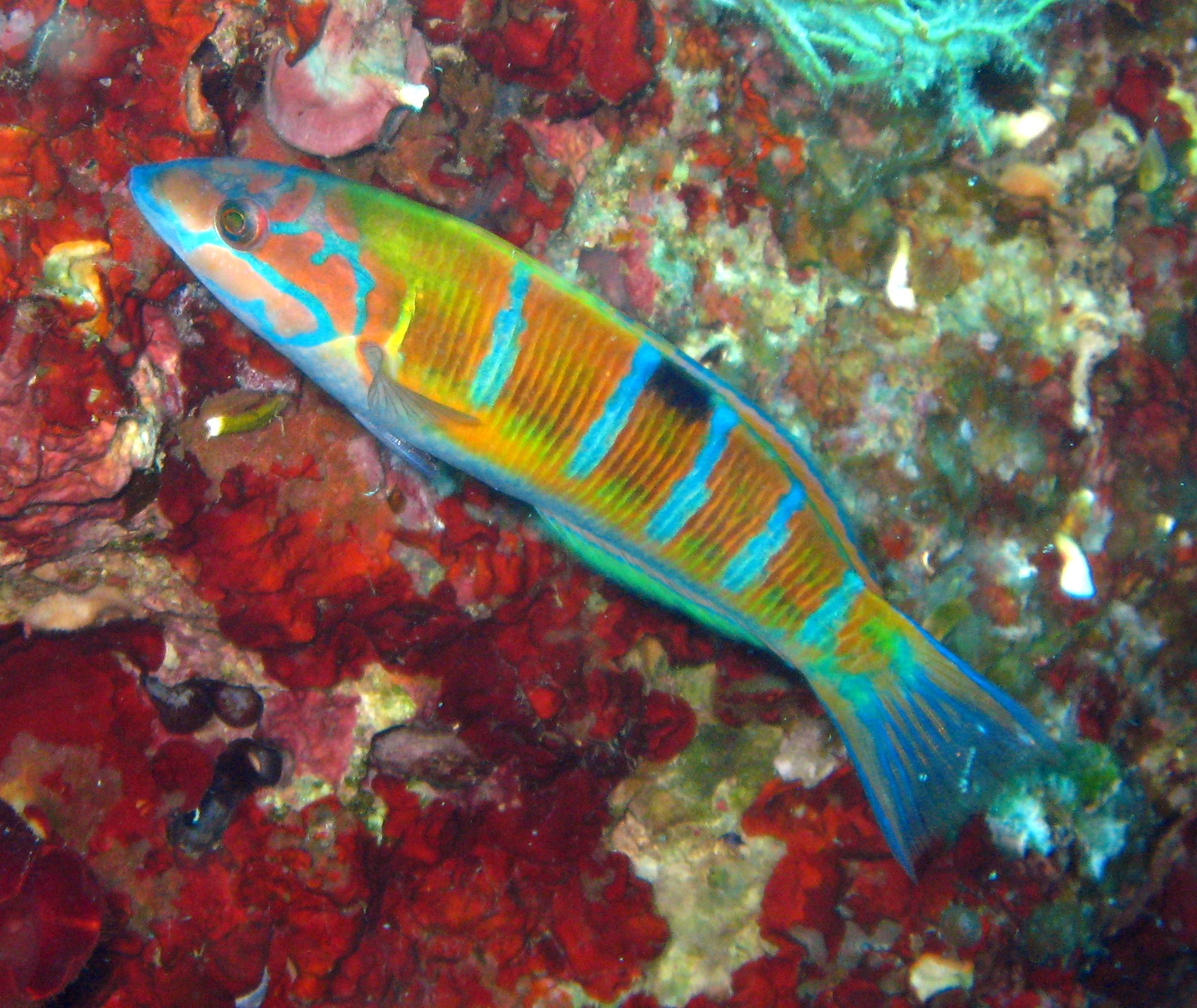
- female
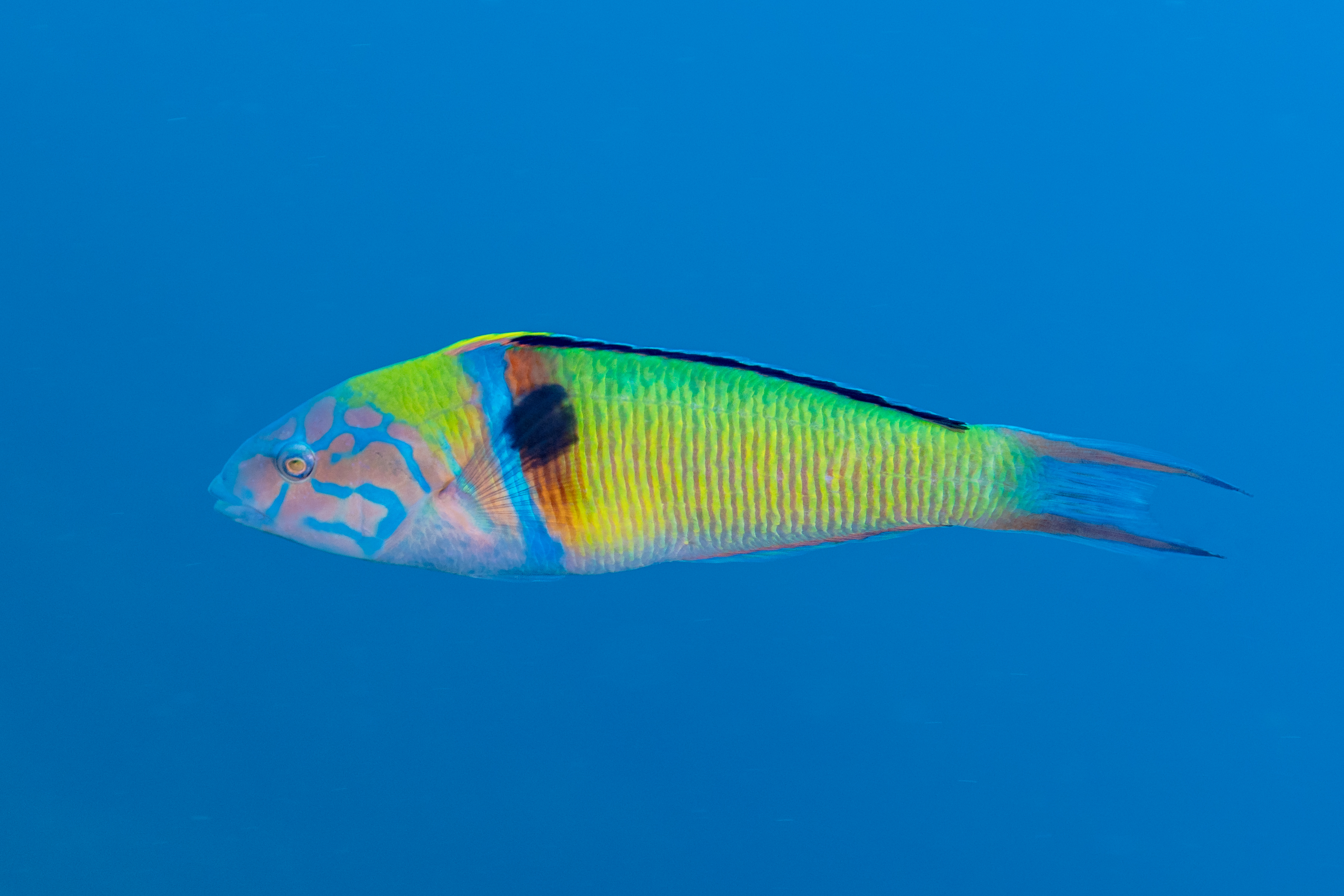
- male

Conservation status
- Least Concern (IUCN 3.1)

Scientific classification
- Kingdom: Animalia
- Phylum: Chordata
- Class: Actinopterygii
- Division: Teleostei
- Order: Labriformes
- Family: Labridae
- Genus: Thalassoma
- Species: T. pavo

Binomial name
- Thalassoma pavo (Linnaeus, 1758)

Synonyms
- List: Labrus pavo Linnaeus, 1758; Chlorichthys pavo (Linnaeus, 1758); Julis pavo (Linnaeus, 1758); Labrus syriacus Bloch & J. G. Schneider, 1801; Labrus leo Rafinesque, 1810; Julis squamimarginatus S. Bowdich, 1825; Julis turcica Risso, 1827; Julis blochii Valenciennes, 1839; Julis unimaculata R. T. Lowe, 1841; Thalassoma unimaculatum (R. T. Lowe, 1841); Julis unimaculata lineolata R. T. Lowe, 1841; Julis unimaculata taeniata R. T. Lowe, 1841; Thalassoma pavo taeniata (R. T. Lowe, 1841); Julis turcica torquata R. T. Lowe, 1843; Thalassoma pavo torquata (R. T. Lowe, 1843); Julis turcica lemniscata R. T. Lowe, 1843; Thalassoma pavo lemniscata (R. T. Lowe, 1843); Julis vulgaris Valenciennes, 1843

= Ornate wrasse =

Species of fish

The ornate wrasse (Thalassoma pavo) is a species of wrasse native to the rocky coasts of the eastern Atlantic Ocean and the Mediterranean Sea. This species, commonly known as the circus fish, is of minor importance to local commercial fisheries, is also popular as a game fish, and can be found in the aquarium trade.

== Taxonomy ==
The ornate wrasse was originally formally described in 1758 as Labrus pavo by Carolus Linnaeus in Volume X of the Systema Naturae and the type locality was given as Syria.

== Description ==
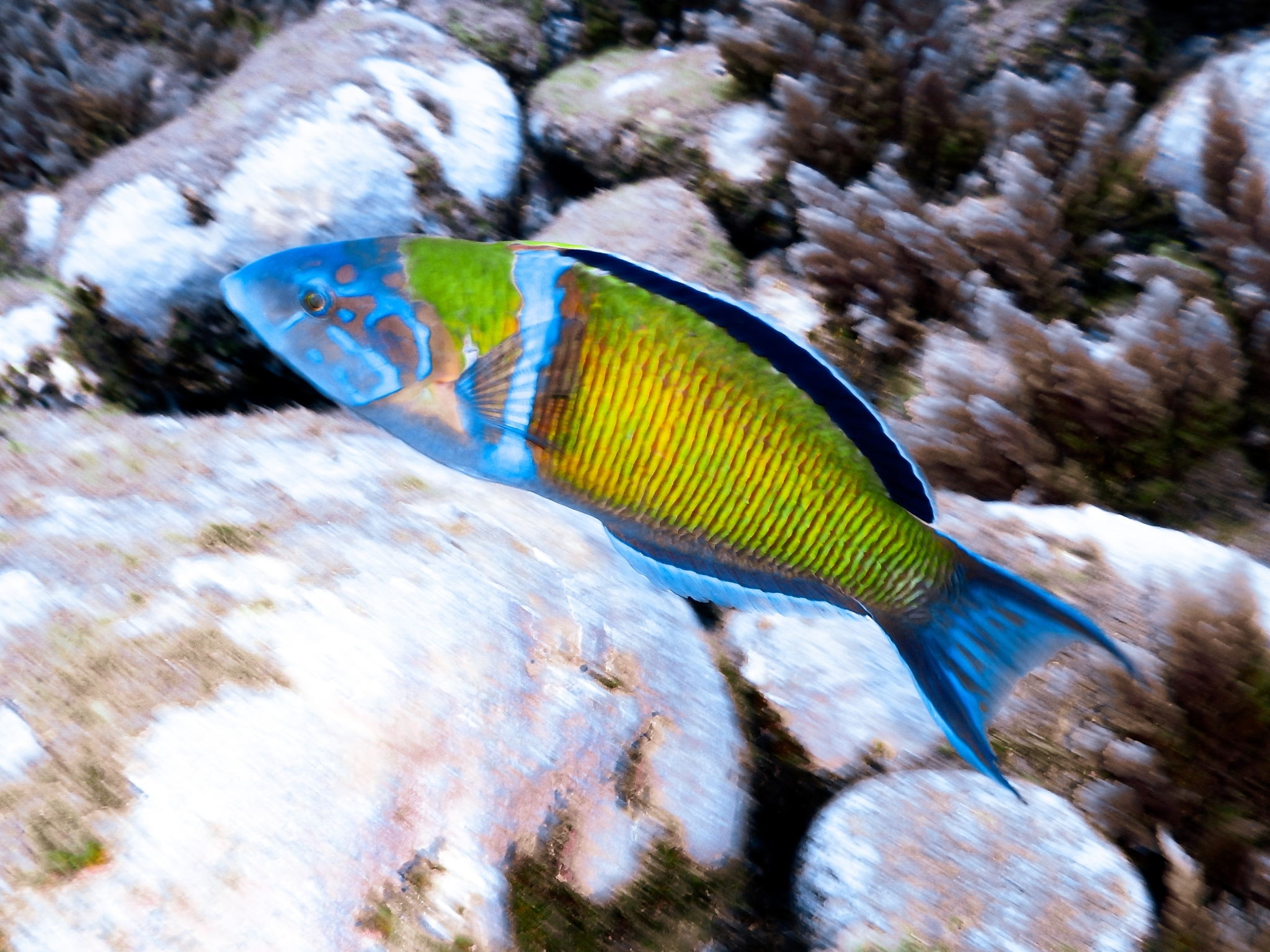
Male

The ornate wrasse shows sexual dichromatism. the females are greenish-brown with a dark bar on each scale and five bluish vertical stripes. Males have red heads with blue markings. Situated immediately to the rear of the pectoral fin they have a vertical blue stripe with red margins. The caudal fin in both sexes is turquoise. The juveniles are green overall and have a black spot halfway along the back, positioned immediately below the dorsal fin. The body is elongated and laterally compressed with a sharp, oval head. The snout is short with a small, terminal mouth and thick lips. In younger fish the caudal fin and as the fish matures it becomes concave with elongated outer rays forming filaments. It can reach 25 cm (9.8 in) in length, though most do not exceed 20 cm (7.9 in). The dorsal fin has eight spines and 12-13 soft rays while the anal fin has three spines and 10-12 soft rays.

== Distribution ==
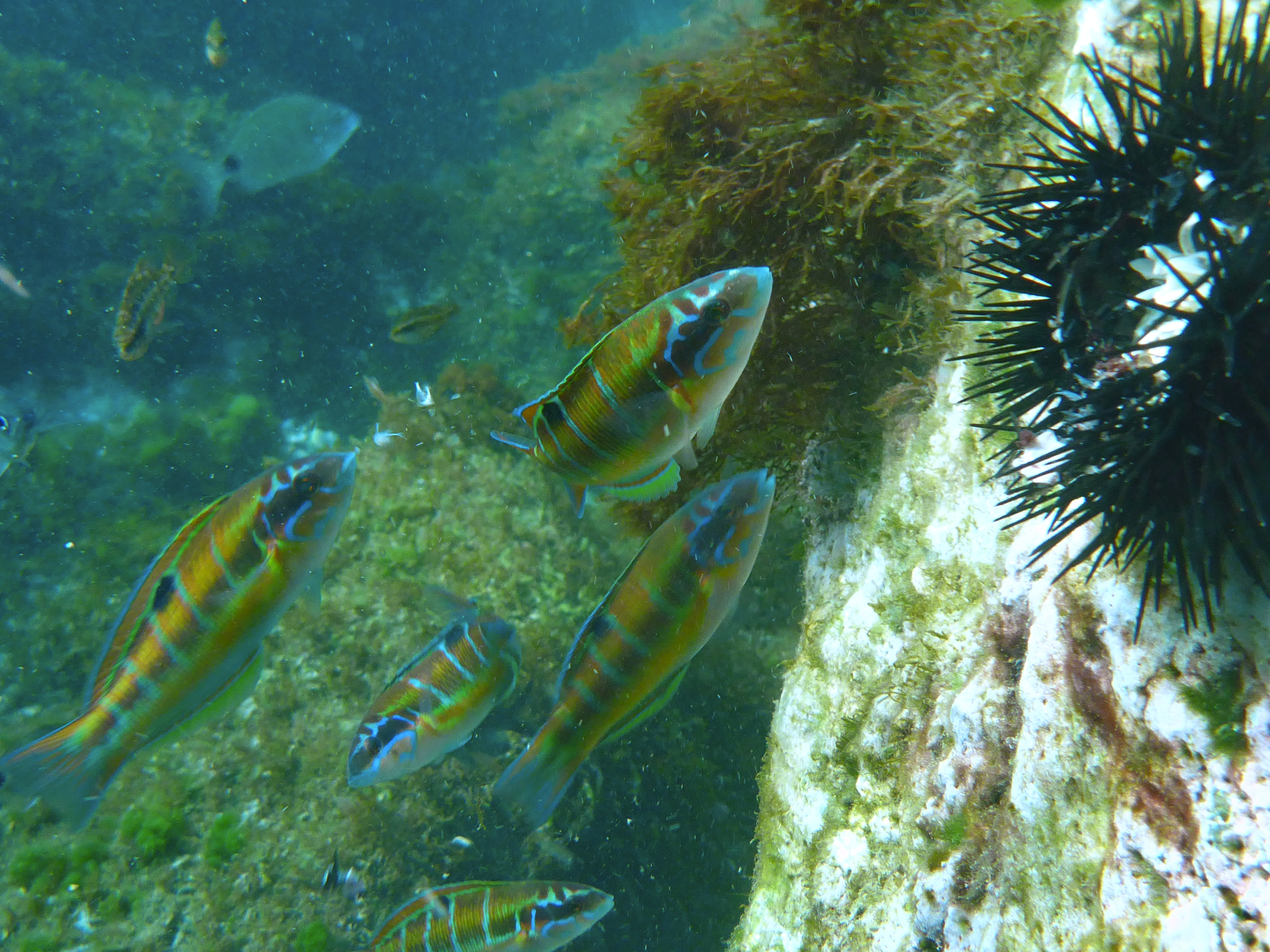
Females approaching a cracked open sea urchin, Spain

The ornate wrasse is a species of the eastern Atlantic Ocean and the Mediterranean Sea. In the eastern Atlantic it occurs from Portugal southwards along the coast of West Africa as far as Senegal. It also occurs around the Macaronesia, archipelagoes of the Cape Verde Islands, Canary Islands, Madeira, Salvage Islands and the Azores. In the Mediterranean it occurs all along the African and Asian coasts and most of the northern coasts except for the northern parts of the Adriatic and some parts of the north western Mediterranean. However, global warming may be allowing ornate wrasse to extend its range northwards and it has increasingly been collected in the Ligurian Sea and off Provence. It is absent from the Black Sea.

== Habitat and biology ==
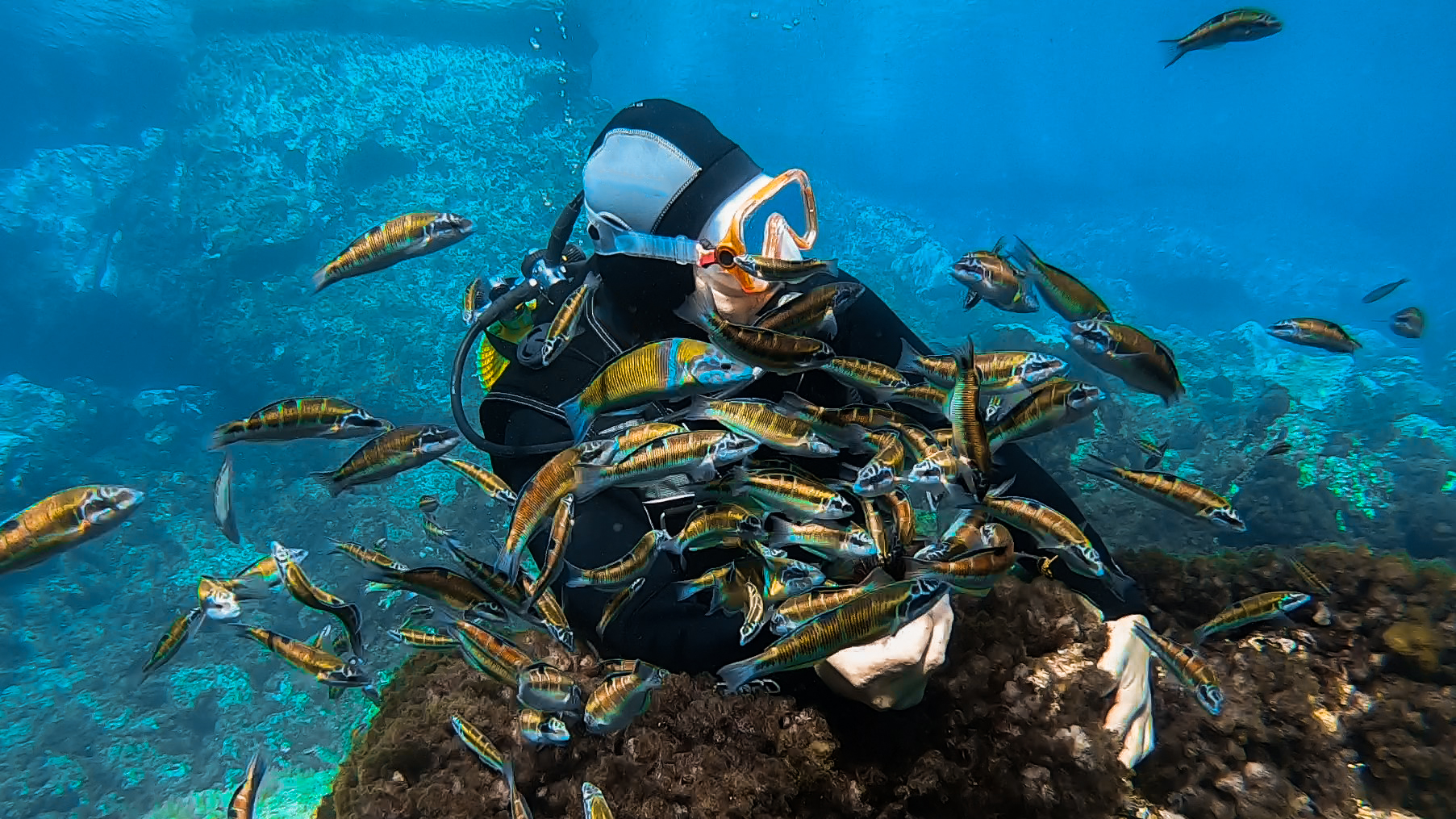
Group of ornate wrasses, Algeria

The ornate wrasse occurs in on rocky areas where there are growths of algae and Posidonia sea grass beds, it is found from 0 to 50 metres (0 to 164 ft). It can also be found living in anthropogenic structures including shipwrecks, piers and jetties. The females and the juvenile normally live in small groups while the adult males are solitary. In the breeding season the males become territorial and guard a harem. Its diet consists of small molluscs and crustaceans and the juveniles will act as cleaner fish, feeding on the ectoparasites taken off the skin of other fishes. As it hunts for this prey it swims with quick jerky movements. They bury into sandy areas at night by vigorously shaking their tail, spending the night on their sides in the sand.

The ornate wrasse is a protogynous hermaphrodite and females may transform into males which is signified by a change of colour. This means that the population is dominated by a large number of young, fertile females which can produce a large number of eggs. The older and larger solitary males are fewer in numbers as they suffer from a greater predation pressure. Spawning occurs in the spring and the eggs are pelagic.

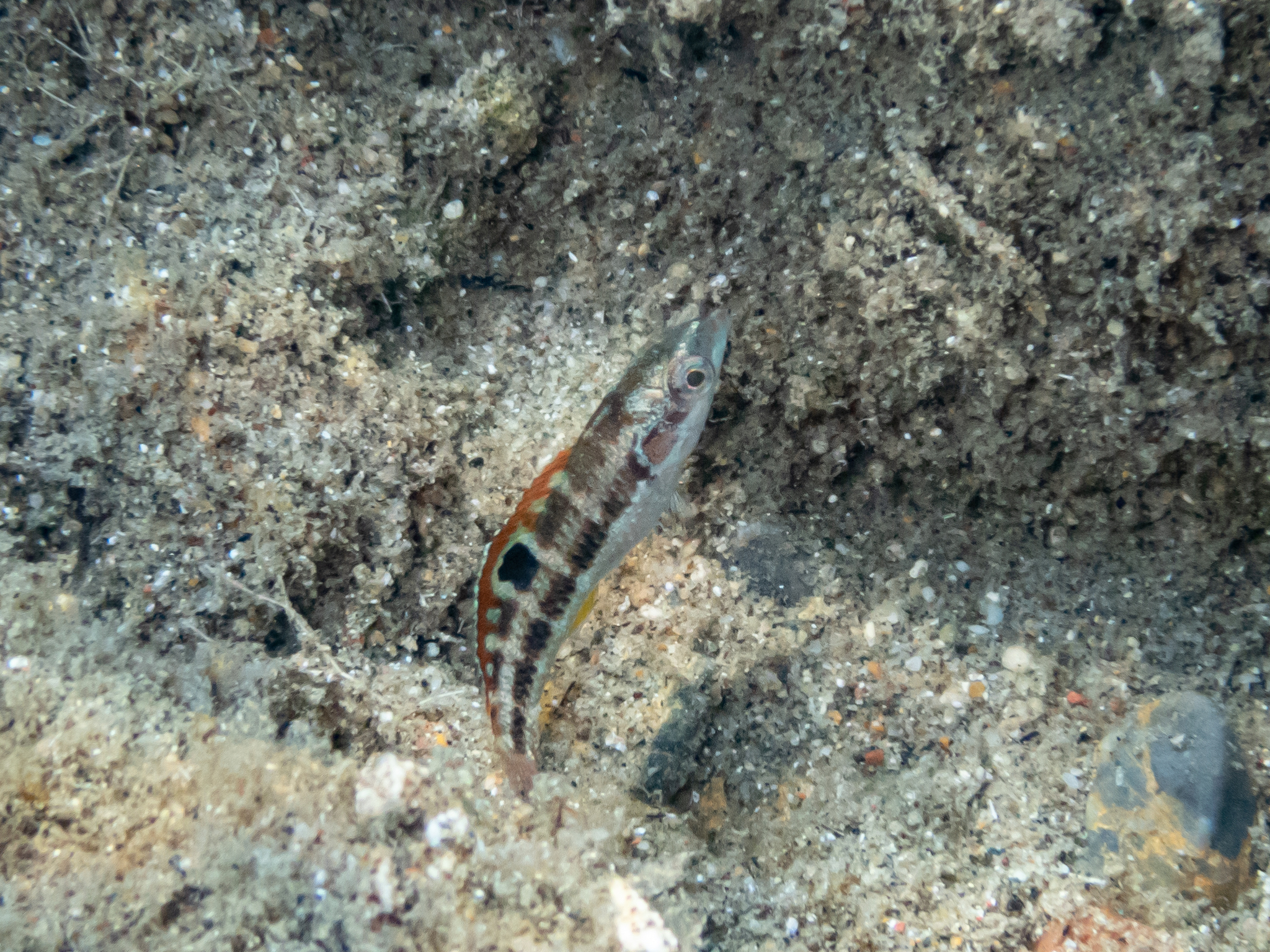
Juvenile, in Greece

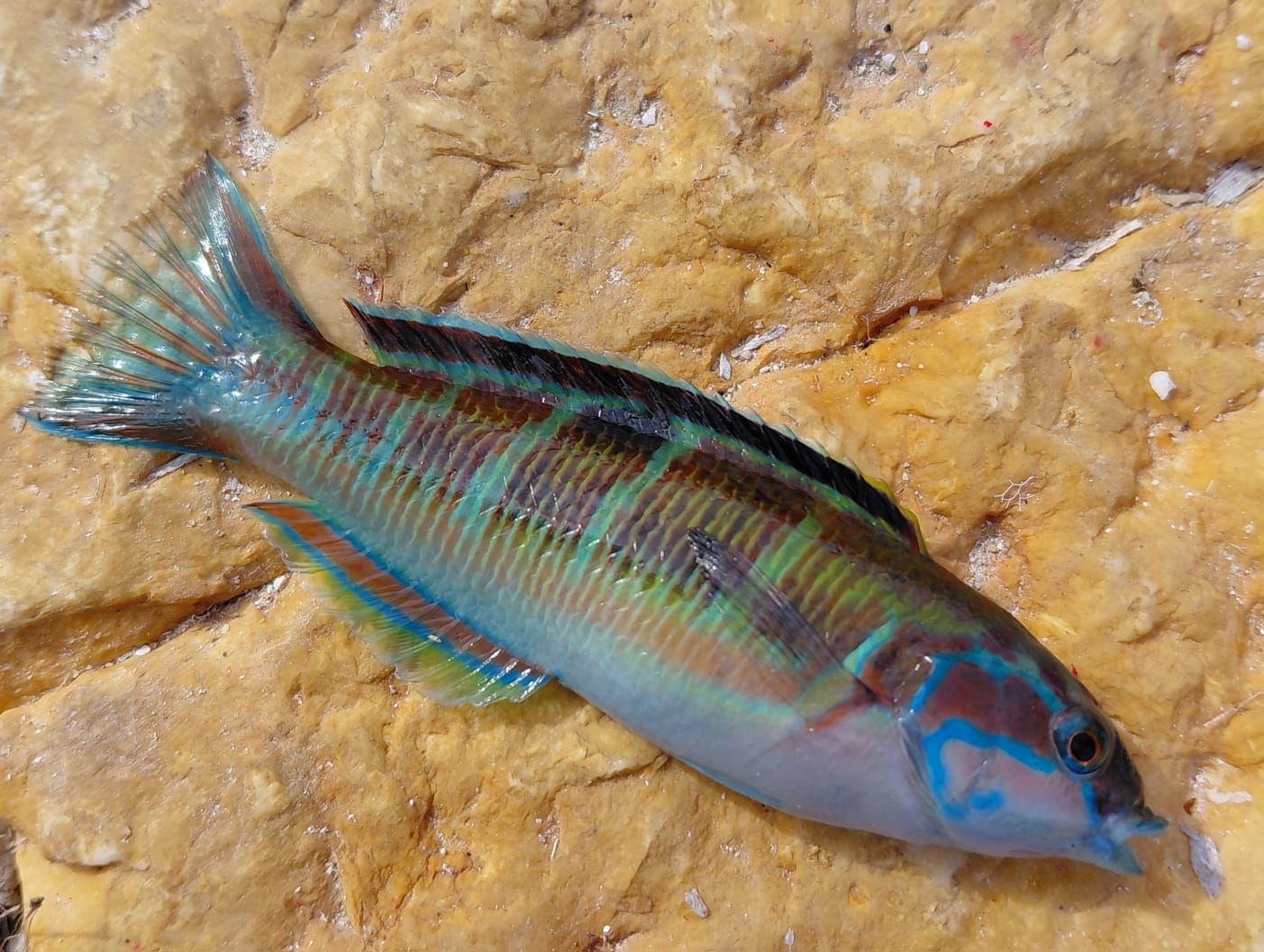
Female, in Italy

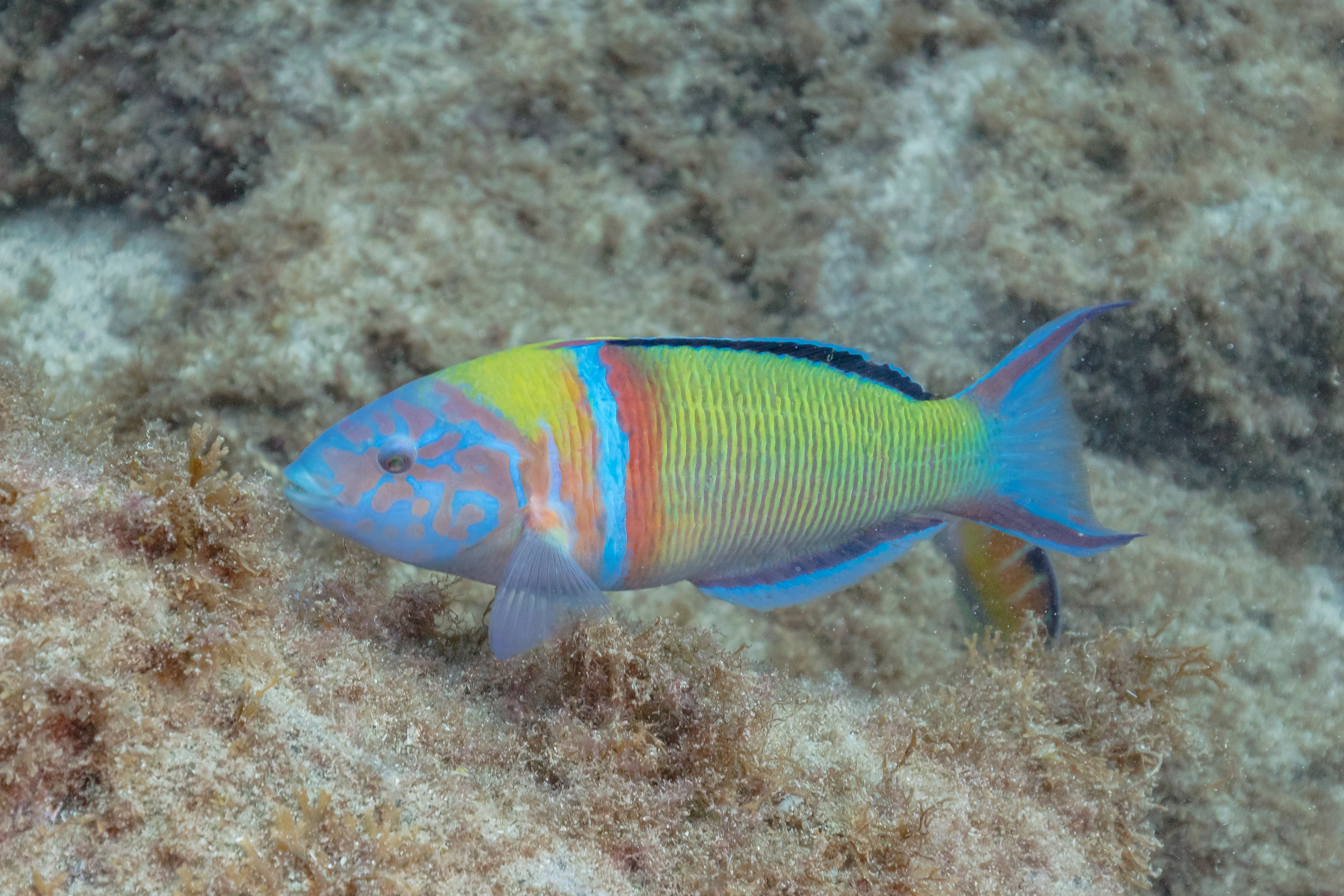
Male, in Spain

== Human usage ==
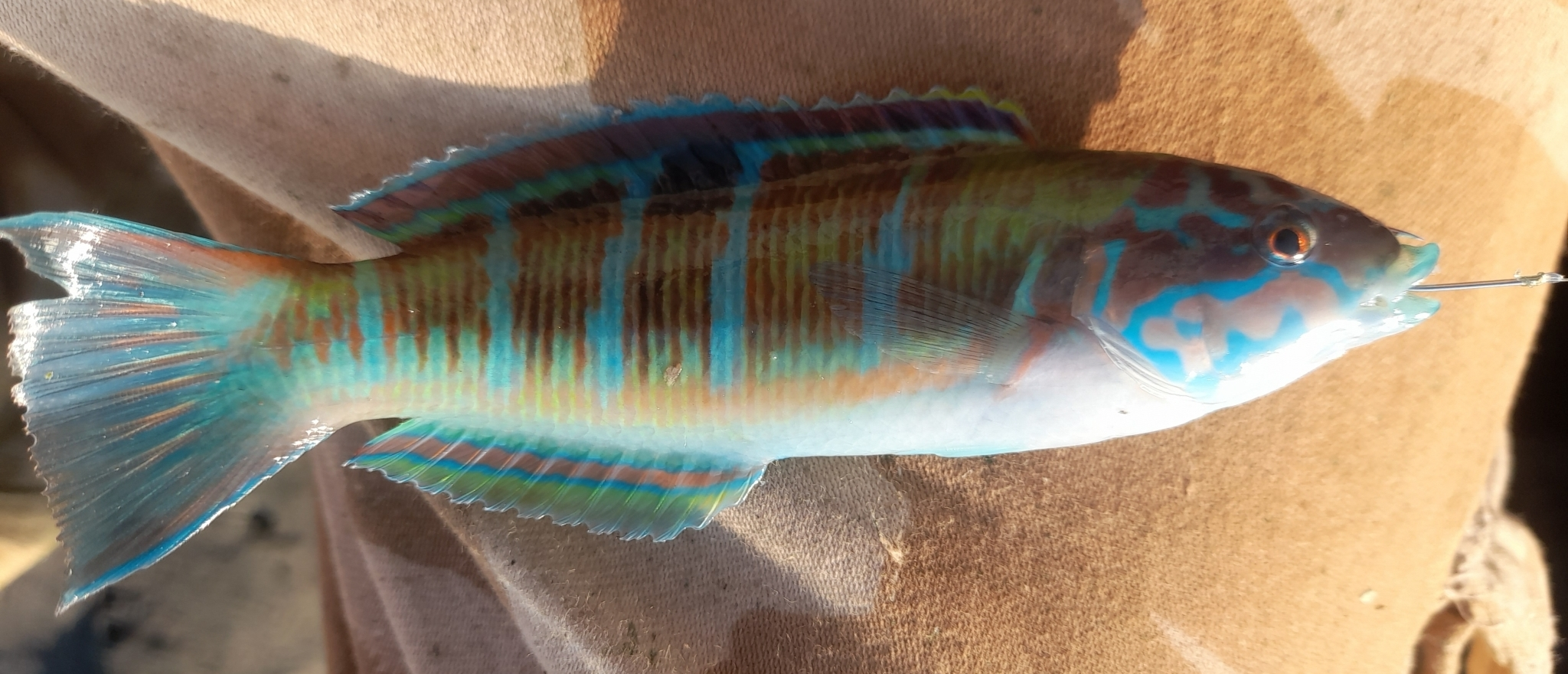
Line-caught female

The ornate wrasse is a quarry species for local fisheries in the eastern Mediterranean and in the Macaronesian archipelagoes, it is fished for using both hook and line and traps. It is also found in the aquarium trade.
