= Harriet (1810 ship) =

US and British ship (1810–1832)

History

United States
- Name: Harriet
- Builder: New York
- Launched: 1810
- Captured: c.1813

United Kingdom
- Name: Harriet
- Owner: 1813
- Acquired: 1 May 1813 by purchase
- Fate: Wrecked late 1831 or early 1832.

General characteristics
- Tons burthen: 2001/94, or 201, or 204 (bm)

Harriet was launched at New York in 1810. She was captured and sold as a prize in 1813 to British owners. She was wrecked at Fanning's Island in late 1831 or early 1832.

== Career ==
Harriet first appeared in Lloyd's Register (LR) in 1818 with S.Skelling, master and owner, and trade London–Demerara.

On 23 May Harriet, Skelling, master, arrived at Barbados from London. On 23 July Harriet, Skilling, master, was off Dover, having come from Barbados; Skellin arrived at Gravesend that same day. In October Harriet sailed for Demerara.

Year	Master	Owner	Trade	Source & notes
1820	S.Skelling	Capt. & Co.	London–Demerara	LR; good repair 1818
1825	Fulcher	Gilmore & Co.	London–South America	LR; large repair 1824
1830	Buckle	Kenners & Co.	London–New South Wales	LR; almost rebuilt 1824 & large repair 1826

Incident: On 3 November 1825 there was a report from Margate that Harriet, Fulcher, master, had come from Singapore. While in the Downs she was driven from there, losing her anchors and cables. She then went to Broadstairs to supply.

LR and the RS for 1832 showed Harriet, W.Buckle, master, Kenner (or Kenniers), owner, and trade London–New South Wales.

== Fate ==
The New Zealand Herald carried a report on 19 July 1832 dated Otaheite 10 April. The commander of HMS Zebra reported having seen Captain Buckle at Otaheite, Harriet having been lost at Fanning's Island. On 10 September Lloyd's List reported that Harriet, Buckle, master, had wrecked at "Fenning's Island". On 20 September the Nautical Magazine and Naval Chronicle of London reported that the British whaler Harriet, Buckle, master, had been wrecked at "Tanning's Island"; her crew had survived.

In 1834 Harriet's register was cancelled as she had been lost at sea.
