= Tabontebike =

Tabontebike is a traditional style of maneaba in Kiribati. It is also the name of several villages including:

- Tabontebike, Abaiang
- Tabontebike, Abemama
- Tabontebike, Kuria
