= Ocean Island Defence Force =

The Ocean Island Defence Force was a British-led colonial military volunteer detachment of the Gilbert and Ellice Islands formed during World War II on Ocean Island (now Banaba Island) in the Central Pacific. It was created to defend the island against an expected Japanese invasion. Following the Attack on Pearl Harbor, the force was converted into an armed, compulsory military unit, with virtually all European residents not providing infrastructure services being conscripted into the force. It operated in tandem with the Australian Army's Ocean Island Force, drawn from B Company, 31st/51st Battalion. In 1942, much of the force was reconstituted into the broader Gilbert and Ellice Islands Defence Force.

== See also ==
- Gilbert and Ellice Islands
- Gilbert Islands campaign
- Ocean Island massacre
- Structure of the British Army in 1939
- Japanese occupation of the Gilbert Islands
