= Japanese occupation of the Gilbert Islands =

Part of World War II

Gilbert Islands ギルバート諸島 Girubāto-shotō
- 1941–1943
- Flag Imperial Seal
- Status: Military occupation by the Empire of Japan
- Common languages: Japanese; Gilbertese
- Historical era: World War II
  - Occupation of Makin: 9 December 1941
  - American troops land on Tarawa: 20 November 1943
  - Occupation of Ocean Island ends: 21 August 1945
Preceded by	Succeeded by
Gilbert and Ellice Islands	Gilbert and Ellice Islands
- Today part of: Kiribati

The Japanese occupation of the Gilbert Islands was the period in the history of Kiribati between 1941 and 1945 when Imperial Japanese forces occupied the Gilbert Islands during World War II, in the Pacific War theatre.

From 1941 to 1943, Imperial Japanese Navy forces occupied the islands, and from 1942 until 1945 Ocean Island which was home to the headquarters of the Gilbert and Ellice Islands colony (GEIC).

== Preparations ==
On 29 November 1941, Operation Gi (for Gilbert Islands) was decided within the Japanese 4th Fleet and departed from Truk, headquarters of the South Seas Mandate. The flagship was the minelayer Okinoshima, and the operation included the minelayers Tsugaru and Tenyo Maru and cruiser Tokiwa, Nagata Maru, escorted by Asanagi and Yūnagi of the Destroyer Division 29/Section 1. The Chitose Naval Air Group provided air cover. On 2 December 1941, Okinoshima received the signal "Climb Mt. Niitaka 1208", signifying that hostilities would start on 8 December. Okinoshima arrived at Jaluit and embarked a SNLF, from 51st Guards Force. She departed from Jaluit on 6 December and joined Asanagi and Yūnagi on 8 December.

== Northern Gilbert Islands ==
The Japanese occupation of the Northern Gilbert Islands can be divided into three periods:

- from 10 December 1941 to 16 August 1942, 71 armed personnel of the Imperial Japanese Navy garrisoned the seaplane base on Butaritari (then called Makin) up to the time of the raid by the Marines on 17–18 August 1942;
- from 20 August 1942 to March 1943, with a gradual increase of the expansion towards the south, including Tarawa and Abemama, and also Nauru outside of the Gilberts, to become fortified places with airfields;
- the last phase, before the end of occupation, from March to the end of battle of Tarawa and battle of Makin on 23 November 1943.

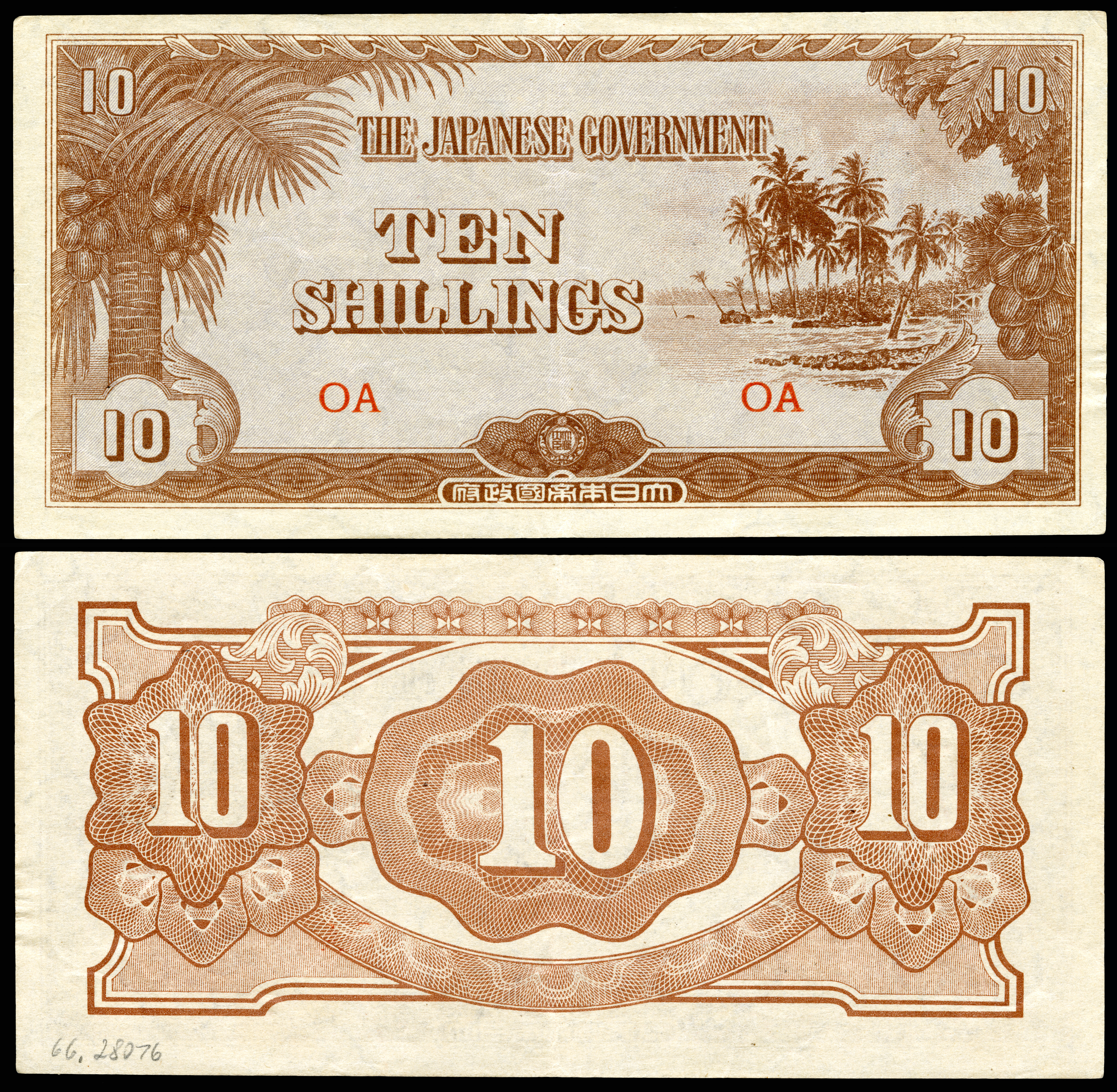
10 shillings of the Japanese occupation currency, 1942

On the day of their attack on Pearl Harbor, Japanese military forces embarked on board the minelayer Okinoshima which was serving as flagship for Admiral Kiyohide Shima in Operation Gi (the invasion of the Gilbert Islands) and had deployed from Jaluit with a Special Naval Landing Force (SNLF). From 9–10 December, Okinoshima supported the Japanese landings on Makin and on Tarawa, and on 24 December, the seizure of Abaiang. The 51st Guards Force from Jaluit occupied on 10 December 1941 (local time 0045), Makin and on 11 December Little Makin, then later Abaiang and Marakei in the northern Gilbert Islands. Japanese immediately seized the New Zealand Coastwatchers of Makin. Within two days, a seaplane base was built on Makin lagoon by Nagata Maru.

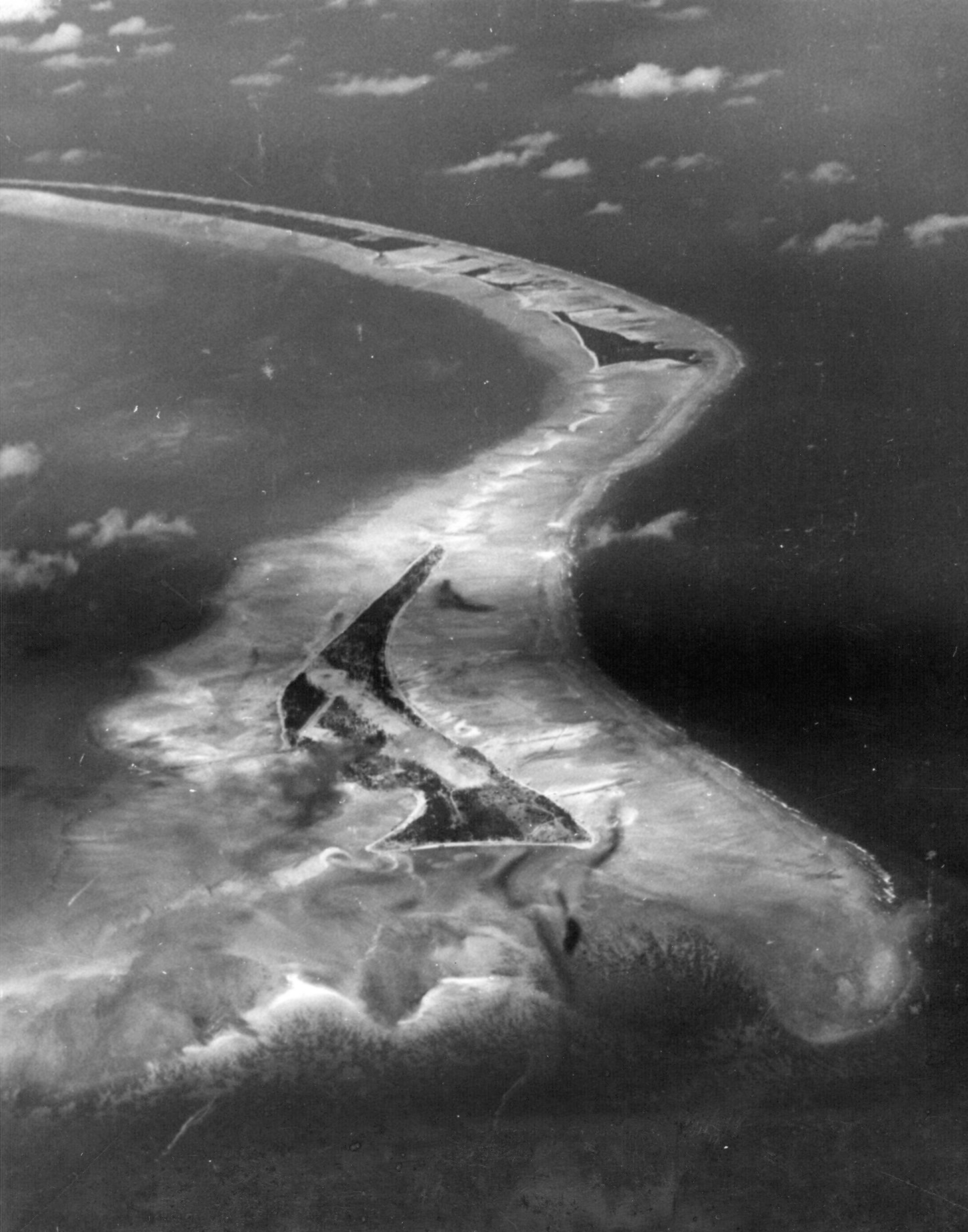
Betio aerial view in September 1943

A few hours before the Makin occupation, on 10 December 1941, the same Japanese landing military (DesDiv 29/Section 1's Asanagi and Yūnagi) also visited Tarawa, where they rounded up the Europeans and informed them that they could not leave the atoll without the permission of the naval commander, Kiyohide Shima. The Japanese destroyed all means of transportation and ransacked the Burns Philp trading station, then departed for Makin.

The Imperial Japanese Navy forces on Makin were part of the Marshall Islands Garrison, and officially titled the 62nd Garrison Force. At the time of the Makin raid on 17–18 August 1942 the total force opposing the American landing consisted of 71 armed personnel of the Japanese seaplane base led by Warrant Officer (Heisouchou) Kyuzaburo Kanemitsu of the Special Naval Landing Force equipped with light weapons. In addition there were also four members of the seaplane tender base and three members of a meteorological unit. Two civilian personnel were attached to the Japanese forces as interpreters and civilian administrators.

On 31 August 1942, Japanese troops also occupied Abemama. On September, some remote central and southern islands were also briefly visited or occupied (Tamana was the southernmost) especially in order to destroy the Coastwatchers network, headquartered on Beru. On 15 September 1942, Japanese forces occupied Tarawa and began fortifying the atoll, mainly Betio islet where they built Hawkins Field, an airfield.

In response, on 2 October 1942, US forces occupied the Ellice Islands and began constructing airfields on Funafuti, Nukufetau and Nanumea as a base of operations against the Japanese occupation in the Gilbert and Marshall Islands.

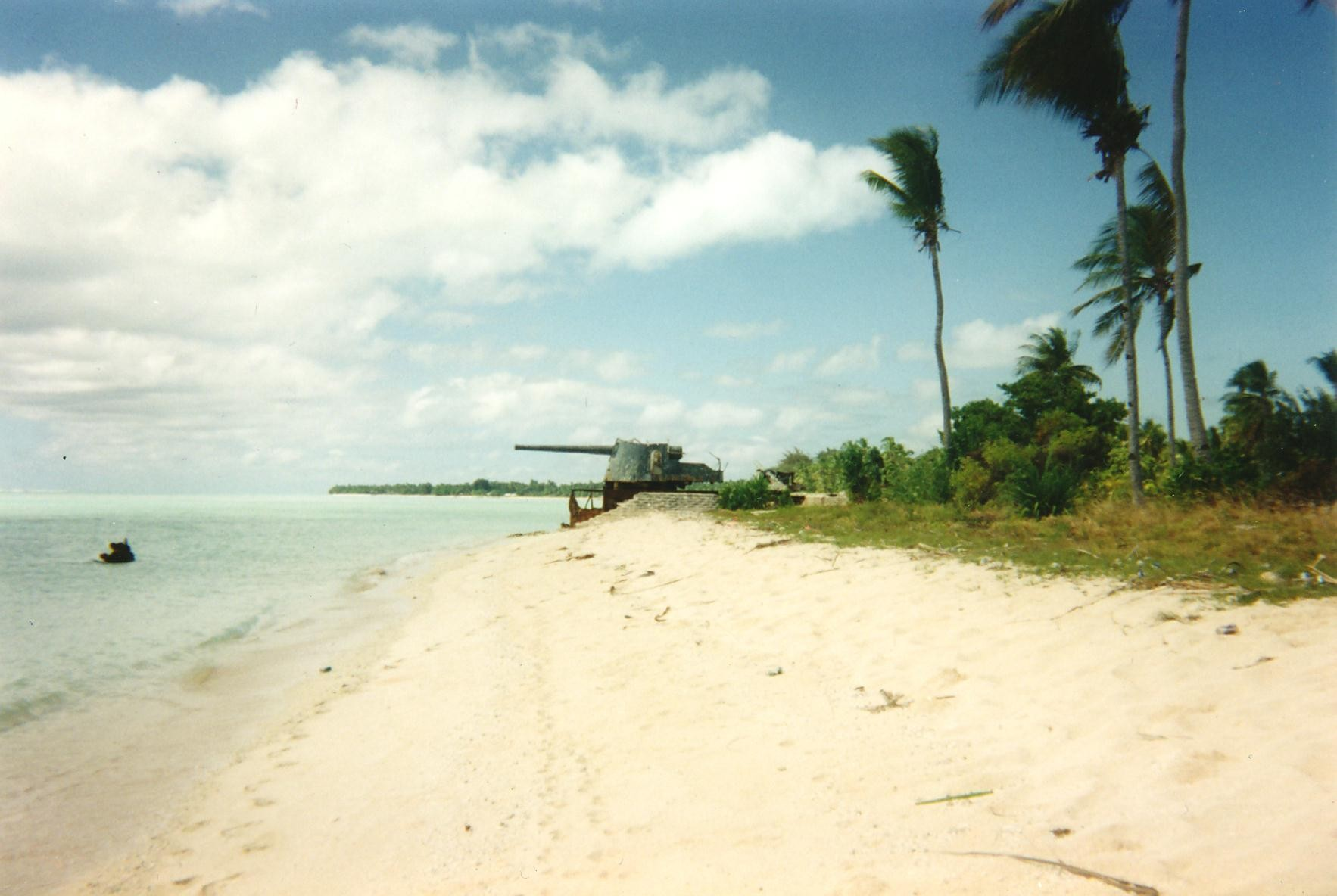
Japanese defense in Betio

The first offensive operation from the new American airfield at Funafuti was launched on 20 April 1943 when 22 B-24 Liberator aircraft from 371 and 372 Bombardment Squadrons bombed Nauru. The next day the Japanese made a predawn raid on the strip at Funafuti that destroyed one B-24 and caused damage to five other planes. On 22 April, 12 B-24 aircraft bombed Tarawa.

On 6 November 1943, the United States Seventh Air Force established its forward headquarters base on Funafuti, to prepare the battle of Tarawa.

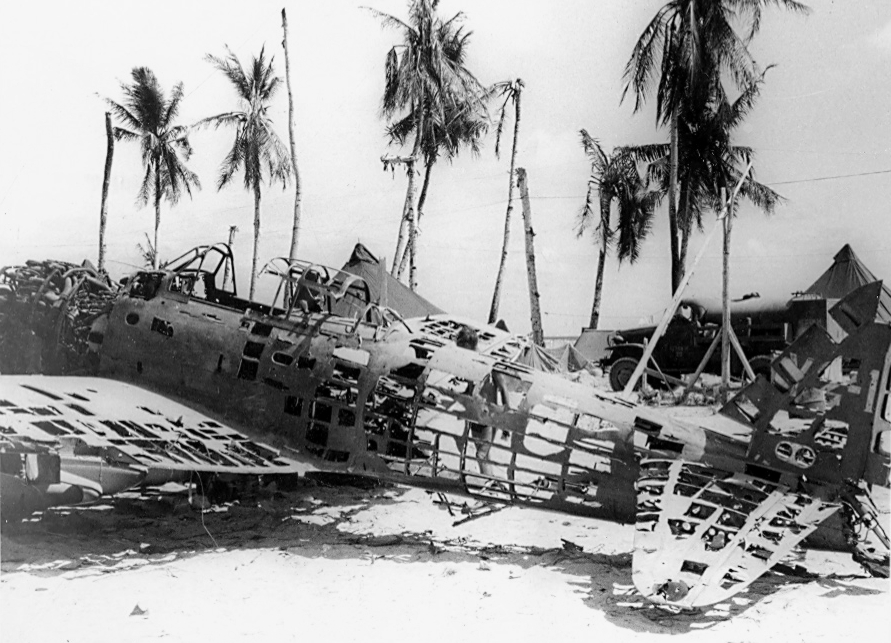
A6M Zero Japanese plane wrecked in Tarawa

Rear Admiral Keiji Shibazaki was killed on 20 November 1943, as the last commander of the Japanese 3rd Special Base Force — in garrison on the island of Betio — and of the Gilbert Islands, Nauru and Ocean Island. Admiral Carl Henry Jones (1893–1958) became thereafter the U.S. commander of the Gilbert Islands subarea (from 18 Dec 1943 to 1 Oct 1944), at the end of this battle.

== Ocean Island ==
In July 1941, Australia and New Zealand evacuated dependents of British Phosphate Commission employees from Ocean Island.

On 8 December 1941, a Japanese flying boat Kawanishi H6K dropped six bombs on the Government Headquarters on Ocean Island. In February 1942, the Free French destroyer Le Triomphant evacuated the remaining Europeans and Chinese from Ocean Island. Japanese forces occupied the island from 26 August 1942. Cyril Cartwright, was acting Resident Commissioner of the Gilbert and Ellice Islands Colony on Ocean Island from December 1941 to August 1942. While he had the opportunity to leave Ocean Island when the personnel of the British Phosphate Commission were evacuated, he choose to stay to safeguard the people who remained on the island. He was subjected to ill-treatment and malnutrition and died on 23 April 1943. All but about 143–160 Banabans were deported to Nauru, Tarawa, Truk or Kosrae, until the end of the Pacific War in 1945. On 20 August 1945, five days after the surrender of Japan, the Japanese troops massacred the 150 Banabans remaining on Ocean Island. Only one person, Kabunare Koura, survived the massacre. He was the chief prosecution witness in the trial of 23 of Japanese soldiers and officers charged with committing the massacre. Twenty-one of them were found guilty, with 8 of them being executed. On 21 August, Australian troops retook Ocean Island from the Japanese. Before the end of the year, the 280 Banabans who survived the war on Nauru, Tarawa, Kosrae or Truk were resettled on Rabi Island in Fiji.

== Japanese Commanders ==
- 9 Dec 1941 – 1942, Capt. Shigetoshi Miyazaki (宮崎重敏, IJNAF) (1897–1942), commanded the Gilberts’ Operation in the initial phase
- 1942 – 17 Aug 1942, Warrant Officer Kyuzaburō Kanemitsu (d. 1942), commander on Makin, killed on Raid on Makin Island;
- Sep 1942 – 22 Feb 1943, Cdr. Keisuke Matsuo (松尾景輔) (b. 1890? – d. 1943), commander of the Yokosuka 6th SNLF (No. 6 Base Force, based in Kwajalein), was in command locally of the force on Tarawa;
- 22 Feb 1943 – Jul 1943, Rear Admiral Saichirō Tomonari (友成佐市郎) (b. 1887 – d. 1962), commander in Tarawa, for the Gilbert Islands, Nauru and Ocean Island;

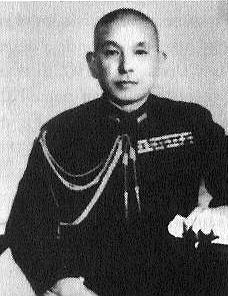
Keiji Shibazaki, the last Japanese commander

- Sep 1943 – 20 Nov 1943, Rear Admiral Keiji Shibazaki (b. 1894 – d. 1943)
  - Japanese occupation ends on the Gilbert Islands on 23 November 1943.
  - Japanese occupation ends on Ocean Island on 21 August 1945.

Because of the distance between Kwajalein and Tarawa (580 nm), on 15 February 1943, the Gilbert Islands, Ocean Island and Nauru were removed from the 6th Base Force in Kwajalein and replaced under a new 3rd Special Base Force with headquarters in Betio, with Admiral Tomonari replacing Matsuo. Because of the loss of his command, Matsuo performed seppuku on 2 May 1943.

== See also ==
- Pacific Islands home front during World War II.
- Gilbert and Marshall Islands campaign
- Japanese occupation of Nauru
- Raid on Makin Island
- Battle of Tarawa
- Battle of Makin

== Bibliography ==
- Hoyt, Edwin P. (1979). Storm Over the Gilberts: War in the Central Pacific 1943. New York, NY: Van Nostrand Reinhold.
- Moran, Jim (2019). The Gilbert and Ellice Islands — Pacific War. Yorkshire, England: Pen & Sword Military. p. 176. ISBN 978-1-52675-119-5.
- Garrett, Jemima (1996). Island exiles. Sydney: ABC books. p. 200. ISBN 0-7333-0485-0.
- Gill, G. Hermon (1957). Australia in the War of 1939–1945. Series 2 – Navy. Vol. I – Royal Australian Navy, 1939–1942 (1st edition, 1957 ed.). Canberra: Australian War Memorial. Gill57.
- Williams, Maslyn; Macdonald, Barrie (1985). The Phosphateers: A History of the British Phosphate Commissioners and the Christmas Island Phosphate Commission. Melbourne University Press. p. 586. ISBN 0-522-84302-6.
- Tanaka, Yuki (2010). Japanese Atrocities on Nauru during the Pacific War: The murder of Australians, the massacre of lepers and the ethnocide of Nauruans. Japan focus. Archived from the original on 19 March 2015.
- Viviani, Nancy (1970). Nauru, Phosphate and Political Progress. Australian National University Press. ISBN 0-7081-0765-6.

== Sources ==
- Morris, Narrelle (2019). Japanese war crimes in the Pacific: Australia's investigations and prosecutions (PDF). Kingston, ACT: National Archives of Australia. ISBN 978-1-922209-22-1.
- Sissons, David (2020). Tamura, Keiko; Stockwin, Arthur (eds.). Bridging Australia and Japan: Volume 2 the writings of David Sissons, historian and political scientist. Acton, A.C.T.: ANU Press. doi:10.22459/BAJ.2020. ISBN 9781760463762. OCLC 962408104. S2CID 225347954.
