= Keisuke Matsuo =

- 松尾 景輔
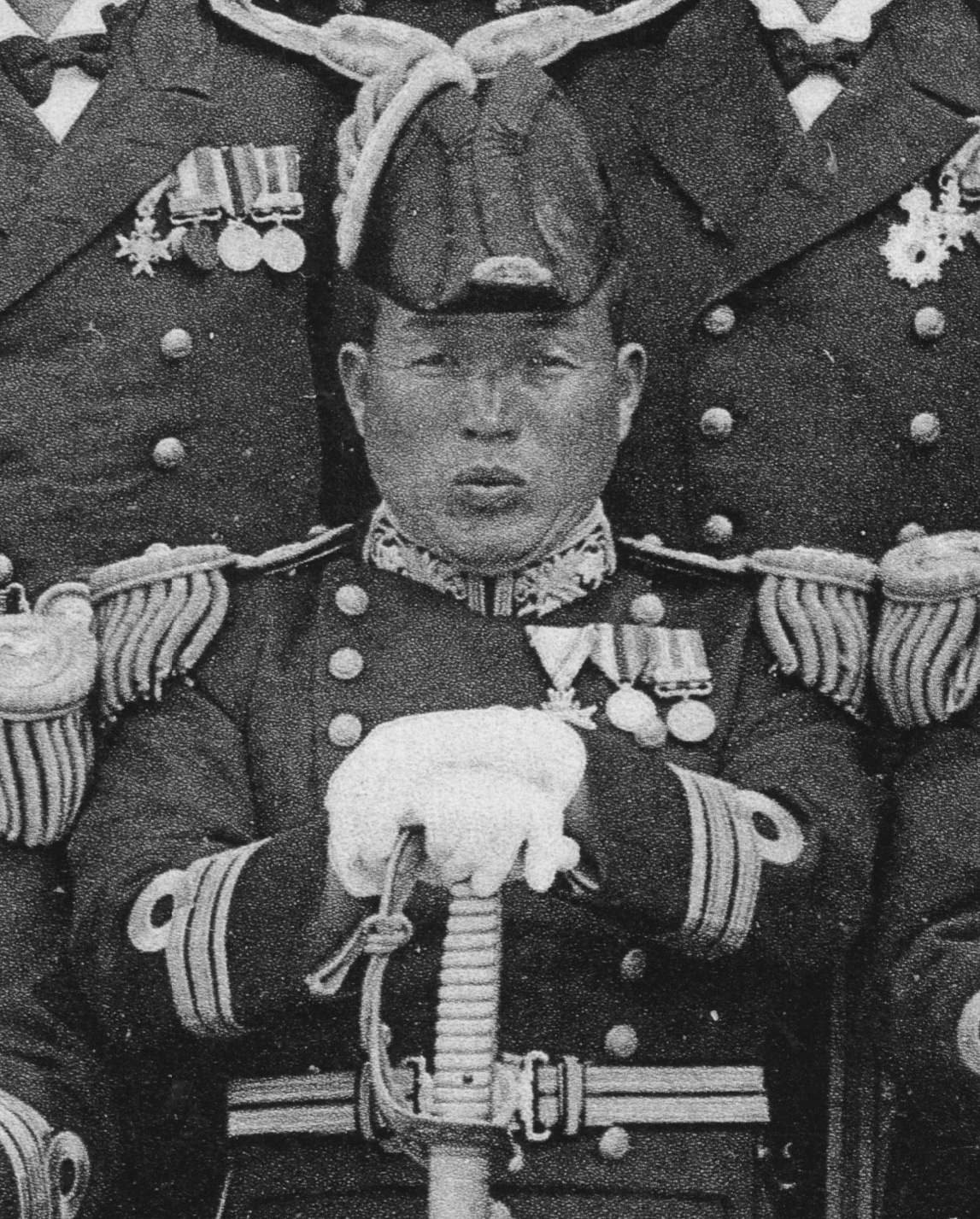
- Born: 1890; Saga, Japan
- Died: 2 May 1943 (aged 52–53); Tarawa, Gilbert Islands
- Education: Imperial Japanese Naval Academy; Naval Gunnery School
- Military career
- Allegiance: Empire of Japan
- Branch: Imperial Japanese Navy
- Service years: 1929–1943
- Rank: Captain
- Units: Hankow Naval Landing Force; Shanghai Special Naval Landing Force; Kure Naval Corps; 3rd Special Base Force
- Commands: Yokosuka 6th SNLF; Gilbert Islands
- Conflicts: Second Sino-Japanese War; World War II

Captain Keisuke Matsuo (松尾 景輔, Matsuo Keisuke; 1890 – 2 May 1943) was a Japanese naval officer noted for his role as commander of the Yokosuka 6th Special Naval Landing Force and senior officer in the Gilbert Islands during World War II

Matsuo joined the Imperial Japanese Naval Academy in 1920 and, after graduating in 1923, served aboard various ships, as well in the Hankow Naval Landing Force, Shanghai Special Naval Landing Force, and as a trainer in the Kure Naval Corps prior to the Pacific War. He specialized in Naval Gunnery and graduated from the 30th Advanced Course at the Naval Gunnery School in 1931.

Matsuo was responsible for the beheading of 21 mainly New Zealand Coast watchers in October 1942.

After being appointed commander of the newly created Yokosuka 6th SNLF on 15 August 1942, Matsuo and his men were sent to the Gilbert Islands following the US Raid on Makin Island. From September 1942 to February 1943 Matsuo would serve as the senior officer on Betio, Tarawa during the Japanese occupation of the Gilbert Islands. Because of the distance between Kwajalein and Tarawa (580 nautical miles), on 15 February 1943, the Gilbert Islands, Ocean Island, and Nauru were removed from the 6th Base Force in Kwajalein with Commander Matsuo's Yokosuka 6th SNLF being reorganized into the newly formed 3rd Special Base Force headquartered on Betio. Admiral Saichirō Tomonari would assume command of the 3rd Special Base Force and Matsuo was assigned as the chief of staff. However, following disagreements with Admiral Tomonari, Matsuo would take his life in the early hours of 2 May 1943 and was posthumously promoted to Captain.
