= Tito v Waddell (No 2) =

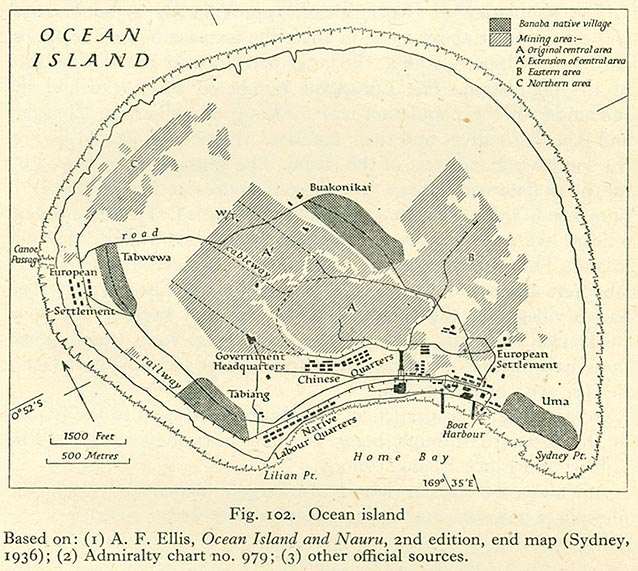
- Court: High Court Chancery Division
- Citation: [1977] Ch 106

Court membership
- Judge sitting: Megarry VC

Keywords
- Trust, fiduciary duties

Tito v Waddell (No 2) [1977] Ch 106 is an English trusts law case, concerning what counts as a trust, and creates fiduciary duties, and when specific performance will be ordered. It is important as an historical case that forced the eviction of the people from the island of Banaba. On the points of specific performance, it has been superseded in the cases of Ruxley Electronics Ltd v Forsyth. It stands as an historical example of an indigenous community exploited and expropriated by the mercantile mining interests of the British Empire.

== Facts ==
In 1900, phosphate was discovered on Banaba (also known as Ocean Island, now part of the Republic of Kiribati, in the western Pacific Ocean). The UK government licensed the Pacific Islands Co Ltd, and from 1902 its subsidiary the Pacific Phosphate Co Ltd, to mine the land. In the 1920s the British Phosphate Commission took over. This was run by the UK, Australian and New Zealand governments, and continued the mining, together with mining on the islands of Nauru and Christmas Island (in the Indian Ocean). From 1907, royalties of 6d. a ton had been paid to the Gilbert and Ellice Islands government. There were difficulties in getting indigenous Banabans to agree to sell the land for the mining. It was apparently "agreed" by the indigenous population in a series of leases that the land would be replanted "wherever possible" "as nearly as possible" to their former state, and that trees, "as shall be prescribed", by the commissioners would be replanted. However, in the mid-1920s the indigenous population refused to sell or lease any more land. The Mining Ordinance 1928 of the Gilbert and Ellice Islands Colony was written to compulsorily purchase it. Any money paid, or any royalties, was said to be held "on trust" by the Commissioner for the former landowners. In 1931, 150 acres of land was acquired, and leased to the Commissioners with royalties held "on trust" for the Banabans, but none for the former landowners. Subsequently, the Mining (Amendment) Ordinance 1937 removed any mention of trust but still said the Commissioner should receive royalties for the benefit of the islanders. Some funds purchased an alternative island, Rabi Island in the Fiji archipelago and the people were relocated. In 1942 the Japanese occupied Ocean Island. They killed most of the remaining Banabans or deported them to other islands and devastated the island. When it was recovered after World War II, the Commissioners acquired the remaining mining lands from the Banabans, who did not know the real value and received no expert advice. In 1948, the islanders agreed to the Commission removing sand and shingle from the beach for an annual payment. They asked for increases in pay, but this was not granted. Representatives of the Banabans later claimed the Crown owed a fiduciary duty to the islanders when fixing the royalty payments and the difference between the actual rate and a proper rate should be paid. Some former landowners further claimed that the Commission was liable for conversion of the sand removed from the island, for specific performance to replant the land, and for a declaration that the government was bound to prescribe the trees be replanted.

== Judgment ==
Sir Robert Megarry held that no fiduciary duties were owed, because the term "trust" in the Mining Ordinance 1927 was not used in the technical sense, but rather in the sense of an unenforceable government obligation. The claim for the beach to be restored, from the 1948 agreement, was now time barred. The replanting obligations under the 1913 agreement were binding, but also, they were limited to what was reasonably practicable. Specific performance would not be decreed because all relevant landowners had not been before the court, and they were limited in a claim for compensatory damages, and these would be nominal because the claimants had failed to prove that their loss resulted from not replanting as opposed to diminution in the value of the land because of non-performance of the covenant.

== See also ==
- English trust law
- Phosphate mining in Banaba and Nauru
