= Taburao =

Coordinates: 1°49′N 173°01′E

- Interactive map of Taburao
- Country: Kiribati
- Islands: Gilbert Islands
- Atoll: Abaiang

Population
  - Total: 322

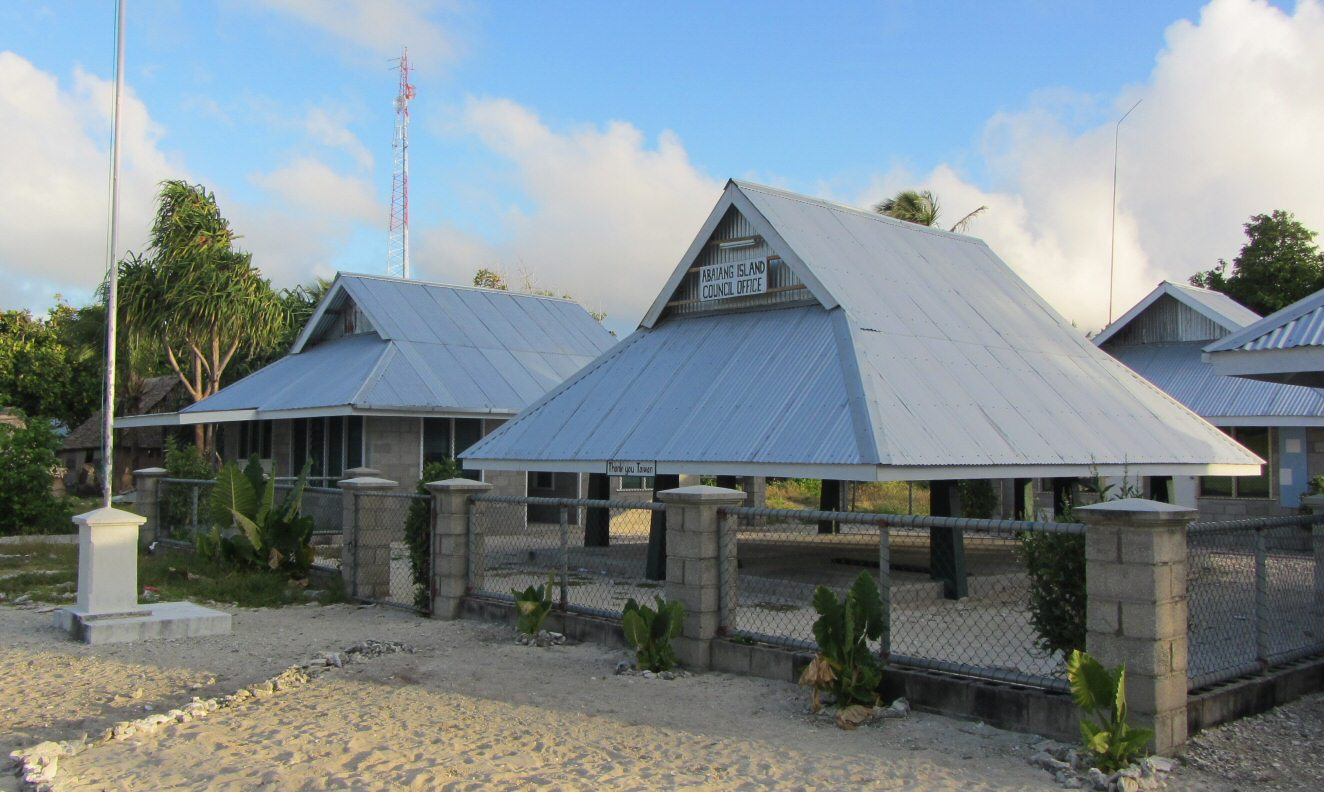
Council Office on Abaiang Island

Taburao is a village on Abaiang, a coral atoll in Kiribati. There are 322 residents of the village (2010 census). The nearest villages are Ewena and Morikao to the north; and Tebero and Taburoa to the south.

The largest health centre on the atoll is located near the Island Council building. A medical assistant is in charge who assisted by a nursing officer and the centre is accessed by people from the villages of Taburao, Tuarabu, Tebero and Ewena.

Apart from small breaks, the whole coastline from Tuarabu to Taburao on the lagoon side is eroding as the result of wave action.
