= Borotiam =

Human settlement in Kiribati

Coordinates: 1°54′N 172°58′E

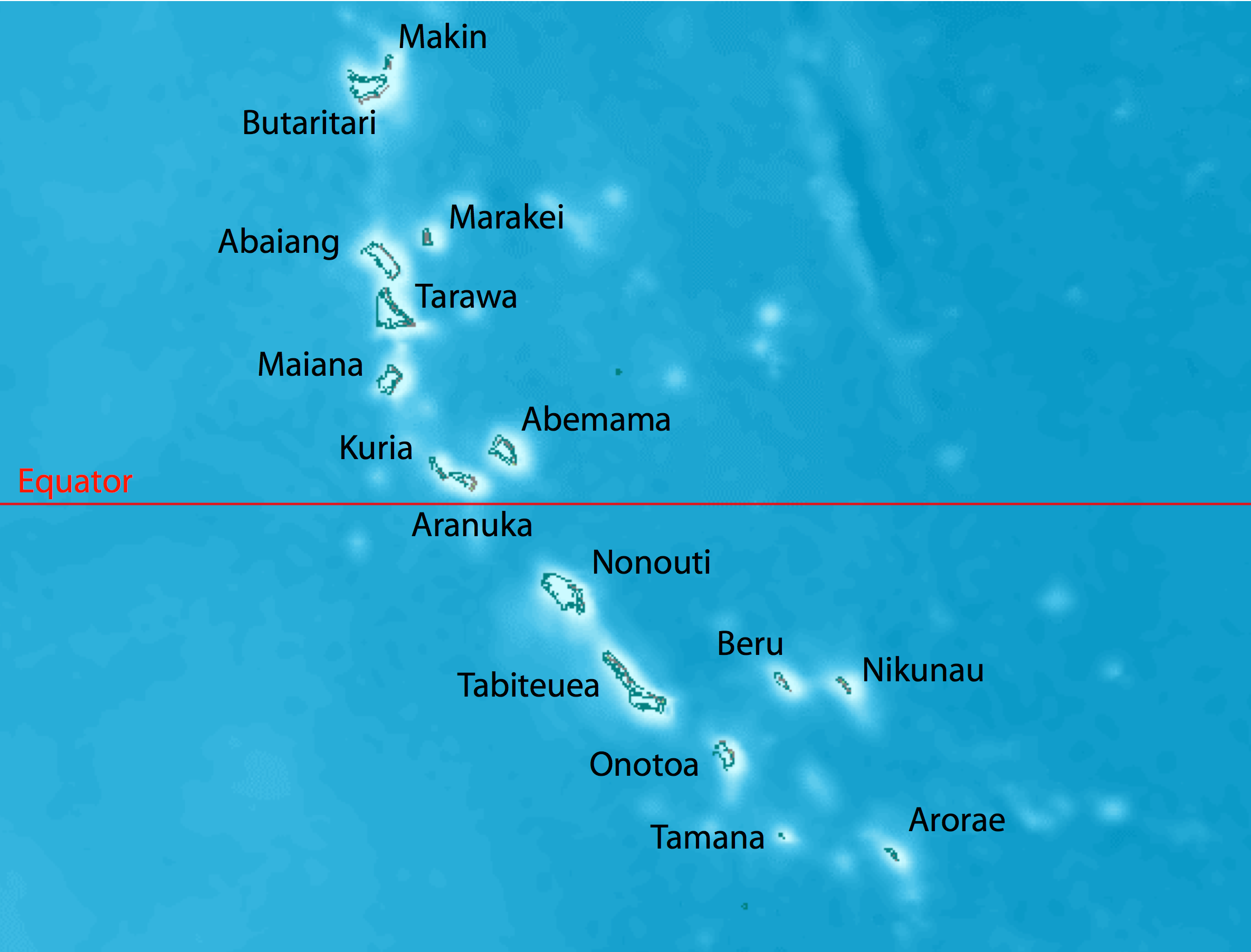
Map showing the Gilbert Islands.

Borotiam is a village on Abaiang, atoll in Kiribati. There are 375 residents of the village (2010 census). The nearest villages, to the north, are Tebunginako and Koinawa. Aonobuaka is to the east.

The village has a medical clinic that is staffed by a Nursing Officer and the clinic is accessed by residents of the Borotiam and Tebunginako community.

The lagoon coastline of Borotiam is being eroded by wave action.

Borotiam (pronounced as "Borosiam") is named after Belgium. Kiribati and Belgium have shared a historical tie which began with a Belgian missionary who arrived in Kiribati over a hundred years ago. He was so loving, devoted and committed to his congregation, that the people were deeply touched and decided to name their village as Belgium.

In the vernacular, this was written as Borotiam, a name which has been kept to this day as a symbol of the everlasting appreciation for the Belgian sacrifice that had contributed significantly to the progress and wellbeing of Kiribati.
