= Tebunginako =

Coordinates: 01.91657°N 172.94588°E

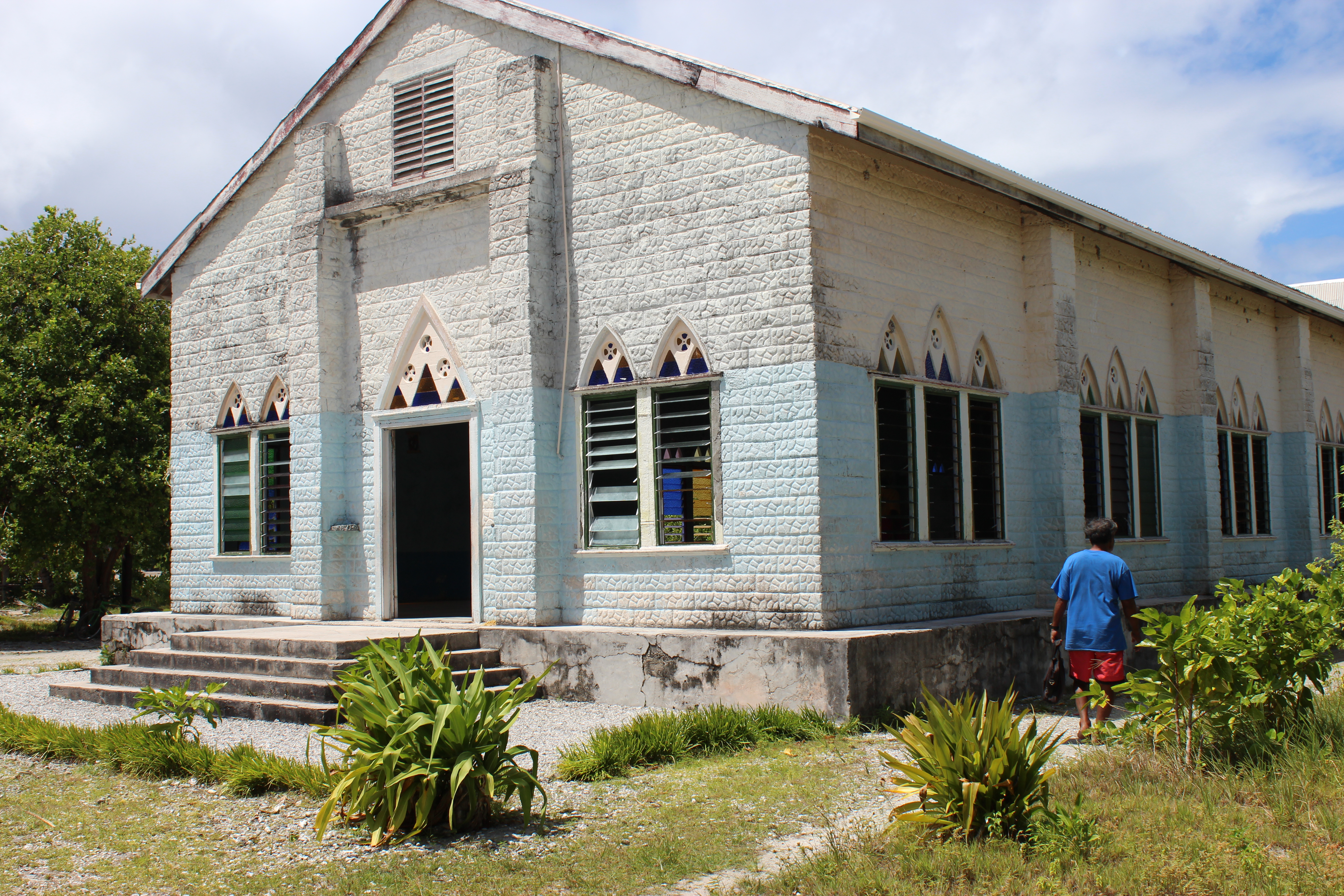
An abandoned building on Tebunginako, used as a combination church and community hall. Saltwater erosion is visible on the building's concrete foundation.

Tebunginako is a village on Abaiang atoll in Kiribati; to its west is Ubanteman, and to its south are Borotiam and Koinawa.

The settlement had been dealing with seawater inundation and coastal instability since the 1970s, and is being abandoned. A report by the South Pacific Applied Geoscience Commission determined that natural erosion was the primary factor, as the village was located close to the site of a blocked ocean/lagoon channel, The Kiribati government has blamed sea level rise caused by global warming.

Erosion was so great that the village had to be abandoned. The remains of about 100 thatched homes and a maneabe (community meeting hall) are now up to 30 metres offshore. The villagers relocated themselves further inland, with the new village retaining the same name. The sea reaches what was the fishpond creating a peninsula with the Roman Catholic church standing on one side of the bay and the village on the other side.
