= Robert Megarry =

British lawyer and judge

The Right Honourable Sir Robert Megarry FBA

Vice-Chancellor
- In office 12 January 1976 – 1 June 1985
- Preceded by: Sir Anthony Plowman
- Succeeded by: Sir Nicolas Browne-Wilkinson

Justice of the High Court
- In office 2 October 1967 – 1 January 1982

Personal details
- Born: 1 June 1910 Croydon, Surrey
- Died: 11 October 2006 (aged 96) London
- Children: 3
- Education: Trinity Hall, Cambridge

Sir Robert Edgar Megarry, PC, FBA (1 June 1910 – 11 October 2006) was an eminent British lawyer and judge. Originally a solicitor, he was requalified as a barrister and also pursued a parallel career as a legal academic. He later became a High Court judge and served as Vice-Chancellor of the Chancery Division from 1976 to 1981. Afterwards he served as Vice-Chancellor of the Supreme Court from 1982 until his retirement in 1985.

A prolific legal writer, he is known for such works as The Law of Real Property, Lectures on the Town and Country Planning Act 1947, and A Manual of the Law of Real Property, as well as a series of legal miscellanies.

== Early life and career ==
Megarry's father was a solicitor in Belfast; his mother's father was a Major General. Megarry was born in Croydon, Surrey and was educated at Lancing and Trinity Hall, Cambridge. He did not concentrate on his academic studies at university, writing for the student newspaper Varsity as its first music critic, playing football and tennis for his college, and obtaining a pilot's licence; he ended up with a third class degree. He married his wife, Iris Davies, in 1936, and they had three daughters. His wife died in 2001, but he was survived by his daughters.

Having trained as a solicitor, he practised as one from 1935 to 1941. He also taught law students, and lectured at Cambridge from 1939 to 1940. He worked at the Ministry of Supply during World War II, rising to Assistant Secretary by 1946. With encouragement from Arthur Lehman Goodhart, Professor of Jurisprudence at Oxford University, he retrained as a barrister, and was called to the bar at Lincoln's Inn in 1944, and left the Civil Service to practise as a barrister in 1946, specialising in equity and land law. In parallel to his legal career, he also taught law at Cambridge University, becoming a fellow at Trinity College, Cambridge in 1945, and rising to become a university Reader by 1967. He was elected as a member of the Bar Council in 1948. He became a Queen's Counsel in 1956, was a bencher at Lincoln's Inn in 1962, and was Treasurer in 1981.

Megarry was also highly regarded as a legal scholar, publishing numerous articles in the Law Quarterly Review, of which he was an assistant editor. He was president of the Society of Public Teachers of Law between 1965 and 1966. In 1970, he was elected a Fellow of the British Academy.

He was prosecuted at the Old Bailey for submitting false income tax returns in 1954. The prosecuting counsel was Sir Harry Hylton-Foster, the Solicitor General and later Speaker of the House of Commons; counsel for the defence was Frederick Lawton, later a senior judge. Megarry's tax affairs were complex, with his earnings as a lecturer dealt with by his wife and his self-employed income from his legal practice dealt with by his clerk. Each assumed that the other was dealing with certain items of income, but in fact neither did, so they were omitted from Megarry's tax returns. The judge directed the jury to acquit Megarry, on the grounds that the error was a genuine mistake with no intention to defraud the tax authorities.

== Judicial career ==
Megarry was appointed as a High Court judge in 1967, assigned to the Chancery Division, and received the customary knighthood. He became Vice-Chancellor of that Division in 1976, effectively its head, as the deputy of the absent Lord Chancellor. He was sworn of the Privy Council in 1978, and held the new post of Vice-Chancellor of the Supreme Court from 1982 to 1985.

He had a traditional view of the law, and was unwilling to set new legal precedent. In Gaiman v National Association for Mental Health, he ruled that the National Association for Mental Health was able to expel 302 suspect members, to prevent a suspected take-over by the Church of Scientology. In Midland Cold Storage v Steer he denounced picketing by dock workers as "the law of the jungle", but held that he had no jurisdiction to ban it, deferring to the National Industrial Relations Court. He was the first Chancery judge to sit outside London, when he attended a mock funeral in Iken in Suffolk to test how easy it would be to carry a coffin along an alleged right of way in St Edmundsbury and Ipswich Diocesan Board of Finance v Clark.

Megarry sat in the case of Tito v Waddell (No 2), brought by the former residents of Banaba Island, Gilbert and Ellice Islands, whose island was all but destroyed by phosphate mining. Sympathetic to the grievances of the Banaban people, he described the 1947 transaction between the Banabans and the British Phosphate Commission as a "major disaster" for the Banabans. He took the court on a 3-week trip to the south Pacific, to visit the island. After sitting for 206 days, he delivered a judgment containing 100,000 words. He asked the Crown to do its duty to the islanders, but found that he was unable to require it to do anything.

He was appointed as vice-chancellor in 1976. In 1977, he declined to grant The Beatles an injunction to prohibit the sale of an unauthorised record based on informal and unrehearsed tapes. In 1979, he upheld a worldwide playing ban imposed on George Best by FIFA arising from a complaint by Best's former employer, Fulham Football Club. Also in 1979, he was unable to uphold a complaint in Malone v Metropolitan Police Commissioner, regarding phone tapping during a police investigation. However, in 1984 the European Court of Human Rights decided that it was a contravention of the European Convention on Human Rights. Megarry ordered Granada Television to disclose the name of a confidential source in 1980, following leaks of information from British Steel Corporation.

He ruled in two cases involving the National Union of Mineworkers in 1984. In the first case, Cowan v Scargill he declined a request from the National Coal Board for a mandatory order to direct union representative how to act as trustees of a pension fund, but gave directions on the representatives' fiduciary duties instead, saying that in his opinion the trustees were obliged to consider investment outside the UK and in industries that compete with coal. He would have said breach of the former would have risked the miners leaders being in contempt of court; breach of the latter would simply enable them to be removed as trustees. In the second case, a month later, he prohibited the NUM from calling a strike in Nottinghamshire, because a ballot had not been held, and then declared that an NUM plan to discipline non-striking miners was illegal.

He was chairman of the Incorporated Council of Law Reporting for 15 years, from 1972 to 1987.

== Legal writings ==
Megarry was also an accomplished legal writer, publishing several leading textbooks. He is perhaps best known as joint author of The Law of Real Property with William Wade, first published in 1957 and usually known as Megarry and Wade. A 6th edition, edited by Charles Harpum, was published in 1999. Megarry also wrote a handbook to the Rent Acts in 1939, which ran to 11 editions by 1988. His Lectures on the Town and Country Planning Act 1947 was published in 1949, shortly after the new town planning legislation was passed, and he also published A Manual of the Law of Real Property (1946), which ran to 8 editions. He was the sole editor of the 23rd edition of Snell's Equity (1947); he then edited the 24th edition (1954) to the 27th edition (1973) jointly with Paul Vivian Baker. His works broke new ground, in presenting technical areas of the law in a clear and systematic way, to the benefit of generations of law students.

His love of the minutiae of legal practice led him to publish several legal miscellanies, including Miscellany-at-law (1955), Arabinesque-at-law (1969), Inns Ancient and Modern (1972), A Second Miscellany-at-Law (1973) and A New Miscellany-At-Law (2005). In 2014, The Green Bag published a "rump" chapter, titled "Contempt," that Megarry had written but not readied for publication before his death, and had entrusted to renowned legal lexicographer Bryan A. Garner to see into print.

He was also a book review and assistant editor of the Law Quarterly Review from 1944 to 1967, and a consultant for the BBC's radio programme Law in Action from 1953 to 1966. He also published An Introduction to Lincoln's Inn in 1971.

== Retirement ==
He retired as a judge in 1985, but occasionally sat until 1991. He was a member of the panel of judges of the Privy Council that decided the important negligence case of Yuen Kun Yeu in 1987. In retirement, he lectured in law in North America, and was Visitor at the University of Essex and in Cambridge.

He was an active member of the Institute of Advanced Legal Studies into the 1990s. His last book, A New Miscellany-at-Law, was published in December 2005.

He died in London.

== Arms ==
Coat of arms of Robert Megarry
Motto Be True

== Notes ==
Legal offices
Preceded by Sir Anthony Plowman	Vice-Chancellor; 1976–1985	Succeeded by Sir Nicolas Browne-Wilkinson
