= Rabi Council of Leaders =

Municipal body responsible for administering Rabi Island

Rabi Island
- Flag

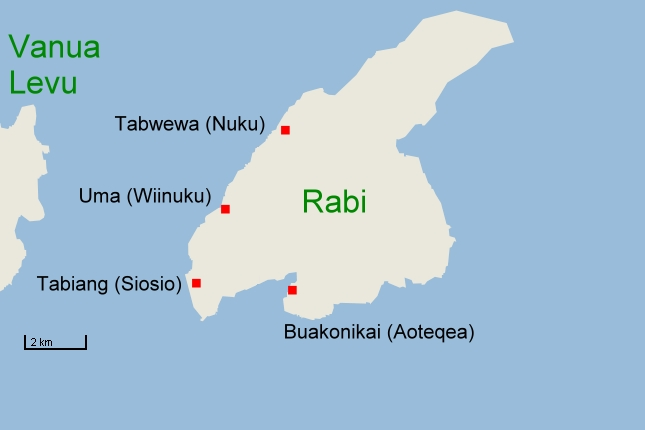
- Rabi Island

- Location in Fiji
- Coordinates: 16°30′S 180°0′W
- Country: Fiji
- Division: Northern Division
- Province: Province of Cakaudrove
- District: Rabi Island

Government * Dissolved in June 2013. From 2023 managed by an Administrator appointed under s. 6(C)(4) of the Banaban Settlement Act 1970, pending elections of members to the Council
  - Type: Local Statutory Governing Body created under the Banaban Settlement Act 1970

Area
  - Total: 67.3 km^{2} (26.0 sq mi)

Population (2014)
  - Total: 5,000
  - Density: 74.3/km^{2} (192/sq mi)
- Time zone: UTC+12 (1200 GMT)

The Rabi Council of Leaders and Elders was the municipal body administering Rabi Island in Fiji. Established by the Banaban Settlement Act 1970, the council was dissolved by Fiji's military regime in June 2013. On 23 January 2023, Fijian Prime Minister Sitiveni Rabuka announced that the council would be reestablished.

== History ==
The 8-member Council had two representatives from each of Rabi's four villages. The Council chose a Chairman, and also selected one of its own members to represent the community in the Kiribati House of Assembly (the Rabi Islanders, though Fijian citizens, still carry Kiribati passports and retain official ownership of Banaba, (their ancestral home, where many current elders of Rabi were born). The Council has its main office in the Fijian capital, Suva.

It was announced in January 2006 that the Rabi Council would be merged with that of Kioa. Misieli Naivalu, the Commissioner for Fiji's Northern Division said on 23 January that Cabinet had decided on 15 January that both islands would benefit from the merger of their councils.

The last election to the council was held in April 2009. It was dissolved by decree of Fiji's military government in June 2013. Following the dissolution, the Fijian government withheld development funding from the island.

In February 2024, the Banaban Human Rights Defenders Network (BHRDN), a community-based organization located on Rabi, call on the Office of the Prime Minister of Fiji to hold elections for the Rabi Council of Leaders. The acting Prime Minister Manoa Kamikamica response was that there was an intention to hold elections; although no timeframe was available from the relevant ministry.

The Banaba Local Government and Civil Society (BLoGSC) Working Group, of Rabi, and other organisations, have also called for an election to reinstate the Rabi Council of Leaders, and for amendments to the Banaban Settlement Act 1970 and Regulations applying to Rabi Island to better serve the Banaban community.

== Appointment of an Administrator of the Rabi Council of Leaders in 2023 ==
In 2023, the government led by prime minister Sitiveni Rabuka appointed a civil servant, Jacob Karutake, as the Administrator of Rabi for a term of 3 years to ensure that the operations and finances of the Rabi Council of Leaders was ready for the next elections. The appointment of Jacob Karutake was made under section 6(C)(4) of the Banaban Settlement Act 1970 that states:

“Upon the dissolution of the Council…the Minister shall appoint an Administrator vested with the powers of the Council to manage the Affairs of the Council until a new Council is elected.”

Decisions of the Administrator have been controversial. In August 2023, the Administrator signed an agreement with an Australian company Centrex to engage in exploration activities on Banaba, as a first step to determine whether the remaining phosphate deposits could be mined. Following opposition of the traditional owners to the grant of permission to explore the feasibility of mining, the Administrator put the agreement “on hold”.

A second controversy arise in January 2024, when the Administrator published a policy statement stating that non-Banabans visiting Rabi must register with local police. The BHRDN objected to the policy and questioned “whether such a regulation is in conflict with the Fiji Constitution”, and said “the administrator's role only continues to exists because the Fiji government has neglected to hold elections for the Rabi Council of Leaders”. The response of the Administrator was that he had consulted with the Rabi Community before publishing the policy statement. Jacob Lanyon, a Fiji lawyer from Rabi, said the administrator’s statement was a long standing policy. The policy also has support from the acting Rabi Council of Leaders, (the formal Rabi Council was dissolved in 2013), who said in a press release issued in February 2024:

“First, it is important to clarify that all non-Banaban visitors are welcomed to Rabi. We pride ourselves with our hospitality and welcome all non-Banabans with good intentions to Rabi Island.
Second, this policy of screening non-Banaban visitors has always been the RCL’s prerogative. Over the years, RCL had and will continue to use this screening process to ensure that only visitors with good-intentions are welcome.”
