= Takarano =

Coordinates: 1°57′N 172°55′E

Takarano is a the most northern village on Abaiang, an atoll in Kiribati. Ubanteman is the village to its south.

There are 348 residents of Takarano (2010 census). The village has a medical clinic that is staffed by a nursing officer, and which serves residents of the Takarano and Ubwanteman communities.

At the northern point of Takarano, extreme erosion has been experienced on both the ocean side of the tip of the island and on the lagoon side; the coast has eroded and accreted over the years.
