= Morikao =

Coordinates: 1°51′N 173°00′E

Morikao is a village on Abaiang, atoll in Kiribati. There are 233 residents of the village (2010 census). The nearest villages are Koinawa and Aonobuaka to the north and Taburao is to the south.

Stephen Whitmee High School is in Morikao.
