= Anthony Plowman =

British barrister and judge

Sir Anthony Plowman
- Plowman in 1970 by Godfrey Argent

Vice-Chancellor
- In office 1 October 1974 – 10 January 1976
- Preceded by: Sir John Pennycuick
- Succeeded by: Sir Robert Megarry

Justice of the High Court
- In office 10 January 1961 – 10 January 1976

Personal details
- Children: 3
- Education: Gonville and Caius College, Cambridge

Sir John Anthony Plowman (27 December 1905 – 30 August 1993) was a British barrister and judge who served as Vice-Chancellor between 1974 and 1976.

== Biography ==
The son of John Tharp Plowman, a solicitor, Plowman was educated at the Highgate School before taking the Law Society examinations, with a view of becoming a solicitor. He then attended Gonville and Caius College, Cambridge, graduating with a First. He was called to the bar by Lincoln's Inn in 1931 and practised at the Chancery bar. During World War II, he joined the Royal Air Force, attaining the rank of Squadron leader.

After the War, Plowman returned to the bar, and was made a Queen's Counsel in 1954. He was appointed to the High Court in 1961 and assigned to the Chancery Division, receiving the customary knighthood. He became Vice-Chancellor in 1974, serving until his retirement in 1976.

Plowman was a member of the General Council of the Bar between 1956 and 1960 and was elected a bencher of Lincoln's Inn shortly before his appointment to the bench in 1961. He married Vernon Graham in 1933; they had three daughters. Lady Plowman died in 1988.

== Arms ==
Coat of arms of Anthony Plowman
Motto Arator Non Orator

Legal offices
Preceded by Sir John Pennycuick	Vice-Chancellor; 1974–1976	Succeeded by Sir Robert Megarry
