= Stephen Whitmee High School =

School in Kiribati

Coordinates: 1°51′N 173°00′E

Stephen Whitmee High School is a senior high school in Morikao, Abaiang Island, Kiribati. It is affiliated with the Kiribati Uniting Church (formerly the Kiribati Protestant Church).

It opened in 1900. Circa 2012 the Japanese government funded the construction of a new 500 seat cafeteria because the former one was old and had asbestos problems. The Japanese government paid $97,087 U.S. dollars, about $94,583 Australian dollars.

== See also ==
- Education in Kiribati
