= Ubanteman =

Coordinates: 1°56′N 172°56′E

Ubanteman is a village on Abaiang, atoll in Kiribati. There are 126 residents of the village (2010 census). To its north is Takarano, and to its east is Tebunginako.

Ubwanteman presently does not suffer from coastal erosion but further towards Takarano, there is extreme erosion and coconut palms are already standing on the beach and public roads are being damaged.
