= Barbara Dreaver =

New Zealand journalist

Barbara Dreaver ONZM
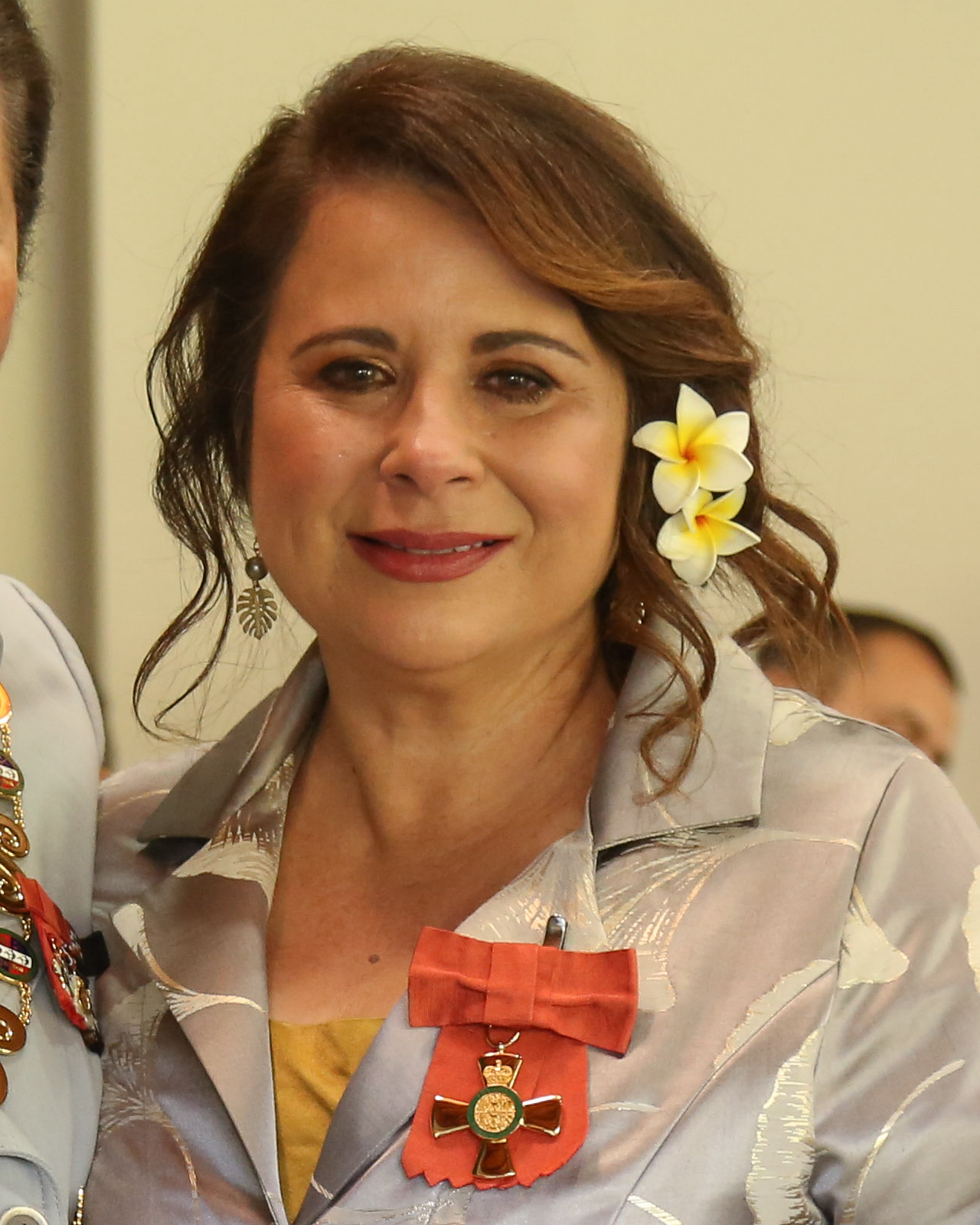
- Dreaver in 2024
- Born: Barbara Helen Dreaver; Banaba, Kiribati
- Education: University of Auckland; Manukau Institute of Technology
- Occupation: Journalist
- Employer: TVNZ

Barbara Helen Dreaver ONZM is a Kiribati-born New Zealand broadcast journalist.

== Biography ==
Dreaver was born on Banaba, a coral atoll in Kiribati. Her mother, Lavinia, was from Banaba and her father, Peter, was a schoolteacher from New Zealand, stationed on the atoll as an adult education officer under the Volunteer Service Abroad scheme. The family moved to the main island of Tarawa when she was young, and when she was 10 years old, moved to New Zealand.

Dreaver studied education at the University of Auckland, graduating with a Bachelor of Arts degree. She then completed a Pacific Island journalism course at Manukau Institute of Technology, but struggled to find work in journalism in New Zealand. In 1990, she moved to Rarotonga and began her career in journalism as a reporter with the Cook Islands News. She later co-owned and edited a weekly newspaper, Cook Islands Press. In 1998, she returned to New Zealand and worked as a business columnist and freelance feature writer for the New Zealand Listener, National Business Review and Radio New Zealand. In 2002, she started working for TVNZ and in 2003 became the network's Pacific correspondent.

In December 2008, Dreaver was detained and deported from Fiji after her reporting offended the regime of dictator Frank Bainimarama. Journalists were subsequently required to seek permission to enter Fiji. The ban was lifted in October 2016.

In September 2018, Dreaver was arrested in Nauru and stripped of her media accreditation for the Pacific Islands Forum meeting after interviewing refugees held at the Nauru Regional Processing Centre.

In 2020, Dreaver created a two-year training programme through the Pacific Cooperation Broadcasting Ltd to support new Pacific journalists across the Pacific region. In 2022, she was appointed a member of the Establishment Board for the Aotearoa New Zealand Public Media body.

Dreaver published her memoir Be Brave in 2026.

== Awards and honours ==
In 2019, Dreaver won two awards at New Zealand's Voyager Media Awards for her coverage of the 2019 Samoa measles outbreak: Best TV/Video News Item and Best Coverage of a Major News Event. In November 2022, she was named Reporter of the Year at the New Zealand Television Awards.

In the 2024 New Year Honours, Dreaver was appointed an Officer of the New Zealand Order of Merit, for services to investigative journalism and Pacific communities.
