= Ocean Island Railway =

Coordinates: 0.86621°S 169.53807°E

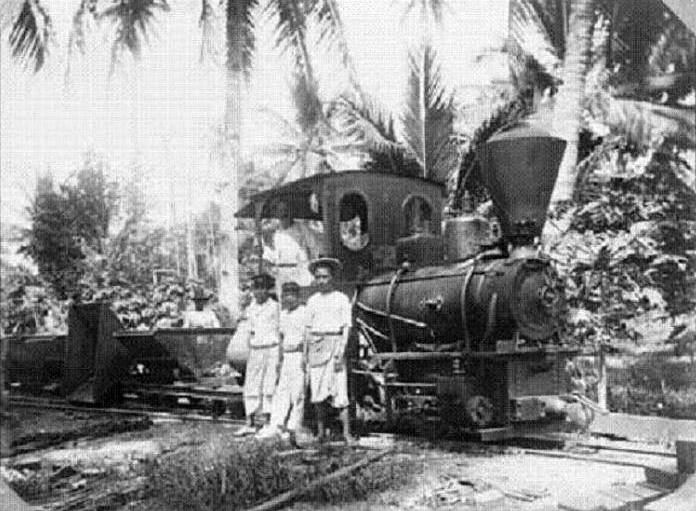
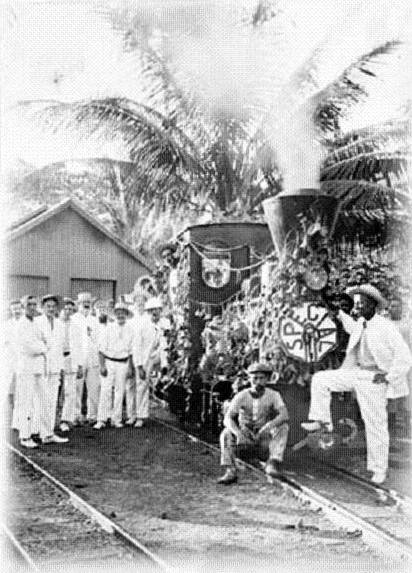
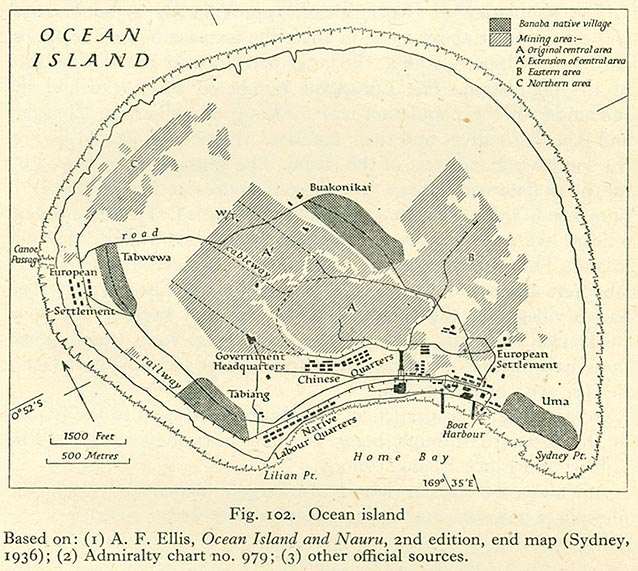
- The first Orenstein & Koppel locomotive, 1906 Special train for Irish dinner guests Route of track on the south coast

Technical
- Line length: 3 kilometres (1.864 mi)
- Track gauge: 2 ft (610 mm) and 3 ft (914 mm)

The Ocean Island Railway (later Banaba Island Railway) was a 3-kilometre (2 mi)-long phosphate mining railway on Ocean Island (later renamed Banaba Island). It had an initial gauge of 2 ft (610 mm). After 1937, the gauge was widened to 3 ft (914 mm) .

== Route ==
The track ran along the coast from the northern guano mining areas, through the European Settlement (English:Tabwewa, French: Tapiwa) and the Native Labour Quarters (Tabiang, Tapiang) to the depot and Boat Harbour (Uma, Ooma).

== Operation ==
Initially, steam locomotives manufactured by Orenstein & Koppel (O&K), and a saddle tank locomotive manufactured by Bagnall, were used. One O&K locomotive was named Florence, one had the number 7 (O&K works number 12678 of 1935) and another one the number 11 (O&K works number 9880 of 1922).

Later, diesel locomotives were used. European passengers were transported in a canopy car and native labourers in an open wagon.

== Locomotives ==
Manufacturer	Type	Works No	Year	Gauge	Remarks
Bagnall	0-4-0ST			610 mm	Saddle tank locomotive
O&K	0-4-0T	9880	1922	610mm	No 11
O&K	0-4-0T	11174	1926	610mm	Location unknown, possibly on another island
O&K	0-4-0T	11291	1926	610mm	Location unknown, possibly on another island
O&K	0-4-0T	11585	1928	610mm	
O&K	0-4-0T	11586	1928	610mm	
O&K	0-4-0T	12678	1935	610mm	No 7
O&K	0-4-0T	12887	1937	914mm	
O&K	0-4-0T	12888	1937	914mm	
O&K	B-t	12889	1937	914mm	
O&K	0-4-0T	12890	1937	914mm	
O&K	0-4-0T	12891	1937	914mm	
O&K	0-4-0T	3300	1909	600mm	40 PS, delivered to Marrison, James & Co., Australia for Nauru, from 1920 as No 12 on Ocean Island (Replacement boiler 13108 of 1955)
