= Aonobuaka =

Village on Abaiang atoll of Kiribati

Coordinates: 1°53′N 172°59′E

Aonobuaka is a village on Abaiang, atoll in Kiribati. There are 328 residents of the village (2010 census). It is to the north of Koinawa and Morikao and to the south of Borotiam.
