= Ocean Island massacre =

1945 Japanese massacre of civilians

- Part of the Japanese occupation of the Gilbert Islands
- Location: Banaba, Kiribati
- Date: 20 August 1945 (81 years ago)
- Victim: 150–200
- Perpetrators: 67 Naval Garrison Unit, IJN: Suzuki Naoomi

The Ocean Island massacre occurred on 20 August 1945 when between 150 and 200 civilians were killed in a mass execution by members of a Japanese naval garrison unit. The civilians, all originally inhabitants from other parts of the Gilbert Islands, had been brought to Ocean Island as slave labour. Perpetrated five days after the official Japanese announcement of surrender at the end of the Second World War, the nature of the massacre was only revealed four months later due to the emergence of a sole survivor, Kabunare Koura of Nikunau, who had remained in hiding until December 1945. Initially, the commander of the unit, Suzuki Naoomi, claimed that the civilian population had been killed during a rebellion, but the revelation of Kabunare's testimony and subsequent confessions from lower ranking participants led to war crimes prosecutions by an Australian military court. In total, 21 Imperial Japanese Navy (IJN) personnel were convicted, of whom eight, including Naoomi, were executed, for their roles in the massacre.

== War crimes trials ==
IJN personnel convicted of war crimes on Ocean Island and sentenced to death
Name	Name (Kanji)	Rank	Sentence at trial	Confirmed sentence	Ref.
Miyasaka Denji	宮坂傳治	Lieutenant	Death by hanging	Executed on 13 August 1946	
Nara Yoshio	奈良賀男	Lieutenant	Death by hanging	20 years imprisonment^{‡}	
Ōtomo Torizō	大友酉蔵	Sub-lieutenant	Death by hanging	Executed on 10 August 1946	
Sakamoto Chūjirō	坂本忠次郎	Sub-lieutenant	Death by hanging	Executed on 10 August 1946	
Sakata Jirō	坂田二郎	Lieutenant	Death by hanging	Executed on 15 August 1946	
Sakuma Wataru	佐久間彌	Lieutenant	Death by hanging	Executed on 10 August 1946	
Suzuki Naoomi	鈴木直臣	Lieutenant-commander	Death by hanging	Executed on 7 July 1947*	
Yajima Eiichi	矢嶋榮一	Lieutenant	Death by hanging	Executed on 10 August 1946	
Yamaguchi Nobuaki	山口？(健)章	Lieutenant	Death by hanging	Executed on 12 October 1946	

^{‡} On the recommendation of the Judge Advocate General, death sentence was commuted to a prison term of 20 years.

* Lieutenant-commander Suzuki's execution was delayed due to appearing as a witness in the trial of Major General Akira Hirota.

IJN personnel convicted of war crimes on Ocean Island and sentenced to imprisonment
Name	Name (Kanji)	Rank	Sentence at trial	Confirmed sentence	Ref.
Arai Kakuzō	荒井角蔵	Chief petty officer	7 years imprisonment	7 years imprisonment	
Hanawa Eiji	塙栄次	Sub-lieutenant	20 years imprisonment	20 years imprisonment	
Hiraki Sakae	平木榮	Sub-lieutenant	20 years imprisonment	20 years imprisonment	
Iijima Tadashi	飯島重	Ensign	20 years imprisonment	20 years imprisonment	
Ishii Sadazō	石井定臓	Sub-lieutenant	20 years imprisonment	20 years imprisonment	
Kiyohara Naoyoshi	清原直美	Sub-lieutenant	20 years imprisonment	20 years imprisonment	
Konno Hiroshi	今野浩	Warrant officer	7 years imprisonment	7 years imprisonment	
Shinozawa Yoshiharu	篠澤美春	Ensign	15 years imprisonment	15 years imprisonment	
Sugino Tsuchinosuke	杉野土之助	Ensign	15 years imprisonment	15 years imprisonment	
Tsuchiike Masatarō	土池政太郎	Sub-lieutenant	20 years imprisonment	20 years imprisonment	
Yasuda Harumi	安田春美	Ensign	15 years imprisonment	15 years imprisonment	
Yoshida Itsuo	吉田逸雄	Sub-lieutenant	20 years imprisonment	20 years imprisonment	

IJN personnel acquitted of war crimes on Ocean Island
Name	Name (Kanji)	Rank	Ref.
Ono Kaneichi	小野兼一	Chief petty officer	
Yachi Sumio	谷地澄雄	Ensign	

== See also ==
- Japanese occupation of the Gilbert Islands
- Japanese occupation of Nauru
- Japanese war crimes
