= Tabontebike, Abaiang =

Coordinates: 1°43′N 172°59′E

Tabontebike is the village on the south end of Abaiang, atoll in Kiribati. There are 379 residents of the village (2010 census).

The village has a medical clinic that is staffed by a Nursing Officer.

The beach crest is at risk of being eroded (breached), which will result in the flooding of the backshore areas. The accelerated erosion at this site appears to be direct result of aggregate mining. Accretion to the coastline is occurring at another location near Tabontebike.

The village is on the extreme point of the cape on the Bingham Channel (these straits is between the lagoon of Abaiang and the Pacific), south of the channel.

== Distances ==
(as the crow flies)

- To Tebwanga village: 1 km
- To Marakei atoll: 40 km (over sea)
- To Tarawa atoll: 11 km (over sea)
- To South Tarawa (national capital, on Tarawa): 43 km (over sea)

== Data ==
- Elevation: < 1 m
- Latitude (DMS): 1° 43' N
- Longitude (DMS): 172° 58' 60'' E
- Languages spoken: English language, Gilbertese language
- Time zone: UTC + 12 h
