= Tabontebike, Kuria =

Village in Kiribati

Tabontebike is a village on Kuria, an island of Kiribati. At the 2020 census, it had a population of 60.
