= Tabontebike, Abemama =

Village in Kiribati

Tabontebike is a village on Abemama, an island of Kiribati. At the 2020 census, Tabontebike had a population of 287.
