= Abaiang =

Atoll of Kiribati

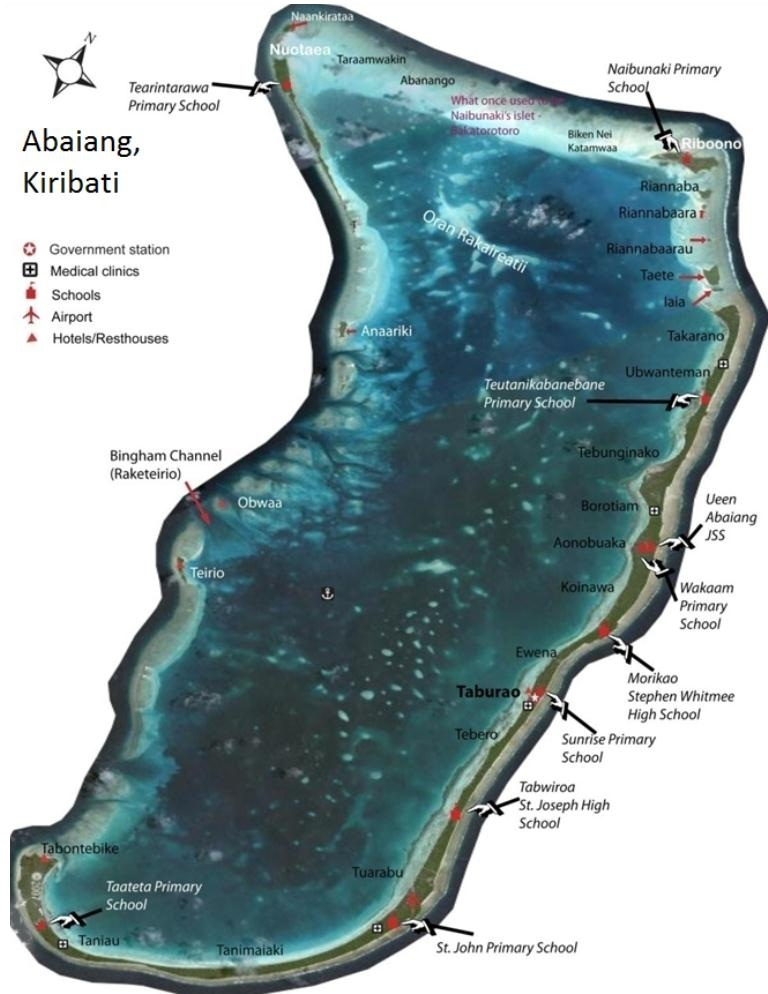
- Map of Abaiang

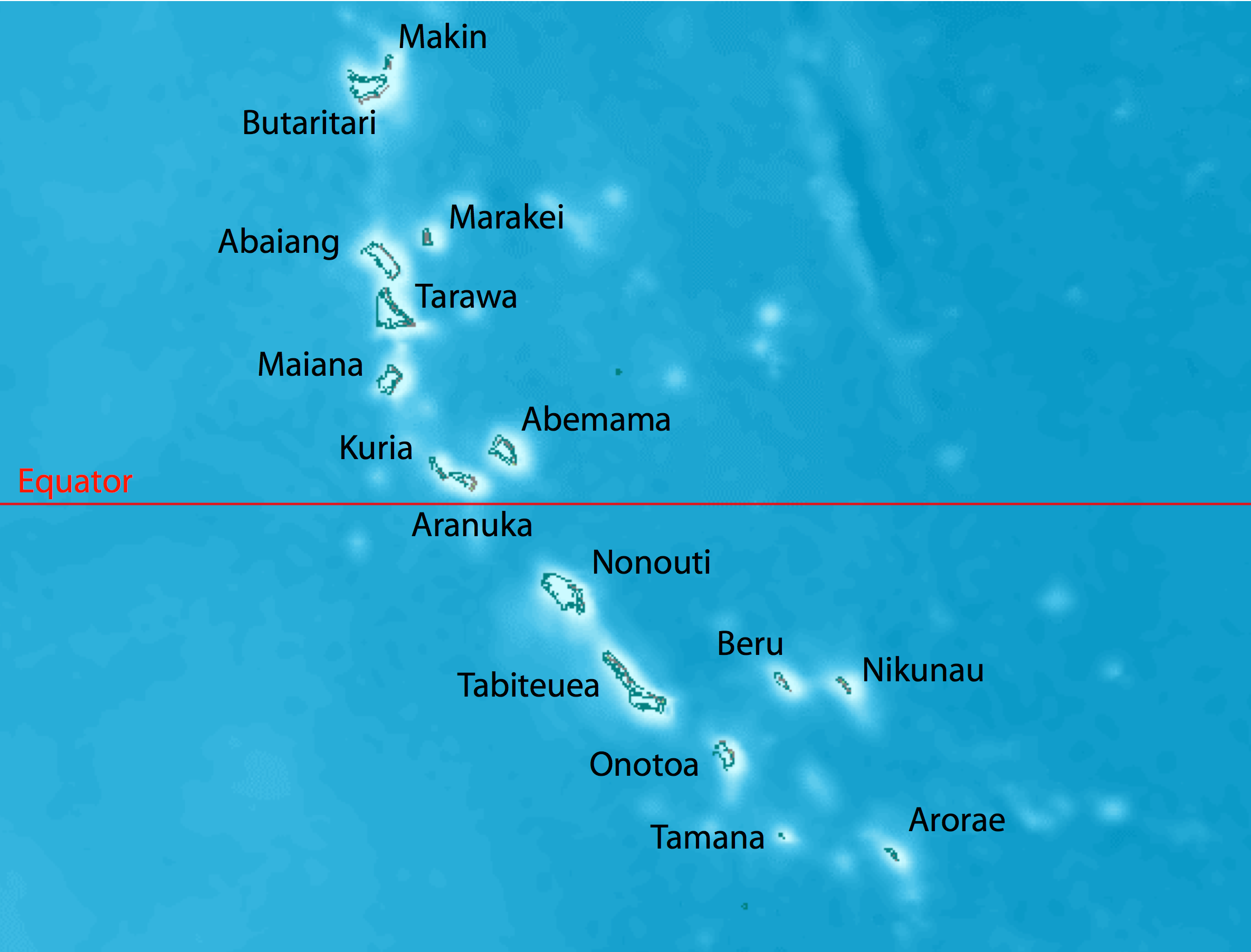

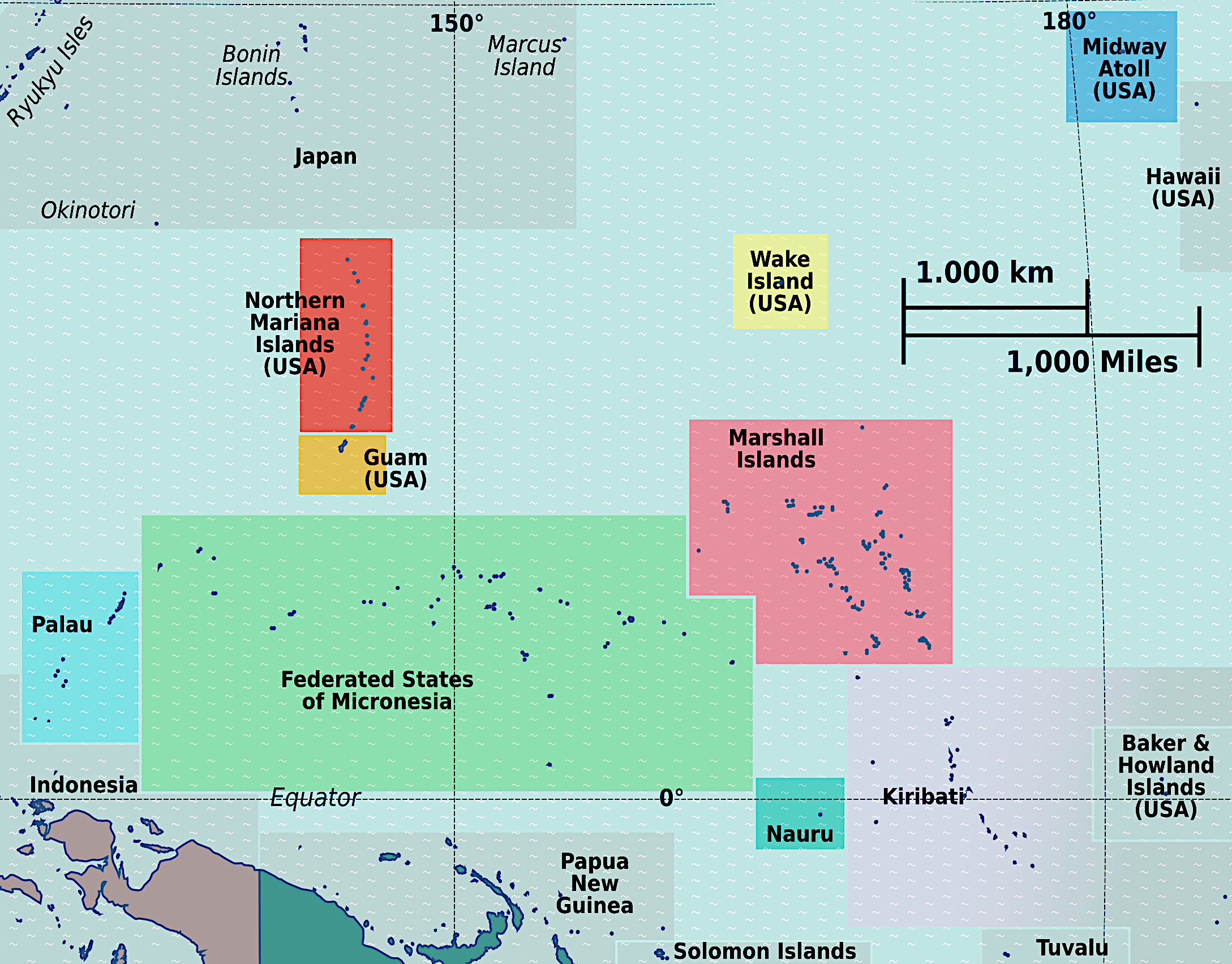
- Location within Kiribati Location within Micronesia Location within Oceania Location within Pacific Ocean

Geography
- Location: Pacific Ocean
- Coordinates: 1°50′N 172°57′E
- Archipelago: Gilbert Islands
- Area: 17.48 km^{2} (6.75 sq mi)
- Highest elevation: 3 m (10 ft)

Administration
- Kiribati
- Largest settlement: Tuarabu, Nuotaea

Demographics
- Population: 5,872 (2020 Census)
- Pop. density: 336/km^{2} (870/sq mi)
- Ethnic groups: I-Kiribati 93.1%

The flag of Abaiang

Abaiang, also known as Apaiang, Apia, and in the past, Charlotte Island, in the Northern Gilbert Islands, is a coral atoll of Kiribati, located in the west-central Pacific Ocean. Abaiang was the island of the first missionary to arrive in the Gilberts, Hiram Bingham II. Abaiang has a population of 5,872 (2020 census).

== Geography ==
Abaiang Atoll is in the northern Gilberts, located not very far to the north of Tarawa. Abaiang is the fourth most northerly in the Gilberts chain of atolls, with a total land area of 4,102.8 acres (16.603 km^{2}). The atoll has a lagoon 16 by 5 miles (25.7 by 8.0 km) that provides sheltered anchorage.

The main island of Abaiang, Teiro (not to be confused with the small islet of Teirio) has a total land area of 3,552.6 acres (14.377 km^{2}) extends from the northern village of Takarano to the southern village of Tabontebike. It occupies the complete eastern rim and also encircles the southern part of the atoll, stretching over a distance of some 23 miles (37 km) Its width ranges from no more than 90 metres (300 feet) to more than 1,000 metres (3,300 feet), averaging 390 metres (1,280 feet). It contains 16 of the 18 villages of the atoll. Two other islets, Riboono 219.3 acres (0.887 km^{2}) and Nuotaea 330.9 acres (1.339 km^{2}) are also inhabited. The remaining islets of Abaiang but Taete, with a land area of 215.5 acres (0.872 km^{2}) are mainly uninhabited, with lack of water and remoteness from the mainland being the main issues. They however are used for fishing, copra cutting and campsites. The islets of Ouba and Teirio have had small motels built on them, with staff travelling from the mainland of Abaiang and from Tarawa when guests are expected.

In the southwest of Abaiang there is a channel, the Bingham Channel, which is the basic conjunction between the lagoon and the Pacific. The channel is between the biggest island of Abaiang (in the east) and a very little island in the southwest of Abaiang called Teirio.

== Effects of climate change ==
Global warming has created a problem for Abaiang and Kiribati, among other island groups. Houses in Tebunginako village have been abandoned. As storm surges becoming more frequent and spring tides more forceful, eventually the erosion was so great that the village had to be abandoned. The remains of about 100 thatched homes and a maneabe (community meeting hall) are now up to 30 metres (98 feet) offshore. The villagers relocated themselves further inland, with the new village retaining the same name.

== Villages ==
In the 2010 Census the total population of 5,502 was spread among 18 villages, with the largest villages being Nuotaea (559 inhabitants) and Tuarabu (560 inhabitants).

Abaiang: Population and Land Area
Census Area	Population 2010	Land area by islet	Density (people per acre)
Nuotaea	559	330.9 acres (133.9 ha)	1.7
Ribono	341	219.3 acres (88.7 ha)	1.6
Takarano	348	3,552.6 acres (1,437.7 ha)	1.2
Ubanteman	126	3,552.6 acres (1,437.7 ha)	1.2
Tebunginako	424	3,552.6 acres (1,437.7 ha)	1.2
Borotiam	375	3,552.6 acres (1,437.7 ha)	1.2
Aonobuaka	328	3,552.6 acres (1,437.7 ha)	1.2
Koinawa	312	3,552.6 acres (1,437.7 ha)	1.2
Morikao	233	3,552.6 acres (1,437.7 ha)	1.2
Ewena	166	3,552.6 acres (1,437.7 ha)	1.2
Taburao	322	3,552.6 acres (1,437.7 ha)	1.2
Tebero	157	3,552.6 acres (1,437.7 ha)	1.2
Tabwiroa	237	3,552.6 acres (1,437.7 ha)	1.2
Tuarabu	560	3,552.6 acres (1,437.7 ha)	1.2
Tanimaiaki	274	3,552.6 acres (1,437.7 ha)	1.2
Tebwanga	310	3,552.6 acres (1,437.7 ha)	1.2
Aoneaba	51	3,552.6 acres (1,437.7 ha)	1.2
Tabontebike	379	3,552.6 acres (1,437.7 ha)	1.2
Uninhabited islets	0	215.5 acres (87.2 ha)	0
Abaiang total	5,502	4,318.3 acres (1,747.6 ha)	1.3

== Economy ==
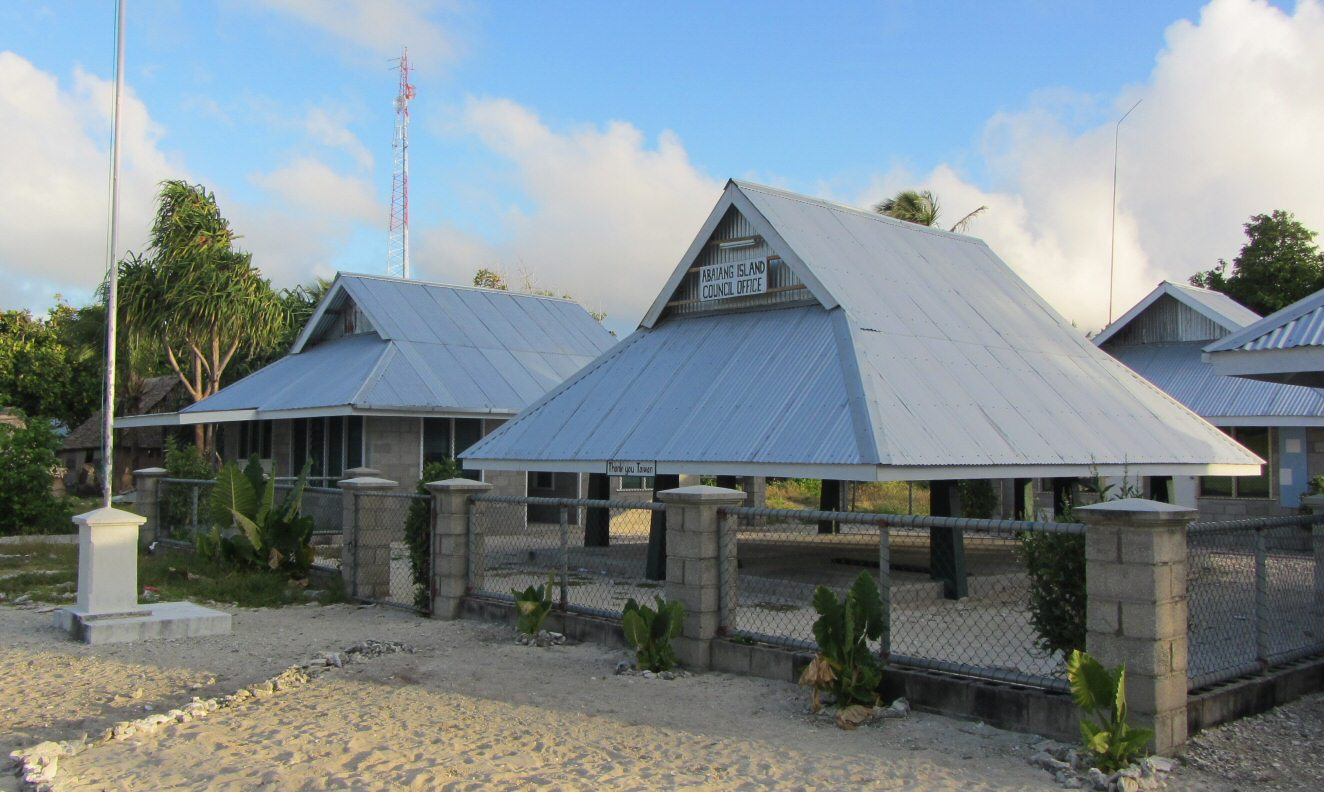
Council Office on Abaiang Island

Relative to other islands of Kiribati, Abaiang has some important economic advantages. Its large lagoon supports a striking diversity of coral and fish species, providing plentiful seafood to the local population and attracting tourists to the island from nearby South Tarawa. While the island is prone to drought, in normal years the rainfall is sufficient to support breadfruit, banana and papaya as well as the ubiquitous coconut. The closeness of Abaiang to Tarawa also facilitates a significant, though largely informal, trade in local food of all types.

However like all outer islands of Kiribati, Abaiang is basically a subsistence economy, with a small number of jobs, mainly working for the Government or Island Council. Other sources of income are copra production, and remittances from relatives working in South Tarawa, as crew on international vessels, or overseas.

Climate change has forced a change, as milkfish are not as common and plant life is dying off to the increased salt in the water table.

== Regional support for organic farming ==
The island of Abaiang has committed to having 100% of its farm agriculture produced organically. Another Pacific island to have made this commitment is Cicia in Fiji.

== Schools ==
There are ten primary schools on Abaiang, with a combined roll of 985 students in 2011.

At the secondary school level, in 2011 there were 212 students at the Ministry of Education school, Ueen Abaiang, which is located between the villages of Koinawa and Aonobuaka. A further 135 students are enrolled at St Joseph's College in Tabwiroa and 23 students at Steven Whitmee High School in Morikao, making 370 secondary school students in total. The two high schools at Morikao and Tabuiroa accommodate students from all over Kiribati who have passed the entrance examinations to get into the schools.

== History ==
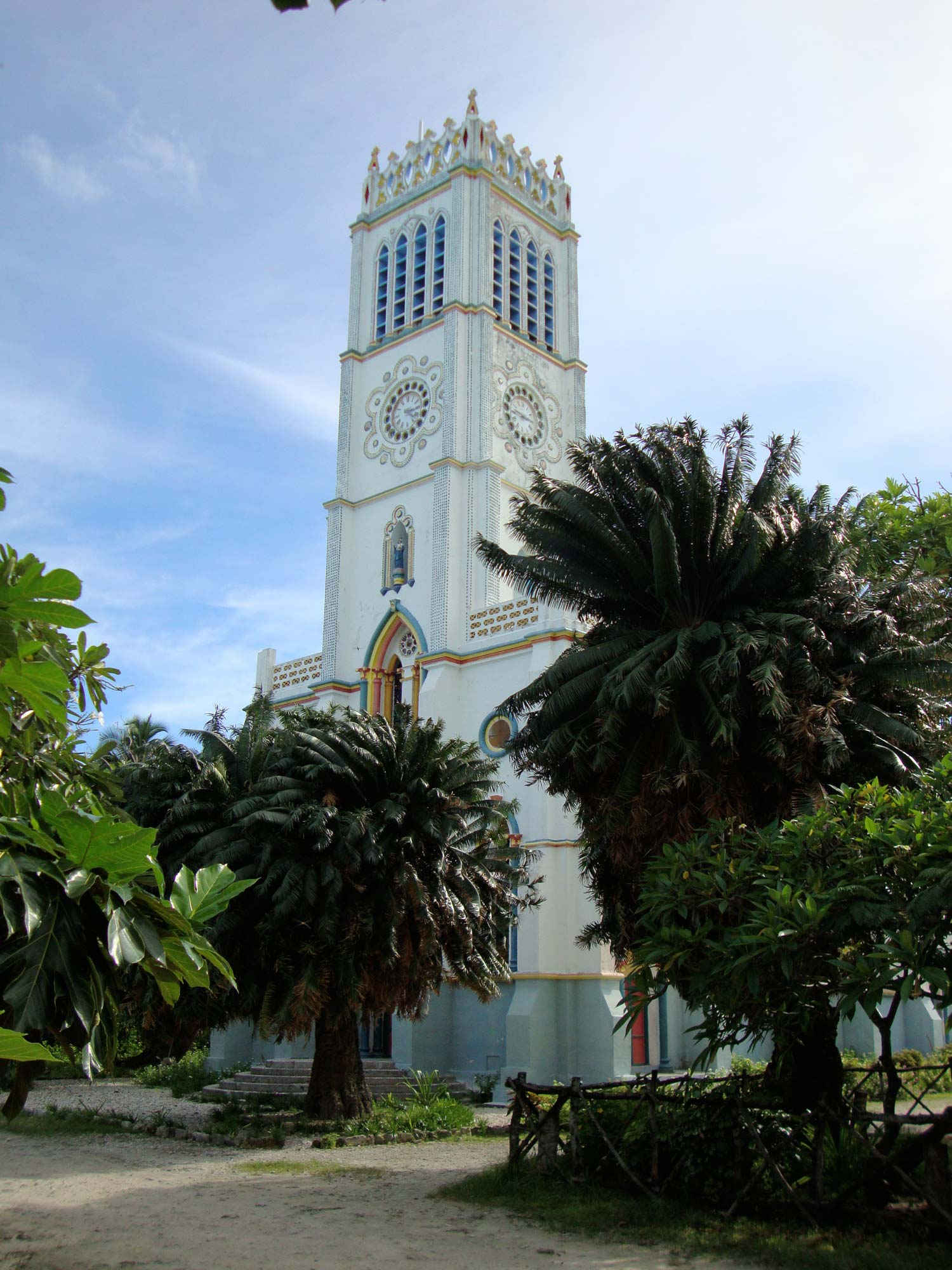
Koinawa cathedral (in 2009)

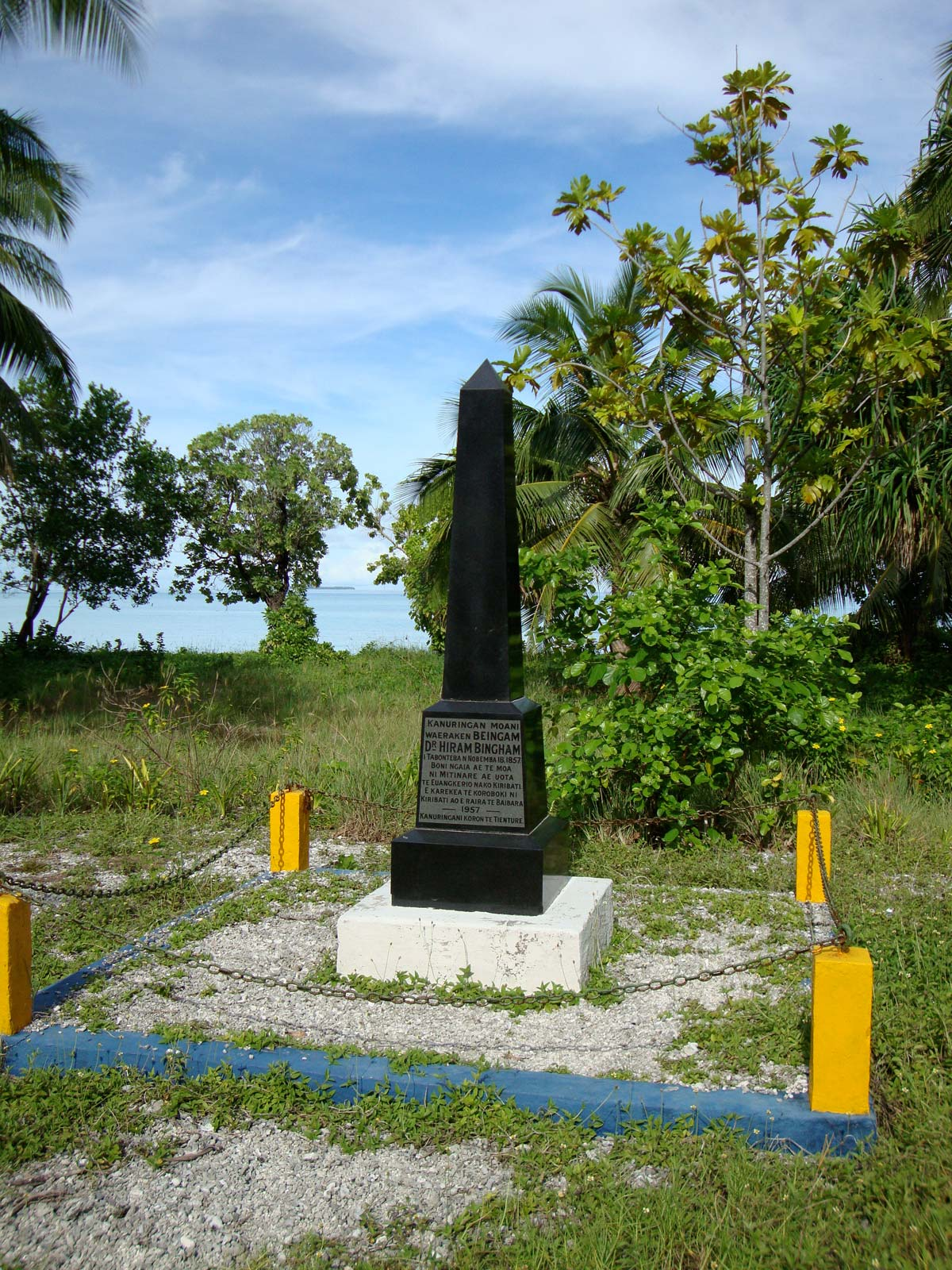
Monument in Koinawa to remember the arrival of Christianity on 18 November 1857

By tradition, the first inhabitants of Abaiang Island were known to be spirits, some of them created in Samoa and some in Abaiang. Years passed by and then Pacific Islanders came along followed then by the arrival of Thomas Gilbert, then Reverend Dr. Bingham and his team in 1857, international traders, beachcombers, whalers and even blackbirders. Colonizers then came along and hoisted the Union Jack on the island.

The first European to document the island was Thomas Gilbert in 1788. He named the island Matthew's Island, named for the owner of his ship, the Charlotte. Subsequently, errors changed the name to Charlotte Island. Then the first missionary to live in Kiribati arrived at Abaiang on 16 November 1857. He was Hiram Bingham II of the American Board, a Boston-based missionary group. This Hiram Bingham was the son of Hiram Bingham I who was one of the first and most influential missionaries to Hawaii. Hiram Bingham II and his wife were accompanied to Abaiang by Hawaiian pastor Joel Hulu Mahoe and his wife. Bingham landed at the village of Koinawa and a memorial was erected at the spot during the centennial celebrations in 1957.

During World War II, the Imperial Japanese Army occupied the island from December 1941 to November 1943. It was captured by the U.S. military and used as an offensive staging base.

== Main sights ==
Abaiang Post Office opened around 1910.

The Catholic community also has strong ties to Abaiang and completed the building of the imposing Church of Our Lady of the Rosary, also at Koinawa village, in October 1907. This work was done under the supervision of a priest from Belgium who was given the local name of Father Ioane. He lived and worked so long on Abaiang and became so well loved that the village of Borotiam was named in honour of his home country Belgium (Borotiam being the local vernacular for Belgium). This church celebrated its centennial in 2007 with a fresh paint job and a celebration whose special guest was the current President.

The foremost institution of Abaiang is St. Josephs College. The Principal during the country's silver jubilee celebrations was Paul Chilton, a British migrant. St. Joseph's College was founded in 1939. In the past 65 years it has gone from strength to strength and is now a leading centre for learning in Kiribati. Its alumni include both current President His Excellency Anote Tong, and previous incumbent Teburoro Tito.

== Visiting Abaiang ==
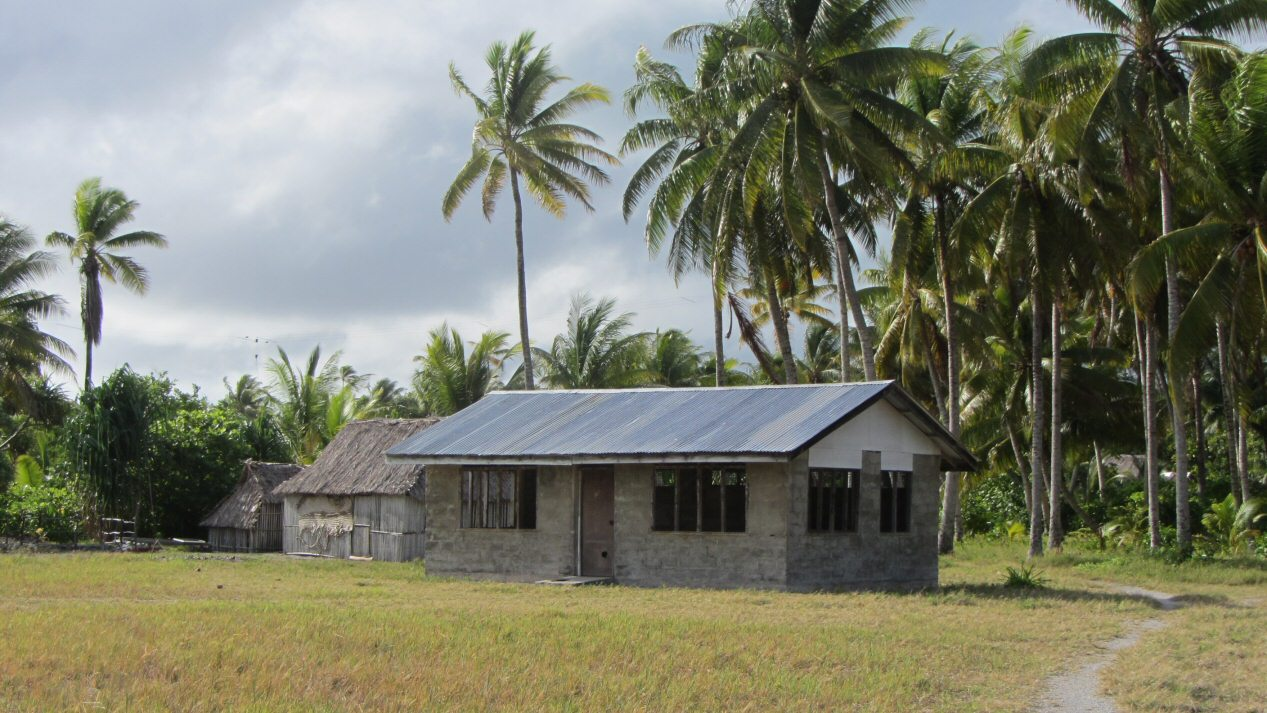
Abaiang airport building

=== Transport ===
The atoll is served by Abaiang Atoll Airport, situated between the villages of Tabwiroa and Tuarabu. Air Kiribati operates three flights a week that connect Abaiang with Marakei and the international airport at South Tarawa.

There are also regular speedboats and boat charters available from South Tarawa to Abaiang.

=== Distances ===
- To Marakei atoll: 40 kilometres (25 miles) (over sea)
- To Tarawa atoll: 11 kilometres (6.8 miles) (over sea)
- To South Tarawa (national capital, on Tarawa): 43 kilometres (27 miles) (over sea)

=== Accommodation ===
There are three guesthouses on Abaiang. The Island Council guest house is situated in Taburao village and welcomes tourists as well as providing accommodation for Government workers and other travellers. "Ouba Islet Resort" is an eco-tourism resort on Ouba island in the north-western perimeter of the atoll, which has been operating since July, 2006. "Teiria Islet Beach Escape" is a small resort on the islet of Teiria.

== In popular culture ==
Abaiang inspired the Italian comic book creator Hugo Pratt to imagine the fictional island of Escondida. It appears in his comic book story of Corto Maltese: The Ballad of the Salty Sea.
