= 2026 in Kiribati =

- Decades: 2000s; 2010s; 2020s
- See also: Other events of 2026; Timeline of Kiribati history

Events in the year 2026 in Kiribati.

== Incumbents ==
- President: Taneti Maamau
- Vice President: Teuea Toatu (until 15 November)

== Events ==
- 19 January – New Zealand Foreign Minister Winston Peters and Kiribati Vice-President Teuea Toatu sign a statement in Tarawa renewing New Zealand's aid assistance to Kiribati.

== Holidays ==
- 1 January – New Year's Day
- 8 March – Women's Day Holiday
- 7 April – National Health Day
- 14 April – Good Friday
- 17 April – Easter Monday
- 1 May – Labour Day
- 23 June – National Police Day
- 11 July – National Culture and Senior Citizens Day
- 11 July – Gospel Day
- 12 July – National day
- 15 July – Special public holiday
- 7 August – National Youth and Children's Day
- 6 October – Education Day
- 11 December – Human rights day
- 25 December – Christmas Day
- 26 December – Boxing Day

== Deaths ==
- 15 November – Teuea Toatu, vice-president (since 2019), minister of finance and economic development (since 2016) and MP (since 2016).

== See also ==
- History of Kiribati
- List of towns and villages in Kiribati
- Music of Kiribati
