= 2021 in Kiribati =

- Decades: 2000s; 2010s; 2020s
- See also: Other events of 2021; Timeline of Kiribati history

Events in the year 2021 in Kiribati.

== Incumbents ==
- President: Taneti Maamau
- Vice President: Teuea Toatu

== Events ==
Ongoing — COVID-19 pandemic in Kiribati

== Deaths ==
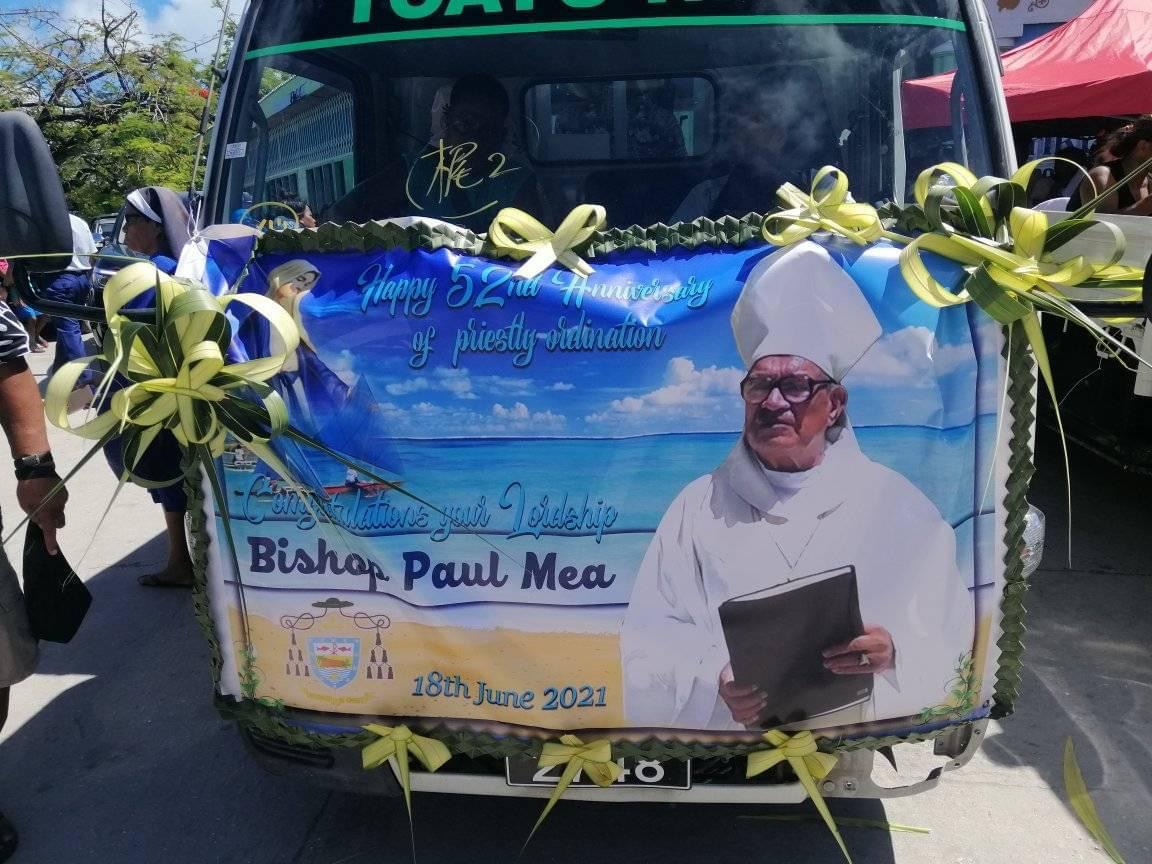
Paul Mea

- 24 June – Paul Mea, Roman Catholic prelate, bishop of Tarawa and Nauru (born 1939).

== See also ==
- History of Kiribati
