= Na Bakatokia =

High Chief of Makin and Butaritari
- Reign: 1884–1888
- Predecessor: Nan Teitei
- Successor: Na Bureimoa
- Died: 1888
- Father: Nan Teitimararoa
- Religion: Protestant

Na Bakatokia was the ninth high chief of Makin and Butaritari in the Gilbert Islands from 1884 until his death in 1888. He was the third son of Nan Teitimararoa to reign. A convert to Protestant Christianity, Na Bakatokia ruled under the influence of Robert Maka, one of two Hawaiian missionaries resident on Butaritari. The elders were jealous of Maka's hold over him, leading them to strip Na Bakatokia of all power but keep him as a figurehead. Due to intense competition between the foreign trading firms on Butaritari, the commercial centre of the Gilbert Islands at the time, Na Bakatokia was saddled with debt. Na Bureimoa, his paternal half-brother, succeeded him.

== Background ==
Na Bakatokia was the third of four sons of Nan Teitimararoa, the high chief of Butaritari and Makin in the Gilbert Islands (modern-day Kiribati). The eldest of the four brothers, Na Kaiea I, succeeded Teitimararoa as a young adult when the latter died in July 1852, and grew up to become a feared despot. Na Kaiea felt that Nan Teitei, the second brother, was too weak to rule effectively and thought that, though he was courageous, Na Bakatokia might not be capable enough for the chieftainship. Na Kaiea died without issue in 1879 and Nan Teitei inherited the position.

Nan Teitei was converted to Christianity by Robert Maka, one of two Hawaiian Congregationalist missionaries residing on Butaritari. Maka persuaded him to promulgate laws based on Christian ethics and divorce 16 of his 17 wives, which cut off a substantial amount of resources for the high chief customarily contributed by his in-laws. Like other Gilbertese chiefs advised by Hawaiian missionaries, Nan Teitei wrote to Kalākaua in 1882 and 1884, asking him to annex the Gilbert Islands into the Hawaiian Kingdom.

== Reign ==
Na Bakatokia succeeded Nan Teitei after the latter died on 13 February 1884, without any living children. Like Nan Teitei, he was a monogamous Christian convert who had Maka as an advisor. According to the American anthropologist Bernd Lambert, who conducted fieldwork on Makin from 1959 to 1961, Na Bakatokia had been living as an outcast on Makin prior to Nan Teitei's death. Living off the bitter fruit of the nan (Morinda citrifolia), he was close to starvation, and his body was covered with sores. However, the electors brought him to Butaritari and installed him so as not to offend the people of Makin; Na Bakatokia's mother—Nei Toakoi, Teitimararoa's principal wife—was the daughter of Nan Teakoi, a late headman of Makin.

Late in February 1884, Na Bakatokia wrote a letter to Kalākaua, addressing him as "our cousin and good friend of the Polynesian islands, King Kalākaua of the Hawaiian Islands and the Isles of Polynesia". (Note: Hawaiian: "ko makou hoahanau a makamaka maikai o na mokupuni Polunesia, Ka Moi Kalakaua, o ko Hawaii Paeaina a me na mokupuni o Polunesia") Na Bakatokia informed Kalākaua of Teitei's death, which was later reported on in the Hawaiian press, and renewed the friendship between Hawaii and Butaritari–Makin. He also asked that Prince Tiata, his 15-year-old heir, (Note: Prince Tiata is not mentioned in other sources. According to Stevenson, only Bureimoa, Bakatokia's brother and successor, had issue.) be educated in Honolulu to learn English, Hawaiian, military skills and other knowledge.

During Na Bakatokia's reign, competition intensified between the trading firms on Butaritari, which was the 19th-century commercial capital of the Gilbert Islands. Maka had introduced the usurious "clip" system, wherein the future produce of specific plots of a debtor's land was mortgaged until the debtor paid off their loan, that was co-opted by American traders. Bakatokia, whose wealth was already curtailed by his monogamy, was caught in the middle of the trade rivalries and the chieftainship fell into severe debt. In an effort to reduce the money he owed, Na Bakatokia began to levy fines as large as $100. Complaints by the German traders, who unsuccessfully petitioned their government to annex the Gilberts, led a German warship to visit Butaritari in 1888. The same year, Na Bakatokia welcomed a French warship, dispatched to support French Catholic missionaries on the other Gilbert Islands, that stopped at Butaritari.

According to In The South Seas (1896) by Robert Louis Stevenson, who stayed on Butaritari in 1889, Na Bakatokia was eventually deposed. The unimane—elders, whose councils governed villages—were resentful of their lack of influence over the high chief in recent decades. They had been overshadowed by the autocracy of Na Kaiea and Maka's hold over Teitei and Bakatokia. When rumours spread alleging Maka had boasted that he was second in Butaritari only to the king, the disgruntled elders gathered, summoned Na Bakatokia and stripped him of all power, although he was allowed to keep his title. The elders ruled in his stead. Na Bakatokia died in 1888 and Na Bureimoa, the youngest of Teitimararoa's sons, inherited both his office and his debts.
