= Teatumateatata =

High Chief of Makin and Butaritari
- Predecessor: Teauoki
- Successor: Teitimaroroa
- Regent: Manarara
- Born: c. 1780
- Died: c. 1840
- Wives: Nei Rabatanabuariki and 11 others
- Issue: Teitimaroroa and at least 6 others
- Father: Teauoki

Nan Teatumateatata (c. 1780 – c. 1840) was the fifth high chief of Makin and Butaritari. He was the last high chief to rule before European contact. After eliminating two pretenders to his title before he would have been killed himself, Nan Teatumateatata enjoyed a long and unchallenged reign. During the early 19th century, Nan Teatumateatata abdicated in favour of his son, Nan Teitimararoa.

== Life ==
Teatumateatata was the son of Teauoki, the fourth high chief of Butaritari and Makin. His name can be translated as "Brilliant Leader" or "The Chief With Great Insight". Before Teauoki died in the 1790s, he asked Manarara, his only living full brother, to serve as Teatumateatata's regent until the boy was old enough. Manarara ultimately tried to pass the chieftainship on to two of his sons—just as Teauoki had taken the title from another branch of his family—and most of the people recognised the new chiefs by giving them the gifts of food which were customarily for the high chief. However, the two pretenders believed that to fully attain the title, they needed to eliminate Teatumateata, who was living on Makin at the time. They planned to assassinate Teatumateatata in the maneaba of Butaritari Town, where the people usually gathered to perform dance and play games. However, Nan Temango, the headman of Makin and Teauoki's half-brother, had warned Teatumateatata of the plot beforehand.

Teatumateatata arrived at Butaritari, ostensibly to participate in the festivities. The day before he would have died, Teatumateatata, three of his brothers, the husband of a sister, and two of his followers slayed Manarana's sons. Teatumateatata helped bury them out of respect for their kinship. However, Nei Rabatanabuariki, Teatumateatata's principal wife and the full sister of the slain, threw her and Teatumateatata's infant son into the grave in protest. Insulted, Teatumateata angrily threw dirt on his baby, which was rescued by a bystander. Once Teatumateatata had become the undisputed chief, he removed all family members apart from his siblings and their descendants—or Temango and his descendants—from the aristocracy. His siblings and some of his children became aristocrats in Butaritari Town. Some other children of Teatumateata and his siblings founded lines of aristocrats and headmen in other villages.

Teatumateatata had a long and peaceful reign and amassed 12 wives. As Butaritari had been rediscovered by Europeans in 1788, (Note: By Captains Thomas Gilbert and John Marshall, after a forgotten sighting by Pedro Fernandes de Queirós in 1606) he lived during the early post-contact period. In the 1820s and 1830s, foreign ships started to visit Butaritari regularly and represented the earliest trade contacts. In exchange for fresh provisions, wood, the sexual services of nikiranroro (lit. 'remnants of the generation', unmarried women), and later bêche-de-mer and turtle shell, visiting whalers offered small items such as mirrors, pieces of low-grade iron, and tobacco. Since all the produce on Butaritari and Makin belonged to the high chief, and he was responsible for tending to strangers, Teatumateatata was most likely a prominent figure in early trade. The first beachcomber, Robert Wood, landed on Butaritari in 1834. Wood introduced innovations such as the fermentation of coconut toddy; adopted into an aristocratic family, Wood was followed by two more Europeans in 1835 and left aboard the USS Peacock of the United States Exploring Expedition in 1841; a year or so before, Teatumateatata had abdicated in favour of his son, Teitimaroroa, to ease Teatimaroroa's transition into the chieftainship.
