= 2022 in Kiribati =

- Decades: 2000s; 2010s; 2020s
- See also: Other events of 2022; Timeline of Kiribati history

Events in the year 2022 in Kiribati.

== Incumbents ==
- President: Taneti Maamau
- Vice President: Teuea Toatu

== Events ==
Ongoing — COVID-19 pandemic in Kiribati

- 20 January – The country announces a curfew and mandatory face masks after 36 passengers on a charter flight from Fiji test positive for COVID-19 upon arrival. The plane was the first international commercial flight to land in the country since March 2020. Kiribati reopened its borders on January 10.

Current event - 2022 Kiribati constitutional crisis.

== See also ==
- History of Kiribati
