= 2024 in Kiribati =

- Decades: 2000s; 2010s; 2020s
- See also: Other events of 2024; Timeline of Kiribati history

Events in the year 2024 in Kiribati.

== Incumbents ==
- President: Taneti Maamau
- Vice President: Teuea Toatu

== Events ==
- 26 April - Australian-born High Court justice David Lambourne is ordered deported from Kiribati following a long-running legal battle with the latter's government. He voluntarily leaves the country on 16 May.
- 14 August - 2024 Kiribati parliamentary election (first round): Kiribati islanders vote for the 45 members of the House of Assembly.
- 19 August - 2024 Kiribati parliamentary election (second round)
- 21 August - The Ministry of Foreign Affairs and Immigration announces the suspension or cancellation of all scheduled diplomatic visits to the country until 2025, citing concerns over their effect on the formation of a post-election government and inability to accommodate visitors while the process was ongoing.
- 25 October - 2024 Kiribati presidential election: Incumbent President Taneti Maamau of the Tobwaan Kiribati Party is re-elected to a third term.
- 1 November - Taneti Maamau is inaugurated to a third term as president.

== Holidays ==
- 1 January - New Year's Day
- 8 March – International Women's Day
- 29 March – Good Friday
- 1 April – Easter Monday
- 7 April – National Health Day
- 1 May – Labour Day
- 10 July – Gospel Day
- 11 July – National Culture and Senior Citizens Day
- 12 July – National day
- 5 August – Youth Day
- 5 October - Education Day
- 10 December – Human rights
- 25 December – Christmas Day
- 26 December – Boxing Day

== See also ==
- History of Kiribati
- List of towns and villages in Kiribati
- Music of Kiribati
