= Ministry of Finance and Economic Development =

Ministry of Finance and Economic Development may refer to:

- Ministry of Finance and Economic Development (Ethiopia)
- Ministry of Finance and Economic Development (Kiribati)
- Ministry of Finance and Economic Development (Mauritius)
- Sierra Leone Ministry of Finance and Economic Development
