= 2025 in Kiribati =

- Decades: 2000s; 2010s; 2020s
- See also: Other events of 2025; Timeline of Kiribati history

Events in the year 2025 in Kiribati.

== Incumbents ==
- President: Taneti Maamau
- Vice President: Teuea Toatu

== Events ==
- 27 January – The New Zealand Government reviews its bilateral aid programme to Kiribati after Kiribati President Taneti Maamau cancelled three pre-arranged meetings including one scheduled for mid January 2025. The NZ Government had wanted to discuss how NZ$102 million worth of aid money allocated to Kiribati between 2021 and 2024 was being spent.

== Holidays ==
- 1 January - New Year's Day
- 7 March – International Women's Day
- 7 April – National Health Day
- 18 April – Good Friday
- 21 April – Easter Monday
- 1 May – Labour Day
- 23 June – National Police Day
- 10 July – Gospel Day
- 11 July – National Culture and Senior Citizens Day
- 12 July – National day
- 14 July – National day observed
- 1 August – National Youth and Children's Day
- 6 October - Education Day
- 12 December – Human rights day
- 25 December – Christmas Day
- 26 December – Boxing Day

== See also ==
- History of Kiribati
- List of towns and villages in Kiribati
- Music of Kiribati
