= Nan Tabu =

- Nan Tabu with wife and daughters, 1908

High Chief of Makin and Butaritari
- Reign: 1910–1912
- Predecessor: Na Bureimoa
- Successor: Na Kaiea II
- Born: 1861
- Died: 1912 (aged 50–51)
- Wives: Nei Kammakiata; Nei Bukanibeti
- Issue: Nei Tabanou; Na Kaiea II; Na Akoi; Na Koriri; Nei Koin
- Father: Na Bureimoa
- Mother: Nei Taonuea

Nan Tabu (Note: Lambert (1963) spelled the name Tābu, which indicates the first vowel is lengthened in duration.) (1861–1912) was the eleventh high chief of Makin and Butaritari, the northernmost of the Gilbert Islands, from 1910 until his death in 1912. He was the sole son and successor of Na Bureimoa. The Gilbert Islands became a British protectorate in 1892, and Nan Tabu ruled under British rule.

Nan Tabu had three children with his first wife, Nei Kammakiata, and two more with his second wife, Nei Bukanibeti. Na Kaiea II, a son of Nei Kammakiata, succeeded Nan Tabu after his death. Na Koriri, the son of Nei Bukanibeti, succeeded Na Kaiea.

== Early life ==
Nan Tabu (Note: In the Gilbertese language, personal articles are sometimes used before names. Most often, articles appear before names which are also words. For example, tabu is also a noun meaning "tub". The personal articles used before names of males on Makin and Butaritari are Na, Nan, Nam and Nang. The variant used depends on the sound the name begins with. The equivalents of these four articles outside of Makin and Butaritari are Te, Ten, Tem and Teng, whereas the article used before the names of females, Nei, is the same in all dialects.) was born in 1861, the first child of Na Bureimoa and Nei Taonuea. (Note: Bernd Lambert, an American anthropologist who studied social organisation and stratification on Makin and Butaritari, did not report that Na Bureimoa had children other than Nan Tabu. However, Robert Louis Stevenson, who visited Butaritari in 1889, wrote that Na Bureimoa had "a grown son, Natiata, and a daughter three years old". An 1884 letter from Na Bakatokia, Na Bureimoa's predecessor, to Kalākaua, the King of Hawaii, requested for his 15-year-old heir Prince Tiata to receive an education in Honolulu and learn English, Hawaiian, and military skills, among other knowledge. Tiata cosigned the letter. It is unclear if "Tiata" is the same person as Nan Tabu. If so, the reason that Na Bakatokia referred to him as his heir is also unclear, and the age he is described as does not match the birth year of 1861 that Lambert gave for Nan Tabu.) In 1888, Na Bureimoa succeeded his brother, Na Bakatokia, as high chief of Makin and Butaritari in the Gilbert Islands. The Gilbert Islands became a British protectorate in 1892, but the high chiefs retained much of their influence until long after.

Nan Tabu had three children with his first wife, Nei Kammakiata, including a daughter, Nei Koin, and two sons, Na Kaiea II (born 1887) and Na Akoi. He had another son, Na Koriri, and another daughter, Nei Koin, with his second wife, Nei Bukanibeti. Chiefs (uea)—that is, the high chief's children, siblings, and often his siblings' children—once indicated their status through extreme corpulence. Nan Tabu's children spent periods of time in a screened-off house and were overfed, while their skin was rubbed with grated coconut kernel in order to make them smooth-skinned.

Ramages (utu), made up of people descended from a common ancestor, held collective ownership of land on Makin and Butaritari. Two different ramages often held rights to the same plots of land. In such cases, one ramage was composed of aristocrats (toka), who had to be descendants of the 18th-century high chief Nan Teauoki, and the other was subordinate to the aristocratic ramage. Nan Tabu's first wife, Nan Kammakiata, was the eldest of her generation within Tutara, her ramage in the village of Makin. Although the founder of Tutara was a descendant of Nan Teauoki, it was subordinate to another ramage named Ta Kanawa.

== Reign ==
In 1910, Nan Tabu succeeded his father to become the eleventh high chief of Makin and Butaritari. (Note: Although Lambert dates Nan Tabu's accession to 1910, the photograph of Nan Tabu in this article is dated to 1908, but is labeled könig (king).) He and the high chiefs after him were elected by the elders who led ramages in the main villages of Makin and Butaritari (which shared their names with their islands). The other chiefs also had a voice in the decision. However, there were succession disputes between these parties, one of which led to the abolition of the chieftainship in 1963.

As high chief, Nan Tabu was able to make the ramage of Tutara independent from Ta Kanawa after a member of the latter group referred to Tutara as his "domestic animals". Because Nan Tabu's heir, Na Kaiea II, had inherited membership of Tutara from his mother, it was considered an affront to him. During Nan Tabu's reign, a preliminary lands register was drawn up for Makin and Butaritari, heralding later reforms which would lead to the individualisation of land tenure on the two islands. Nan Tabu reigned for just two years. After his death in 1912, Na Kaiea II became the new high chief. Another one of Nan Tabu's sons, Na Koriri, succeeded Na Kaiea.
