= Tewai Village =

Coordinates: 1°26′42″S 75°00′43″E

Tewai is the northernmost motu in South Tabiteuea, Kiribati. Tewai has been settled since precolonial times and had a population of 338 at the 2010 census. Tewai has a maneaba and a school. A causeway connects it to Taungaeaka to the south.

== History ==
In precolonial times, Tabiteuea was divided into numerous aono (autonomous communities) such as Tewai. The aono were governed through maneaba (meeting houses), where unimane (elders) deliberated community affairs.

In the 1860s, Tewai became the southern stronghold of te Buraeniman (lit. 'the bird feathers'), the Tabiteuean cult of Tioba (Jehovah) which syncretized indigenous and Christian beliefs. Conflict between te Buraeniman and militant Protestant converts led to the Tabiteuean religious wars.

During World War II, a group of American men were shipwrecked on Tewai. The people of Tewai took care of the Americans until they were rescued, and the village assumed the honorary name of Amerika to commemorate the experience.

== Geography ==
Tewai is one of the northernmost places of South Tabiteuea and is located in the eastern reef hem, in an area with many small motu. The place itself is located on a headland to the interior of the lagoon. There is a school in the suburb Tebukie. Tewai is connected to the southern Taungaeaka by the Tewai Causeway. In the village there is a traditional Reunity House: Tewai Maneaba.

In the northwest, the Motu Arakeaka and Tetongo join. The nearest place to North Tabiteuea is Aiwa about 12 km away.
