= 2023 in Kiribati =

- Decades: 2000s; 2010s; 2020s
- See also: Other events of 2023; Timeline of Kiribati history

Events in the year 2023 in Kiribati.

== Incumbents ==
- President: Taneti Maamau
- Vice President: Teuea Toatu

== Events ==
Ongoing — COVID-19 pandemic in Kiribati

- 30 January – Prime Minister of Fiji Sitiveni Rabuka confirms that Kiribati will rejoin the Pacific Islands Forum after leaving it last year over a dispute. Rabuka met Kiribati president Taneti Mamau to discuss the issue.

== See also ==
- History of Kiribati
