= 2020 in Kiribati =

- Decades: 2000s; 2010s; 2020s
- See also: Other events of 2020; Timeline of I-Kiribati history

Events from 2020 in Kiribati.

== Incumbents ==
- President: Taneti Maamau
- Vice-President: Teuea Toatu

== Events ==
Ongoing – COVID-19 pandemic in Oceania

- 1 February – The government put all visas from China on hold and requires new arrivals to fill in a health form and travellers from countries with COVID-19 to go through a self-quarantine period.
- 28 March – Despite not having any cases, President Taneti Maamau declares a state of emergency.
- 10 September – The government announces it will keep the borders closed until the end of the year to keep the country free of the virus. Exceptions include repatriations, humanitarian flights, and the transport of essential supplies into the country. A group of 20 I-Kiribati people in the Marshall Islands are the first set to be repatriated.
- 14 September – It is announced that President Taneti Maamau and the leaders of Palau, Nauru, the Federated States of Micronesia and the Marshall Islands will host an in-person meeting. President of Nauru Lionel Aingimea says that the leaders agreed to attend Palau's Independence Day on October 1 as the five Pacific countries remain free of COVID-19.
