= Na Koriri =

- Na Koriri and his wife, 1908

High Chief of Makin and Butaritari
- Reign: 1954–1959
- Predecessor: Na Kaiea II
- Successor: Na Uraura
- Died: 1959
- Issue: 11, including Na Uraura
- Father: Nan Tabu
- Mother: Nei Bukanibeti
- Religion: Catholic
- Occupation: Magistrate

Na Koriri was the thirteenth high chief of Makin and Butaritari, the northernmost of the Gilbert Islands, from 1954 until his death in 1959. He reigned under British colonial rule.

Na Koriri was the third son of Nan Tabu, the eleventh high chief of Makin and Butaritari, and the half-brother of Na Kaiea II, the twelfth high chief. After Na Kaiea II died without issue in 1954, Na Koriri became the new high chief. In addition to serving as the Native Magistrate of Makin, he became the Native Magistrate of Butaritari after his accession. Na Koriri was also an excellent midwife and canoe builder. He supervised the construction of Taoba, which was 40 feet (12 m) long and one of the largest canoes in the Gilbert Islands.

Na Koriri died in 1959 and his eldest son, Na Uraura, succeeded him. After Na Uraura died himself in 1963, a succession dispute led to the British Resident Commissioner abolishing the high chieftainship of Makin and Butaritari.

== Life ==
Na Koriri (Note: In the Gilbertese language, personal articles are sometimes used before names. For males, the articles Na, Nan, Nam and Nang are used in the Butaritari–Makin dialect. On other islands, the articles Te, Ten, Tem or Teng are used instead. Which variant is used depends on the letter that the name starts with. For females, the article is Nei and is the same for all dialects. Personal articles are most often used when the name is also a word in Gilbertese, e.g. koriri is a noun meaning "the extreme portion of a coconut leaf used in incantation".) was the fourth of five children born to Nan Tabu (1861–1912), who became the eleventh high chief of Makin and Butaritari in 1910. His mother, Nei Bukanibeti, was the second wife of Nan Tabu. In 1912, Na Kaiea II (1887–1954), Na Tabu's eldest son and Na Koriri's half-brother, became the twelfth high chief. He died without issue in 1954.

Na Koriri, the Native Magistrate of Makin, was a well-respected man and was seen as the logical choice to succeed his half-brother. (Note: Na Kaiea II had a full brother, Na Akoi, who was older than Na Koriri, but he had already died without issue.) After his accession, he became the Native Magistrate of Butaritari as well. Some people thought that letting him be high chief and magistrate at the same time gave him too much power, because high chiefs were considered immune to criticism. (Note: Disrespect or criticism of the high chief was believed to render the offender maraia (cursed), which meant that he or she was bound to suffer some sort of misfortune. Typical examples included falling out of a coconut tree, and the illness or death of the offender's children.)

The high chief's lands were worked by commoners, and their produce was more than enough for the high chief's household to live on. However, despite not having to work, the high chief and his relatives pursued tasks that interested them. In the main village of Makin, Na Koriri and his children significantly expanded and cultivated a babai (Cyrtosperma merkusii) pit that Na Kaiea II had bought. Na Koriri also excelled at midwifery, an area typically reserved for women, and canoe building. He supervised the construction of a 40-foot (12 m) long canoe named the Taoba, one of the largest in the Gilbert Islands. He was assisted by just four men, whose food he supplied himself.

== Succession ==
Na Koriri had 11 children. Although precedent favored Na Uraura (1917–1963), Na Koriri's eldest son, succeeding him as high chief, his niece Nei Neri and his nephew Na Binauea were also being considered for the role on Makin. When Na Koriri died in 1959, the elders of Butaritari quickly chose Na Uraura as his successor. Offended at not having been consulted, the elders of Makin did not send representatives to Na Uraura's installation on Butaritari and insisted that a separate ceremony be held on Makin. The Protestant minority supported Nei Neri, believing that Na Kaiea II and Na Koriri had made substantial donations to the Catholic mission with funds collected from all of their subjects.

Na Uraura became the final high chief of Makin and Butaritari. After his death in 1963, the elders of Makin and Butaritari agreed to offer the high chieftainship to Nei Neri, but the chiefs and their relatives put forward various alternative candidates. When they could not agree, the Resident Commissioner V. J. Andersen abolished the high chieftainship, putting an end to the centuries-long dynasty.
