= Responses to the COVID-19 pandemic in May 2021 =

Major events in a virus pandemic

This article documents the chronology of the response to the COVID-19 pandemic in May 2021, which originated in Wuhan, China in December 2019. Some developments may become known or fully understood only in retrospect. Reporting on this pandemic began in December 2019.

== Reactions and measures in the United Nations ==
=== 7 May ===
- The World Health Organization has given emergency authorization for the use of the Sinopharm BIBP vaccine.

== Reactions and measures in the Americas ==
=== 14 May ===
- The City of Toronto has cancelled all event permits until 6 September 2021 in order to slow the spread of COVID-19.

=== 10 May ===
- People from Ecuador, El Salvador, Venezuela, were reported to travel to the US to get COVID vaccines as those countries were affected by vaccine supply shortages.

=== 17 May ===
- Panama mandates the use of face shields in addition to face masks in public transportation.

=== 19 May ===
- Peruvians are reported to travel to the US for vaccine tourism.

=== 21 May ===
- San Marino is reported to offer vaccines to tourists to increase tourism.

=== 24 May ===
- Thai citizens are reported to travel to the US for vaccine tourism.

=== 19 May ===
- Argentinians are reported to travel to the US for vaccine tourism.

=== 29 May ===
- Governor Baker of Massachusetts rescinded most of the COVID-19 restrictions as of 29 May.

== Reactions and measures in Europe ==
=== 8 May ===
- In England, people start returning to brick and mortar supermarkets.
- The British Secretary of State for Transport Grant Shapps announced that several countries would be upgraded to England's new "green list" in mid-May; which allows quarantine-free travel with testing at the border and two days after returning. From 12 May, travellers from Nepal and the Maldives will be allowed to travel to England without undergoing quarantine. From 17 May, travellers from Australia, Brunei, the Falkland Islands, the Faroe Islands, Gibraltar, Iceland, Israel (including Jerusalem), New Zealand, Portugal (including the Azores and Madeira) and Singapore will be allowed to enter England without undergoing quarantine.

== Reactions and measures in South, East and Southeast Asia ==
=== 3 May ===
- The Malaysian Government has re-imposed two-week Movement Control Order restrictions in Selangor, Kuala Lumpur, Penang, Johor and Sarawak in response to a nationwide spike in COVID-19 cases. Schools will be closed and social and religious gatherings will be banned. While some economic activities will be allowed, eateries can only provide takeaway services.

=== 4 May ===
- India suspends the Indian Premier League in response to COVID-19 cases surpassing 20 million cases nationwide.

=== 5 May ===
- Malaysian authorities have reimposed movement control order restrictions in certain districts in Selangor, the federal territory of Kuala Lumpur, and Perak for two weeks between 6 and 20 May.

=== 8 May ===
- Malaysian Senior Minister (Security) Ismail Sabri Yaakob confirmed that the Malaysian Government would not implement a nationwide movement control order but will instead impose targeted movement restrictions in response to local outbreaks.
- The Malaysian Government has banned all interstate and inter-district travel without police approval between 10 May and 6 June 2021.

=== 10 May ===
- Malaysian Prime Minister Muhyiddin Yassin announced that a nationwide Movement Control Order lockdown would be reinstated from 12 May to 7 June. Dining in, social activities and shopping areas will be suspended although workers are allowed to commute between work and home. Inter-district and inter-state travel are also banned.

=== 17 May ===
- The Malaysian Health Ministry has indicated it may implement a total shutdown in Selangor if current Movement Control Order restrictions are unable to curb a sharp spike in community cases.

=== 26 May ===
On 26 May, Asahi Shimbun, which is one of the Japanese mainstream media outlets and listed as Tokyo 2020 official sponsors, urged Japan's prime minister Yoshihide Suga to cancel the Tokyo Olympics. The newspaper pointed to widespread public opposition to the Olympics and criticised the International Olympic Committee for its heavy-handed insistence that the Games would go ahead this summer regardless of the coronavirus situation in Japan.

=== 28 May ===
- Malaysian Prime Minister Muhyiddin Yassin has announced that a nationwide "total lockdown" will be imposed on all social and economic sectors in Malaysia from 1 June to 14 June 2021. Under this lockdown, only essential economic and social services will be allowed to operate.

== Reactions and measures in the Western Pacific ==
=== 1 May ===
- Most of Fiji has been placed into lockdown for 56 hours between 8pm 1 May to 4am local time on 3 May 2021 following the detection of an Indian variant of COVID-19. No businesses will be allowed to operate in Fiji during that period.
- The New Zealand Ministry of Health has advised several travellers who traveled from Brisbane Airport to New Zealand on 29 April to self-isolate and seek a COVID-19 test after a traveller who had traveled from Papua New Guinea and mingled with New Zealand-bound travellers tested positive for COVID-19.

=== 3 May ===
- New Zealand Prime Minister Jacinda Ardern and Cook Islands Prime Minister Mark Brown agreed to establish a travel bubble between New Zealand and the Cook Islands commencing 17 May. Travelers have to be present for at least 14 days in either NZ or the Cook Islands in order to participate in the travel bubble.

=== 5 May ===
- In the Australian state of New South Wales, mask wearing requirements and limits on visitors have been imposed in Greater Sydney, the Blue Mountains and Wollongong following a local community outbreak involving an individual with no physical link to travel or border control/quarantine hotels and workers.

=== 10 May ===
- The New Zealand Government has announced that 500 spaces a fortnight will be allocated over the next ten months for skilled and critical workers including agricultural and horticultural Recognised Seasonal Employer (RSE) workers, and construction workers for the Auckland City Rail Link and Wellington's Transmission Gully Motorway.

=== 17 May ===
- Quarantine free travel between New Zealand and the Cook Islands commences today.

=== 18 May ===
- New Zealand Health Minister Andrew Little announced that the Government would seek to amend Section 23 of the Medicines Act 1981 after a High Court judgement ruling that the Government's decision to approve the Pfizer–BioNTech COVID-19 vaccine was problematic since it exceeded the powers of the Medicines Act.

=== 25 May ===
- In response to nine community transmissions over the past two days, restrictions on social gatherings, visits, and travel were placed on the Greater Melbourne area until 4 June 2021.

=== 27 May ===
- In response to rising community cases, the Australian state of Victoria entered into its fourth statewide lockdown for seven days until 11:59pm on 3 June 2021. Other Australian states have imposed travel restrictions on travelers from Victoria while New Zealand has suspended its travel bubble with the state.

== See also ==
- Timeline of the COVID-19 pandemic in May 2021
- Responses to the COVID-19 pandemic
