= Nakaa Beach =

Makin
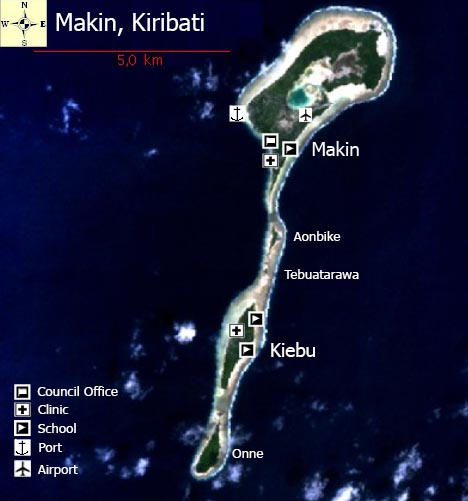

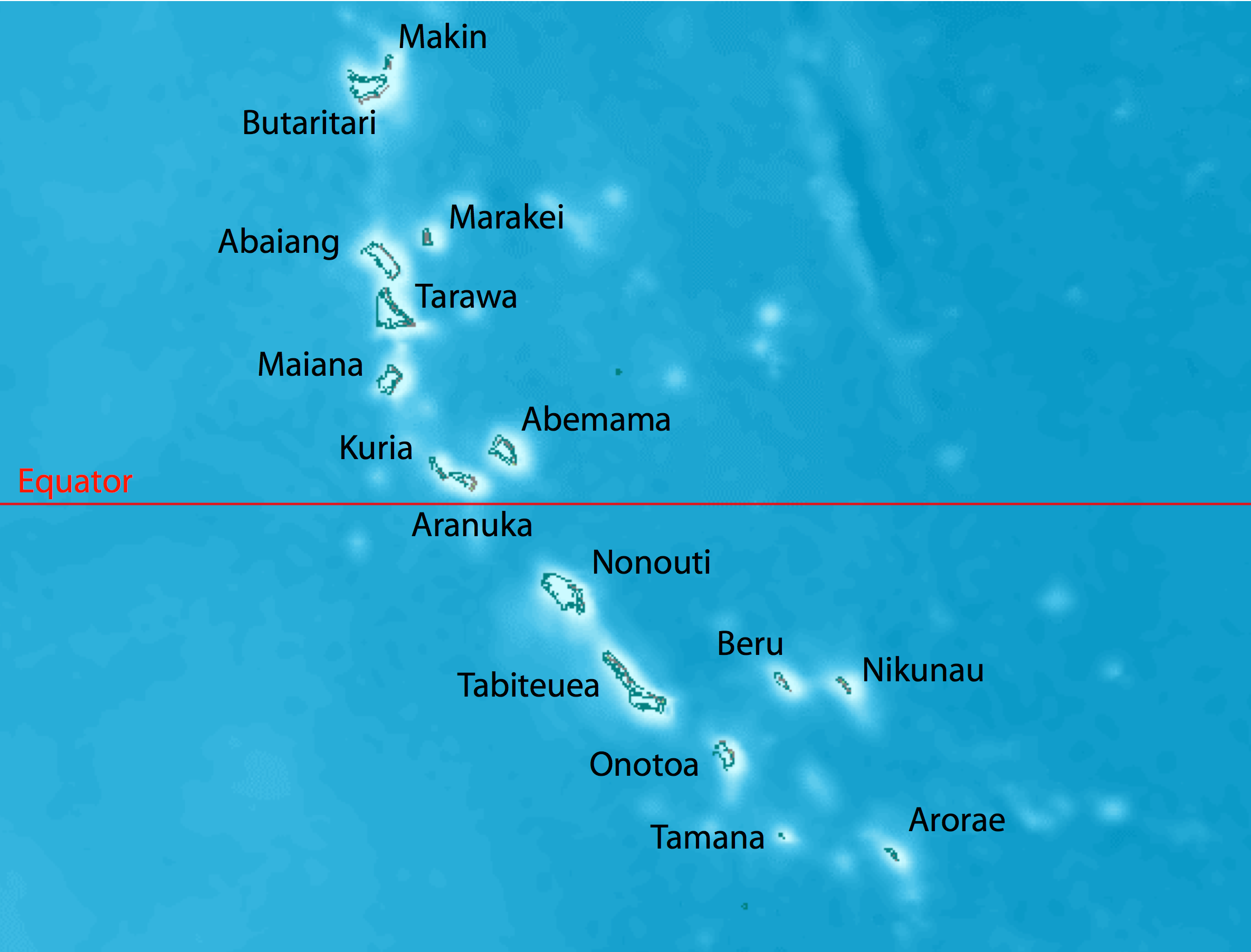

Geography
- Location: Pacific Ocean
- Coordinates: 3°23′N 173°00′E
- Archipelago: Gilbert Islands

Administration
- Kiribati

Nakaa Beach is located at the northern tip of Makin Atoll in Kiribati's Gilbert Islands. It is an important site in the traditional mythology of the island group, being the departing point for the spirits of the dead heading to the underworld.

Nakaa is the legendary guardian of the gateway to the place of the dead.
