= Teitimararoa =

Nan Teitimararoa

High Chief of Butaritari and Makin
- Reign: c. 1840 – July 1852
- Predecessor: Teatumateatata
- Successor: Kaiea I
- Died: July 1852
- Wives: 7
- Issue: Kaiea I Teitei; Bakatokia; Bureimoa
- Father: Teatumateatata

Nan Teitimararoa (Note: Bernd Lambert (1963) spelled the name Te-iti-ma-raroa, separating each constituent morpheme with a hyphen.) was the sixth high chief of Butaritari and Makin. Teitimararoa was incumbent by April 1841 and reigned until his death in July 1852.

In the 1840s, European ships were visiting Butaritari and Makin more frequently. Trade became a regular part of life. Teitimararoa regulated trade with Europeans and became involved with a number of traders. He became a close associate of Richard Randell, an Englishman who settled on Butaritari in 1846, bartering for coconut oil to sell to passing ships.

Teitimararoa had seven wives and numerous children. He had succeeded his father, Teatumateatata, and was succeeded in turn by his four eldest sons: Kaiea I, Teitei, Bakatokia, and Bureimoa. Na Uraura, the last high chief, was his great-great-grandson.

== Life ==
Teitimararoa was a son of Teatumateatata, the fifth high chief of Butaritari and Makin. His name means 'lightning from afar'. (Note: Gilbertese te iti 'lightning' + ma + raroa 'remoteness, distance') Teitimararoa was adopted by three of Teatumateatata's brothers-in-law, who the chief had banished to Bikaati for trying to exclude their sister—his wife—from a share in their property. Teatumateatata gave each brother a third of Bikaati to ensure that Teitimararoa was well cared for and they maintained a special relationship. When the United States Exploring Expedition surveyed the Gilbert Islands in April 1841, Teatumateatata had already abdicated in favour of Teitimararoa. By retiring early while continuing to play a role in governance, aging chiefs helped ease the transition for their heirs.

In the 1840s, visits by European and American whalers escalated rapidly and trade became a part of life. The Gilbertese became fond of tobacco. According to oral tradition, Teitimararoa was the first person from Butaritari to try it. A chronicler records he got it from the first ship that engaged in trade on Butaritari, whose captain was recorded as Kabunare, and which arrived sometime after the Exploring Expedition left. He implemented the law of totomataniwi, which meant that his subjects had to let him sample any tobacco they obtained first. However, he later abolished totomataniwi after a crowd came to his house with all their tobacco, leading him to fall ill and faint.

In 1846, the British traders Richard Randell—known to the natives as Teng Koakoa ('the sharp one')—and George Durant landed on Tikurere and began bartering for coconut oil, which they sold to passers-by ships. After learning the Gilbertese language and gaining Teitimararoa's trust, Randell was allowed to establish a trading post at Ukiangang, just 3 miles (4.8 km) from the chief's village. He became a supporter of and translator for the royal family. Since the high chief was considered the owner of all produce on Butaritari and Makin—including coconut oil—it would have been impossible for Randell not to conduct business via Teitimararoa. In their early days, he and Durant would have been equivalent to middlemen, buying oil from Teitimararoa and selling to foreign ships. Although Randell had "most favoured" status, Teitimararoa also conducted business with other traders and captains. Teitimararoa died in July 1852. He had had seven wives. His sons—Kaiea I, Teitei, Bakatokia and Bureimoa—followed him in succession.

== Notes ==
See Trussel and Groves (2003).
