= Ministry of Finance and Economic Development (Kiribati) =

Government ministry of Kiribati

The Ministry of Finance and Economic Development (MFED, in Gilbertese, Botaki ibukin te mwane ao karikirake) is a government ministry of Kiribati, headquartered in South Tarawa.

The Minister is responsible for:

- Development of Fiscal and Economic Policy
- Government Investments
- Government revenue and expenditure
- Economic Development Committee (DCC) Secretariat
- National Development Strategy (NDS)
- Development Planning and Aid Administration
- Government Financial and Accounting Services
- Internal Auditing
- Customs
- Taxation
- Exchange Control
- Government Statistics and National Census
- Banking (including Bank of Kiribati and Development Bank of Kiribati. The World Bank, International Monetary Fund. Asian Development Bank and other non-Government Aid Agencies)
- Kiribati Insurance Corporation
- Managing Government Liabilities (Loans and Guarantees)
- Procurement Act

== Ministers ==
- Tiwau Awira, (1979-1983)
- Boanareke Boanareke, (1983-1987)
- Teatao Teannaki, (1987-1991)
- Taomati Iuta, (1991-1994)
- Beniamina Tinga, (1994-2003)
- Nabuti Mwemwenikarawa, (2003–2007)
- Natan Teewe, (2007–2011)
- Tom Murdoch, (2011–2016)
- Teuea Toatu, (2016–)
