= COVID-19 pandemic in Kiribati =

- Disease: COVID-19
- Pathogen: SARS-CoV-2
- Location: Kiribati
- First outbreak: Wuhan, China
- Index case: Betio, South Tarawa
- Arrival date: 18 May 2021
- Confirmed cases: 5,085
- Deaths: 24
- Fatality rate: 0.47%
- Vaccinations: 81,474 (fully vaccinated)

Government website
- https://covid19.gov.ki/

The COVID-19 pandemic in Kiribati was part of the worldwide pandemic of coronavirus disease 2019 (COVID-19) caused by severe acute respiratory syndrome coronavirus 2 (SARS-CoV-2). The virus was confirmed to have reached Kiribati on 18 May 2021.

== Background ==
On 12 January 2020, the World Health Organization (WHO) confirmed that a novel coronavirus was the cause of a respiratory illness in a cluster of people in Wuhan City, Hubei Province, China, which was reported to the WHO on 31 December 2019.

The case fatality ratio for COVID-19 has been much lower than SARS of 2003, but the transmission has been significantly greater, with a significant total death toll.

== Timeline ==
Cases

Deaths

=== 2020 ===
On 1 February 2020, the government of Kiribati put all visas from China on hold and required new arrivals to fill in a health form and travellers from countries with the COVID-19 outbreaks to go through a self-quarantine period. Despite not having any cases, on 28 March, President Taneti Maamau declared a state of emergency.

On 10 September, the government announced it would keep the borders closed until the end of the year to keep the country free of the virus. Some exceptions would be made, including repatriations, humanitarian flights and the transport of essential supplies into the country. A group of 20 I-Kiribati people in the Marshall Islands were the first set to be repatriated.

On 19 November, the government repatriated 62 citizens, who had been stranded abroad since February, on a chartered Fiji Airways flight. Upon arrival, residents underwent a mandatory 14-day quarantine at Bikenibeu, Tarawa.

=== 2021 ===
By 15 May 2021, Kiribati had repatriated 1,400 I-Kiribati stranded abroad without importing any positive cases. The pandemic led to the loss of I-Kiribati seafarers' jobs because of the requirement to present a negative PCR test to return to work, and a lack of a machine to perform tests in Kiribati. On 18 May 2021, President Taneti Maamau announced the first positive case, a local seafarer returning from Papua New Guinea on a ship quarantined in Betio port. Two days later, a second positive case was detected on the same ship. The same day, a curfew was imposed. On 25 May, the repatriation program was suspended to deal with positive cases. Minister of Health, Dr. Tinte Itinteang, reported that a second I-Kiribati fisherman had been identified and had recovered.

=== 2022 ===
Kiribati re-opened its border to international travelers on January 10, 2022. The border had been closed since March 2020. All international arrivals would be processed through a single entry point on South Tarawa. Days later, the first international commercial flight in almost two years - a charter flight run by the Church of Jesus Christ of Latter-day Saints from Fiji - landed in Kiribati. 36 of the 54 passengers on the plane tested positive for COVID-19 upon arrival. A local I-Kiribati security guard at the quarantine center in Bikenibeu also tested positive after contact with the plane's passengers. The country had only recorded two COVID-19 cases prior to the plane's arrival. In response to the larger number of cases from the flight, the government announced a nationwide curfew beginning on January 19, 2022, and made mask-wearing compulsory under its "alert level 2 tier in its COVID-19 alert level system."

On 22 January, the country went into lockdown due to confirmed community transmission of the virus. The four-day lockdown which was under its alert level 3 became effective from 3:00 p.m. A 24-hour curfew was also in effect with all non-essential services closed. Exceptions were made for those who were going to buy essential foods. On 28 January, the government extended its lockdown for another week as cases rose rapidly in the community. Government officials also tested positive for the virus and worked remotely. On 31 January, Kiribati reported a total of 364 cases (324 in the community, 42 imported cases). In response, the Kiribati Government extended its state of disaster by another month and also extended the curfew in Betio, South Tarawa, and Buota for another seven days in order to contain the spread of COVID-19.

On 1 February, Kiribati reported 169 new cases, bringing the total number to 629. By 22 July, total number of cases in Kiribati was 3,430, with 2,730 recoveries and 13 deaths.

Having been closed again because of this outbreak, the border re-opened and restricted flights resumed into Tarawa in June 2022. Scheduled commercial flights were resumed a few weeks later.

== Vaccination ==
As of 21 May 2021, Kiribati was one of last countries to have not started a vaccination campaign. Support from Australia was under discussions for access to vaccines. Kiribati was an eligible country for COVAX program, and was expected to receive 48,000 doses of AstraZeneca vaccine. On 25 May 2021, Kiribati received its first 24,000 doses of AstraZeneca vaccine via COVAX.

== Statistics ==
=== Cases by Islands ===
Island	Cases	Deaths	References
Abaiang	4	0	
Abemama	18	0	
Aranuka	11	0	
Beru	10	0	
Butaritari	134	0	
Maiana	25	0	
Makin	9	0	
Marakei	5	0	
Nonouti	62	0	
Onotoa	16	0	
Tabiteuea	65	0	
Tarawa (Note: 2,763 positive cases on South Tarawa, Betio and Buota and 49 cases on North Tarawa (without Buota).) (Note: Includes 45 imported cases in managed quarantine on South Tarawa and Betio.)	2,857	3	
Total	3,252 (Note: 18 recorded in Abaiang and North Tarawa indistinctly.)	13	

== See also ==
- COVID-19 pandemic in Oceania
