= Music of Kiribati =

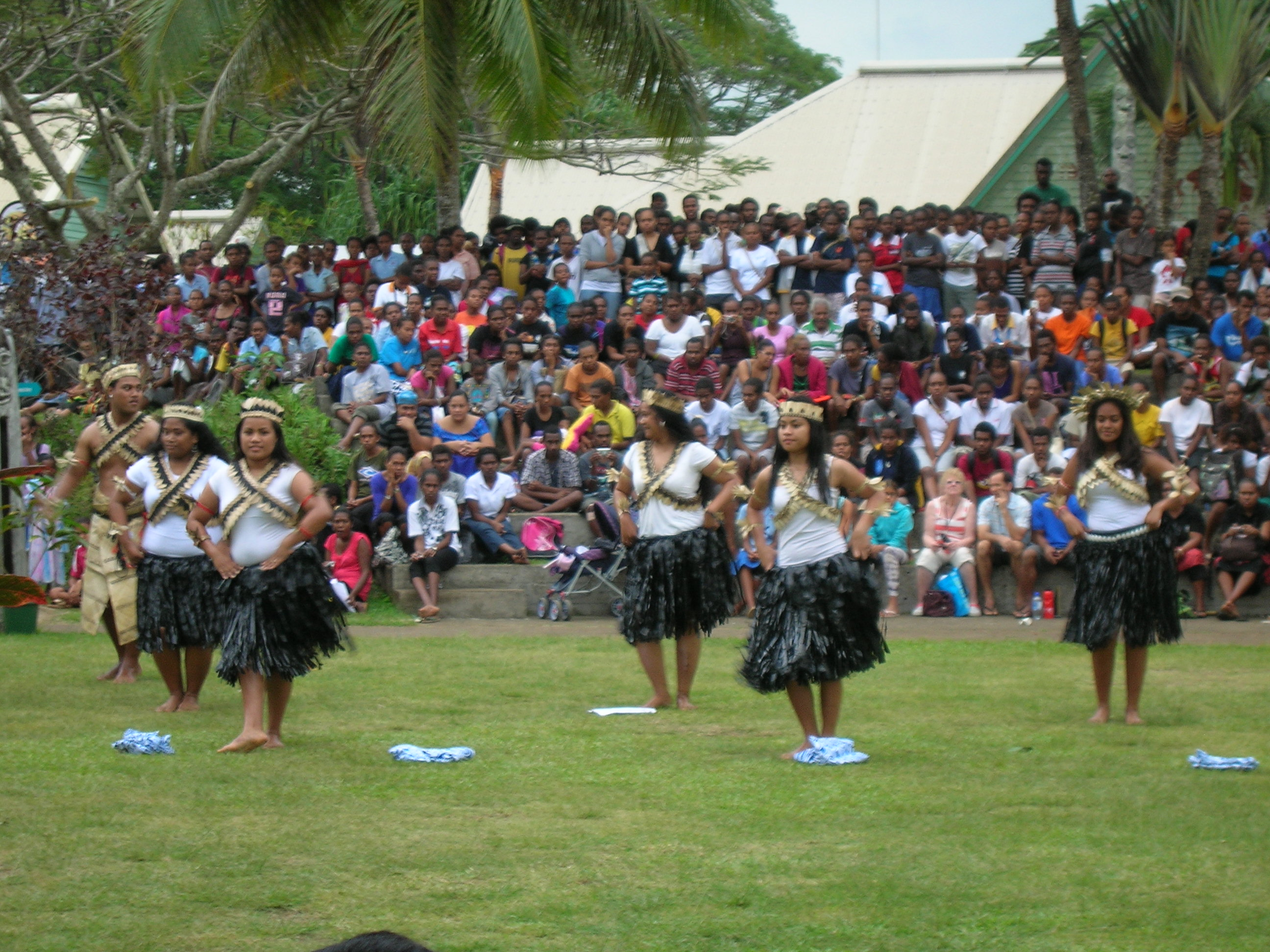
Kiribati dancers

The music of Kiribati has been less affected by Western culture than most other Pacific island cultures since Europeans did not arrive in Kiribati until 1892. The national anthem of Kiribati is "Kunan Kiribati" (Song of Kiribati), by I.T. Uriam; it was adopted upon independence in 1979.

Kiribati folk music is generally based on chanting or other forms of vocalizing, accompanied by body percussion. Public performances in modern Kiribati are generally performed by a seated chorus, accompanied by a guitar. However, during formal performances of the standing dance (Te Kaimatoa) or the hip dance (Te Buki) a wooden box is used as a percussion instrument. This box is constructed so as to give a hollow and reverberating tone when struck simultaneously by a chorus of men sitting around it. Traditional songs are often love-themed, but there are also competitive, religious, children's, patriotic, war and wedding songs. There are also stick dances (which accompany legends and semi-historical stories. These stick dances or 'tirere' (pronounced seerere) are only performed during major festivals.

In 1963 Gerd Koch filmed on Tabiteuea traditional dances and songs of the ruoia series: the kawawa, the introductory song and dance; the kamei with a dance leader, the wan tarawa and the kabuakaka; and a bino song and dance complete with accompanying arm movements. Koch also filmed traditions songs and dances on Onotoa and Nonouti.

Bata Teinamati has been described as one of Kiribati's most notable musicians.

== Folk song composition ==
Its traditional music is composed by people known as te kainikamaen. These composers are said to receive their songs from myth or magic, an ability that is said to pass from father to son. After composition, a group called rurubene sings the song to the composer, after which it is made public and is sung by anyone; at this point, the song is considered blessed (mamiraki).

Composers also write songs on demand, telling a story told to him by an individual. The composer will then sing it and teach it to the rurubene, making any needed changes. Composers also occasionally create songs of their own accord.

Nowadays, not all music in Kiribati is composed by people known as te kainikamaen because of civilization and because of the introduction of western music, rather almost anyone can compose a song and sing it but he/she needs to count is as a song from a poem not from myth or magic otherwise there may be curses as part of the Kiribati Beliefs. Curses include: losing of hair and sudden death.
