= Teuea Toatu =

I-Kiribati politician (1960 or 1961–2026)

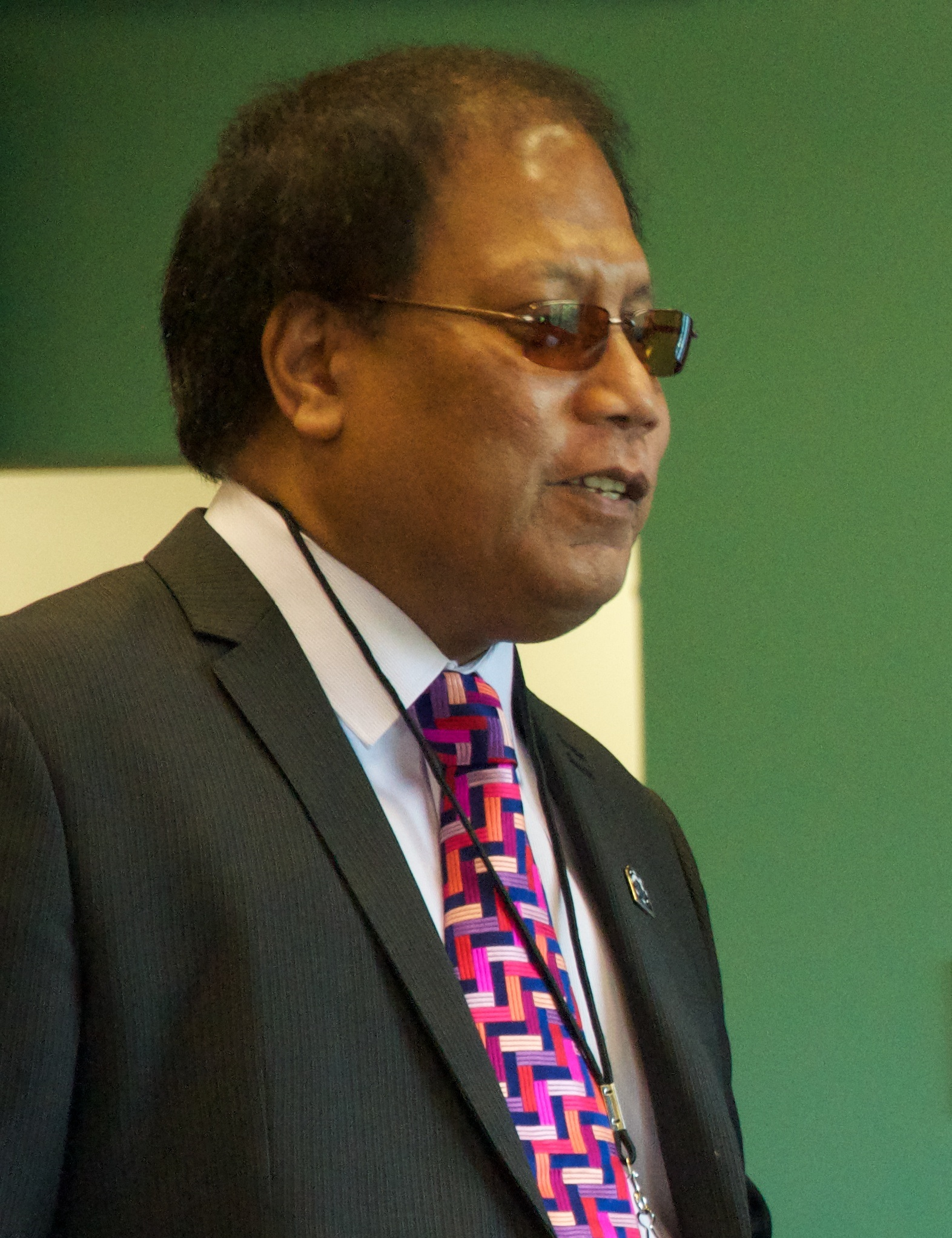
- Toatu in 2011

Vice President of Kiribati
- In office 19 June 2019 – 15 November 2026
- President: Taneti Maamau
- Preceded by: Kourabi Nenem

Minister for Finance and Economic Development
- In office 15 March 2016 – 15 November 2026
- Preceded by: Tom Murdoch

Member of the House of Assembly
- In office 7 January 2016 – 15 November 2026
- Constituency: Abaiang

Personal details
- Born: 1960 or 1961
- Died: 15 November 2026 (aged 65) Nawerewere, Kiribati
- Education: University of the South Pacific (BA); University of East Anglia; University of Strathclyde (MS)

Teuea Toatu (1960 or 1961 – 15 November 2026) was an I-Kiribati politician who was the Vice President of Kiribati from 2019 until his death in 2026, as well as a member of the House of Assembly and Minister for Finance and Economic Development from 2016 to 2026. Prior to his tenure in the assembly, he worked in the Ministry of Finance and Economic Development and in other economic positions in Kiribati.

== Early life and education ==
Teuea Toatu graduated from the University of the South Pacific with a bachelor of arts degree in accounting and economics in 1980, the University of East Anglia with a certificate in computing in 1984, and the University of Strathclyde with a master of science degree in finance in 1987. He graduated with a doctorate from the Australian National University in 2001.

== Career ==
=== Public service career ===
Toatu first worked for the government of Kiribati as a principal auditor. From 1988 to 1991, Toatu was Deputy Secretary in the Ministry of Finance and Economic Development. He was chair of the board of directors of the Kiribati National Provident Fund and deputy chair of the board of directors of the Development Bank of Kiribati. In 1991, he became a programme coordinator for the South Pacific Applied Geoscience Commission.

=== Political career ===
In the 2016 election Toatu won a seat in the House of Assembly representing Abaiang. President Taneti Maamau appointed Toatu as Minister of Finance and Economic Development in 2016.

Vice President Kourabi Nenem was dismissed from office by Maamau for violating the government's travel policy by taking an unsanctioned trip to Indonesia. Toatu was appointed to replace Nenem as Vice-President of Kiribati on 19 June 2019, and retained his position as Minister of Finance and Economic Development.

In January 2026, Toatu and New Zealand Foreign Minister Winston Peters signed a statement in Tarawa renewing New Zealand's aid assistance to Kiribati in the areas of health, labour mobility, and security.

=== Board memberships and positions ===
Toatu was Kiribati's national designated authority person for the Green Climate Fund (GCF) and the Adaptation Fund and focal person for the Climate Investment Funds and the Vulnerable Twenty Group. He was Kiribati's national authorizing officer for the European Development Fund.

Toatu joined the board of the GCF as an alternate member for small island developing states before becoming a full member in January 2025. He was the Governor for Kiribati in the Asian Development Bank, the IMF and the World Bank.

== Personal life and death ==
Toatu was married to Brucetta, with whom he had 9 children.

Toatu was recovering from cancer when his condition suddenly became worse and he died at Tungaru Central Hospital in Nawerewere on 15 November 2026, at the age of 65. His death was announced by Ruth Cross Kwansing on the same day.

== Bibliography ==
- Toatu, Teuea (1993). "The Revenue Equalisation Reserve Fund". In Van Trease, Howard (ed.). Atoll politics: the republic of Kiribati. Christchurch: Macmillan Brown Centre for Pacific Studies. pp. 183–189. ISBN 978-0-9583300-0-8.
- Toatu, Teuea (2001). "Unravelling the Pacific Paradox – the case of Kiribati". Pacific Economic Bulletin. 16 (1): 109–122. hdl:1885/157619. ISSN 1834-9455.
- Toatu, Teuea (2002). Analyzing the growth performance of the Pacific island countries : the institutional approach (Thesis). doi:10.25911/5D5FCFAD6350D. hdl:1885/150311. S2CID 210096099.
- Toatu, Teuea (2004). "Getting the institutional environment right for investment and growth in the Pacific". Pacific Economic Bulletin. 19 (2): 75–86.
- Toatu, Teuea (2004). "Keeping the Nauru economy afloat" (PDF). Pacific Economic Bulletin. 19 (2): 123–128.
- Rotjan, Randi; Jamieson, Regen; Carr, Ben; Kaufman, Les; Mangubhai, Sangeeta; Obura, David; Pierce, Ray; Rimon, Betarim; Ris, Bud; Toatu, Teuea (2014). "Establishment, Management, and Maintenance of the Phoenix Islands Protected Area". Advances in Marine Biology. Elsevier: 289–324. doi:10.1016/B978-0-12-800214-8.00008-6. ISBN 978-0-12-800214-8.

== Works cited ==
=== Books ===
- Van Trease, Howard (1993). Atoll Politics: The Republic of Kiribati. University of the South Pacific. ISBN 9780958330008.

=== News ===
- "Kiribati names Toatu as new vice president". Radio New Zealand. 20 June 2019. Archived from the original on 5 July 2025.
- "Kiribati vice president Dr Teuea Toatu dies". Radio New Zealand. 16 November 2026. Archived from the original on 16 November 2026.
- "More Kiribati ministers lose seats". Radio New Zealand. 8 January 2019. Archived from the original on 5 July 2025.
- "New Kiribati cabinet ministers sworn in". Radio New Zealand. 16 March 2016. Archived from the original on 5 July 2025.
- "EU and the Republic of Kiribati Sign 3.7 Million Euro Energy Project". European External Action Service. 20 September 2016. Archived from the original on 26 February 2025.
- "New Zealand and Kiribati sign statement of partnership agreement". Radio New Zealand. 19 January 2026. Archived from the original on 16 November 2026.
- "Tributes flow from across the region for Kiribati's late vice president". Radio New Zealand. 19 November 2026. Archived from the original on 18 November 2026.
- ""We Love You Dad"". Radio Kiribati. 17 November 2026. Archived from the original on 19 November 2026.
- "In memoriam: Dr Teuea Toatu". Green Climate Fund. 16 November 2026. Archived from the original on 17 November 2026.

=== Web ===
- "Kiribati". The World Factbook. Archived from the original on 5 July 2025.
- "newsletterQ1.pdf" (PDF). Kiribati Climate Finance Newsletter. Archived (PDF) from the original on 15 April 2026.
- "Board of Governors". Asian Development Bank. Archived from the original on 30 October 2026.
- "Kiribati". The Vulnerable Twenty Group. Archived from the original on 13 September 2025.
- "GS2022-cover15-Kiribati-final.pdf" (PDF). IMF Connect. Archived (PDF) from the original on 26 June 2024.
