= Naval Base Tarawa =

Former Naval base of the United States

- Map of Tarawa Atoll; Bases were on Betio and Bonriki; United States Navy (1943-1944)

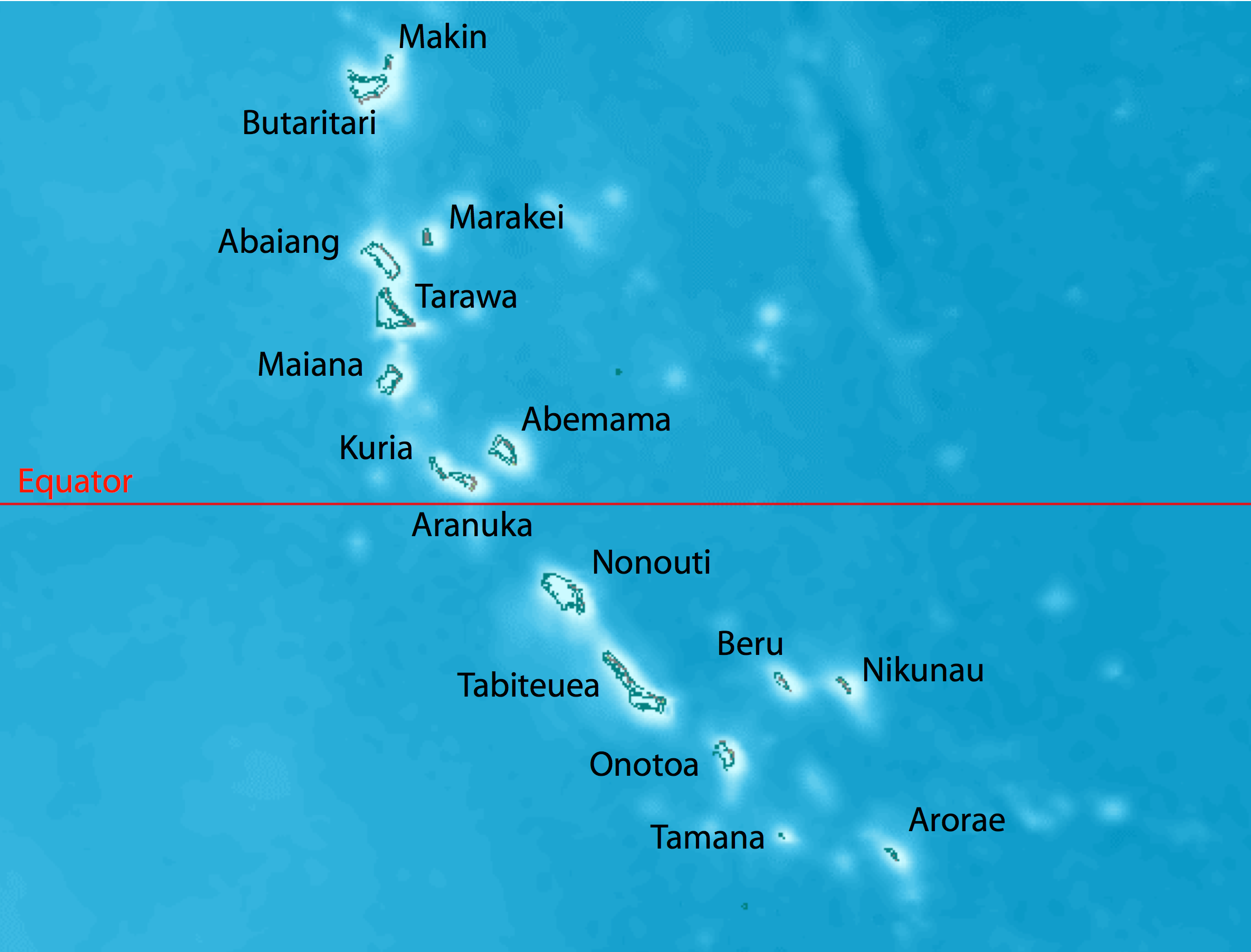
- Map of the Gilbert Islands

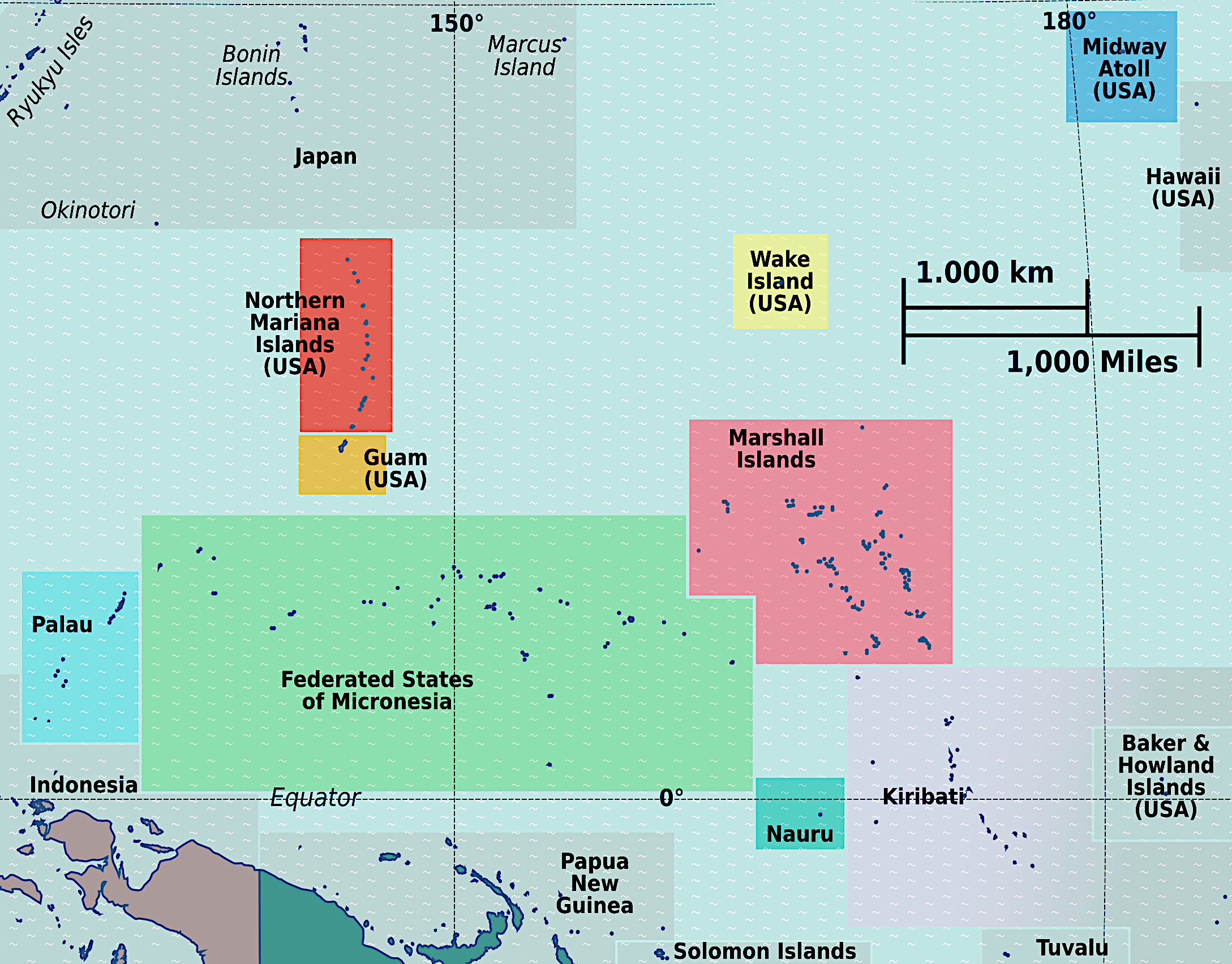
- Naval Base Tarawa Naval Base Tarawa (Micronesia) Naval Base Tarawa (Oceania) Naval Base Tarawa (Pacific Ocean)

Geography
- Location: Pacific Ocean
- Coordinates: 1°20′N 173°00′E
- Archipelago: Gilbert Islands

Additional information
- Time zone: UTC+12:00

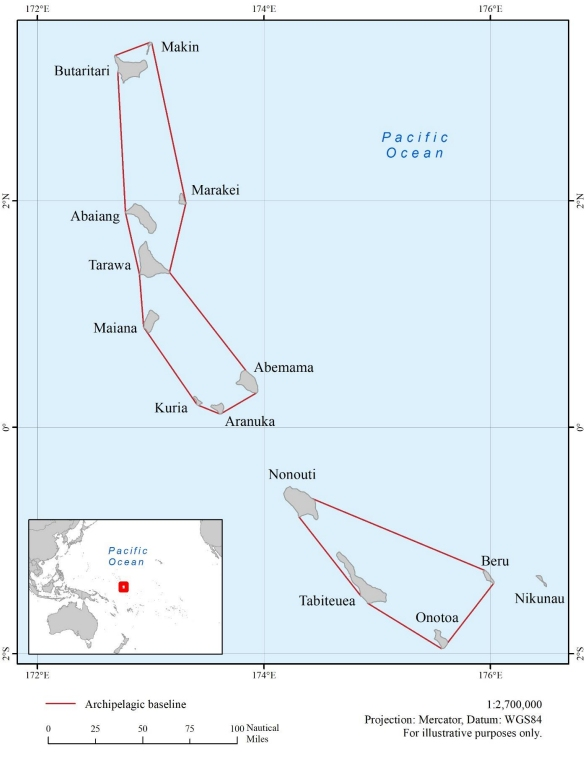
Map of Gilbert Islands, with Tarawa

Naval Base Tarawa was a naval base built by the United States Navy in 1943 to support the World War II effort. The base was located on Tarawa atoll in the Gilbert Islands in the Central Pacific Ocean. The base was built as one of many advance bases in the island-hopping campaign towards the Empire of Japan. At Naval Base Tarawa the Navy built a seaport, seaplane base and two airbases. Construction started after the Battle of Tarawa ended November 23, 1943, part of Operation Galvanic.

== History ==
To support the Battle of Tarawa a US Navy fast carrier strike group was founded. The strike group flag ships were the USS Yorktown and USS Essex. New to the strike group was stationing US submarines around Tarawa to rescue downed aircrew quickly. A second fast carrier strike group supported the battle. The strike group flag ships were the: USS Lexington and USS Princeton and USS Belleau Wood. From Naval Base Funafuti the US Navy sent 24 Consolidated PBY Catalina and PV-1 Lockheed Ventura planes to support operations. The USS Pursuit operated at the command ship during the invasion. The sub USS Nautilus (SS-168) did photo-reconnaissance before the invasion. Japanese submarine I-35 was sunk off Tarawa on November 23, 1943 by US destroyers. The Navy's staging for the operation was at Naval Base Wellington departing November 1, 1943.

After the taking of Tarawa on November 27, US Navy Seabees built pontoon barge. The pontoon barge was used to bring the 98th Seabee Naval Construction Battalion equipment and gear ashore. The Seabee built a causeway dock so small boats and barges could unload supplies. The island did not have quality port. The first project was clearing and repairing the captured runways on the island. The 29th Seabee Naval Construction Battalion joined the project. The Seabee built a 1,900-foot by 32-foot wharf for the unloading of cargo ships. The island and the cargo ship had no timber for the pier piling. The Seabees were able to repurpose the train track rails, from a Japanese narrow-gauge railroad. The tug USS Tawasa and USS Arapaho (ATF-68) often worked at the port, as did the tanker USS Maquoketa (AOG-51).

A temporary Seabee camp was built on the beach, lagoon side of Betio, and later a more permanent camp was built after the completion of the airstrip. On December 4, another Seabee group arrived to help with construction. On December 18 the 4,000-foot fighter runway was completed. The runway was paved with 10-inches of compacted crushed coral, mined from the atoll lagoon. Next, the bomber runway was completed, 7,050 feet long and 200 feet wide.

A camp for 1,300 Seabees that operated the air base was built at the airfield. Seabees built a 100-bed quonset hut hospital, control tower, an 500,000-gallon aviation-gasoline tank farm. Just outside the camp built a ammunition and bomb storage site. The US Navy hospital ship USS Solace supported the battle, later the USS Relief (AH-1) supported the base in January 1944.

The 74th Seabee Naval Construction Battalion landed on 285-acre Betio Island Island to repair and improve the runway where. A few Japanese troops were still dug in and there were a few snipers at large. No Seabees were injured, but the random air raid did some damage. Betio Island was a mess, littered with war damage and debris. Seabee cleared out the Island and started work on the runway repair. Betio had no docks, gear was put on barges and dragged to shore over tidal flats and reefs. A fighter plane runway was built 4,400 feet long and 150 feet wide paved with coral concrete. The runway supported six medium bombers and US Navy patrol operations. A coral quarry was operated for the runway, road, and other uses. The 74th Seabee Naval Construction Battalion departed on March 1, 1944.

Both islands had very limited fresh water, so Seabees installed a evaporator water supply, outputting daily capacity of 20,000 gallons. Mess halls, housing, storage depot, power station, and refrigeration storage was all built by the Seabees. A camp for United States Marine Corps stationed was also built. In the lagoon the US Navy founded a Seaplane base with seaplane tender USS Curtiss (AV-4), PBY Catalina and Martin PBM Mariner. The US Navy Fleet Post Office was 808 SF Tarawa, Gilbert Islands. The USS Elder (AN-20) operating as net tender laid nets to protect the lagoon.

United States Army Air Forces 41st Bombardment Group operated North American B-25 Mitchell out of Betio and Bonriki. Later Consolidated B-24 Liberator also operated from Betio and Bonriki. Bases were built on two other Gilbert Islands: Naval Base Abemama and Makin Island

  - US Navy stationed at Tarawa:
- VF-13 with PBY Catalina
- VP-202 with Martin PBM Mariner
- USS Curtiss (AV-4) to support PBY and PBM
- VB-142 with Lockheed Ventura PV-1
- VB-144 with Lockheed Ventura PV-1
- VB-137 with Lockheed Ventura PV-1
- VS-66 with Douglas SBD Dauntless Antisubmarine Squadron - Scouting Squadron
- CASU-16 Carrier Aircraft Service Unit
- US Navy supported Hedron 4, a United States Marine Corps unit

== Airfields ==
- On Bonriki Mullinix Field in honor of Rear Admiral Henry M. Mullinix.
- On Betio, Tarawa Airfield, called Hawkins Field in honor of USMC 1st Lt. William Dean Hawkins

== Post war ==
- U.S. Marine War Memorial at Prince Philip Park.
- Tarawa Coastwatchers Memorial, memorial plaque, In memory of 22 British subjects murdered by the Japanese at Betio on October 15, 1942.
- New Zealand Memorial to U.S. Marines and Navy

== Gallery ==
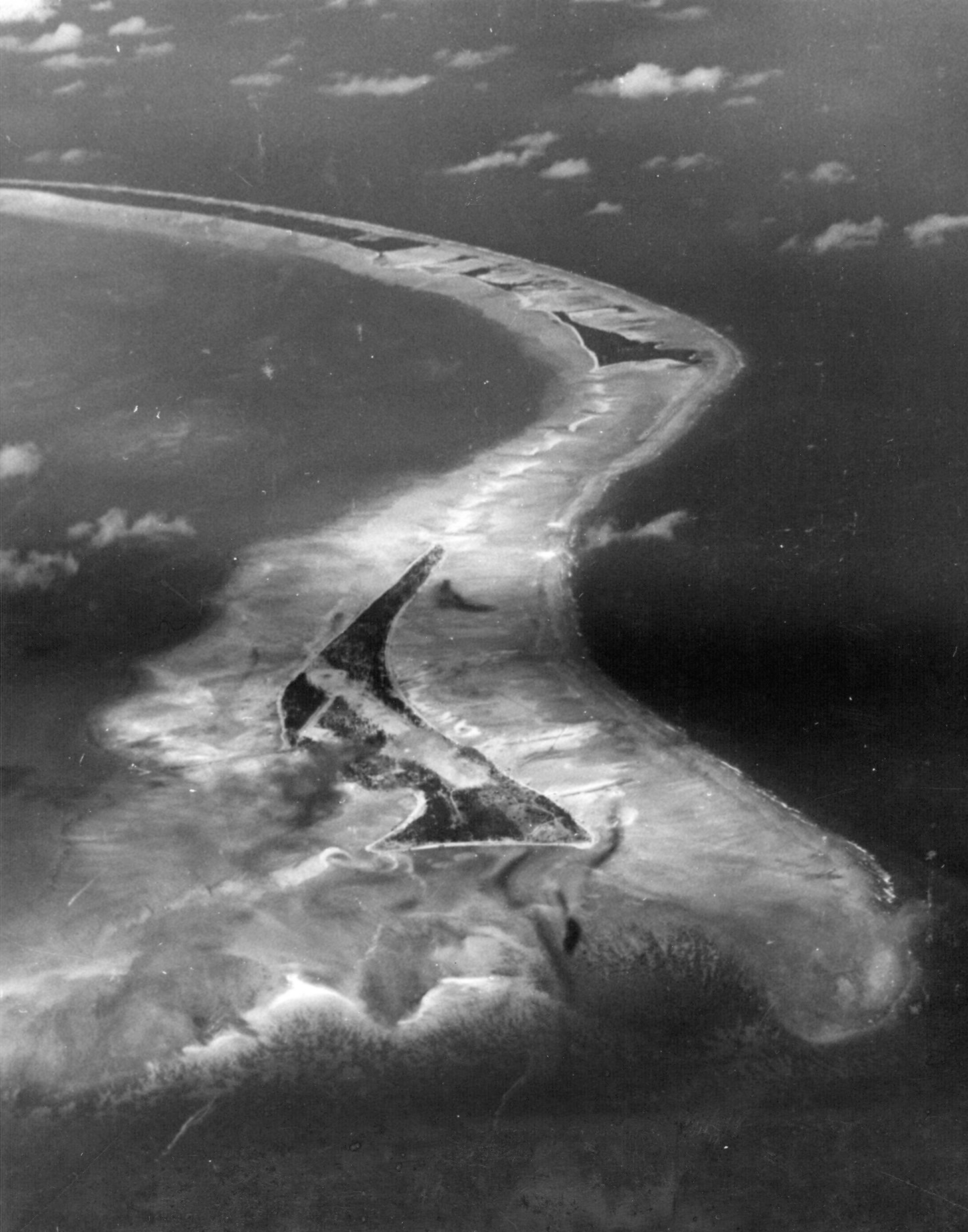
Aerial view of Betio Island, Tarawa Atoll before invasion of the island by U.S. Marines, 18 September 1943.

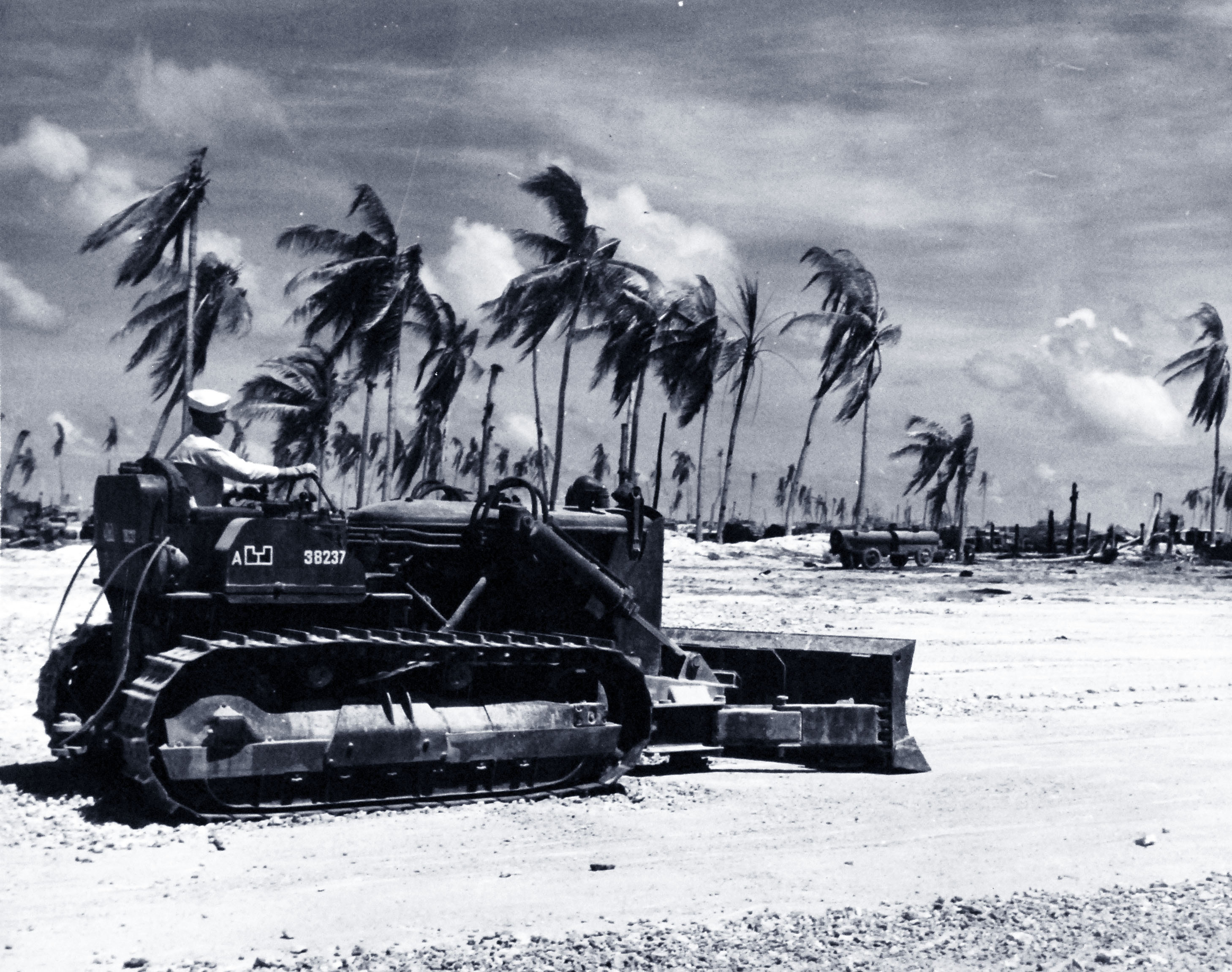
Seabee building Hawkins Field

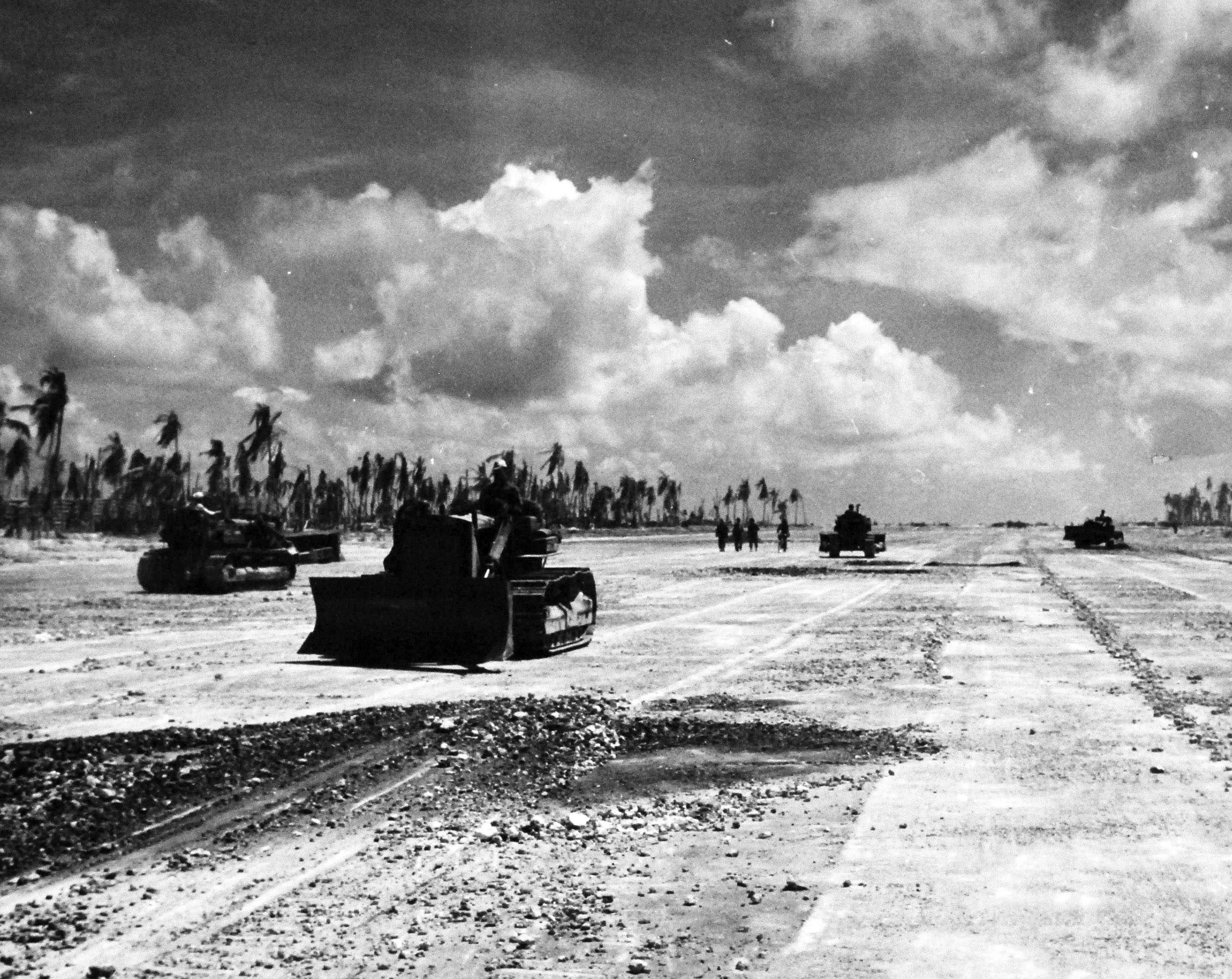
Seabee building Hawkins Field

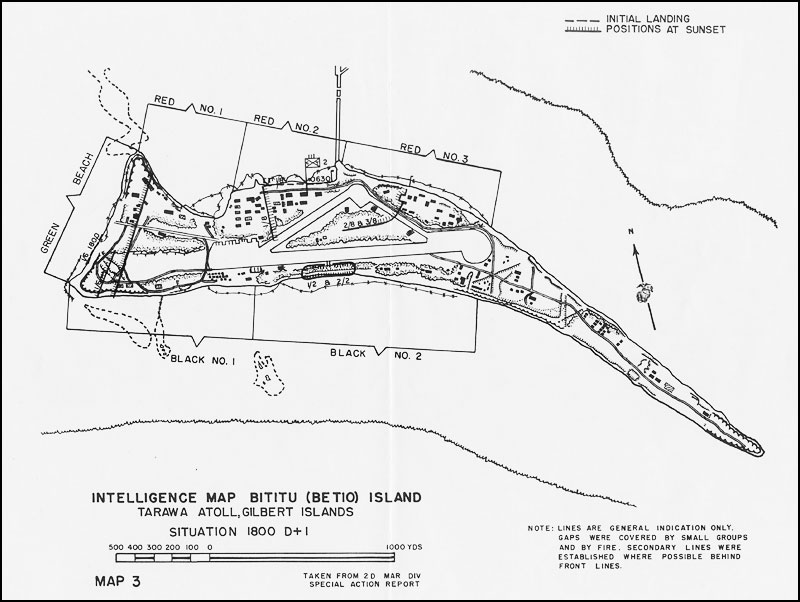
Map of runway on Betio and landing plans

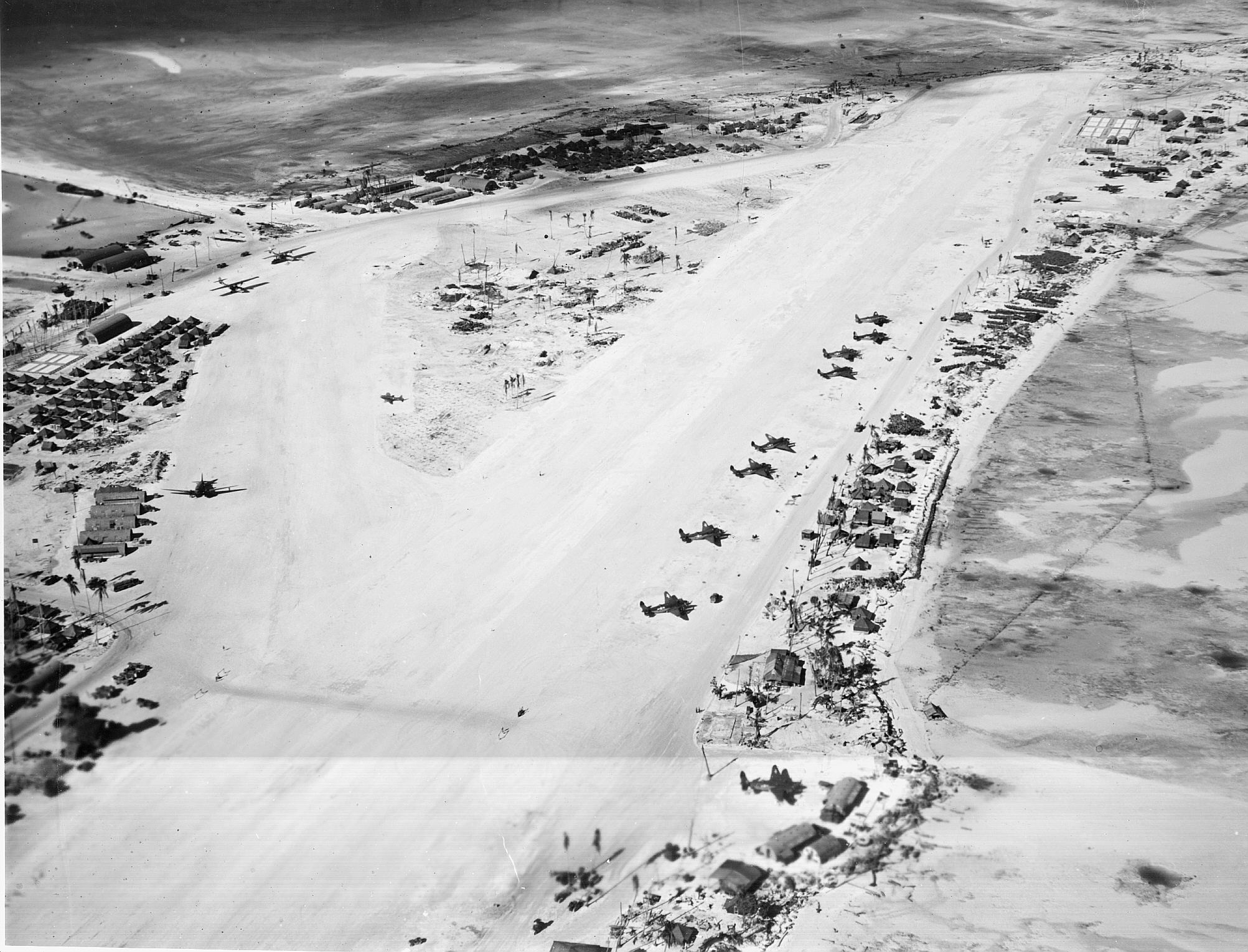
Long range aircraft at Hawkins Field (Tarawa), March 1944

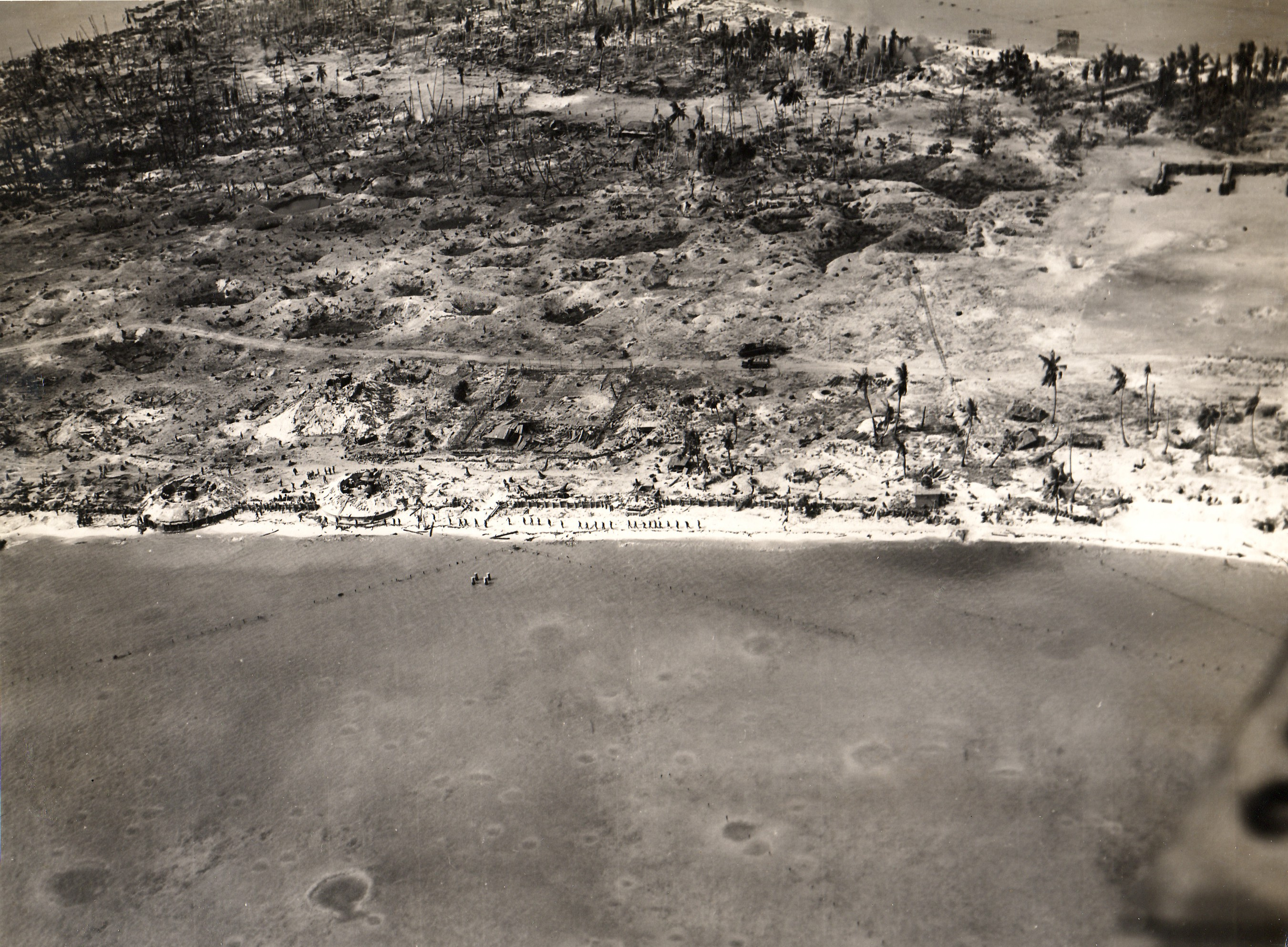
Aerial view of Betio, Tarawa Atoll, 24 November 1943, looking north toward "The Pocket", the last place of Japanese resistance. An emplacement just onshore with two 12.7 mm anti-aircraft guns is visible near the left edge of the photograph.

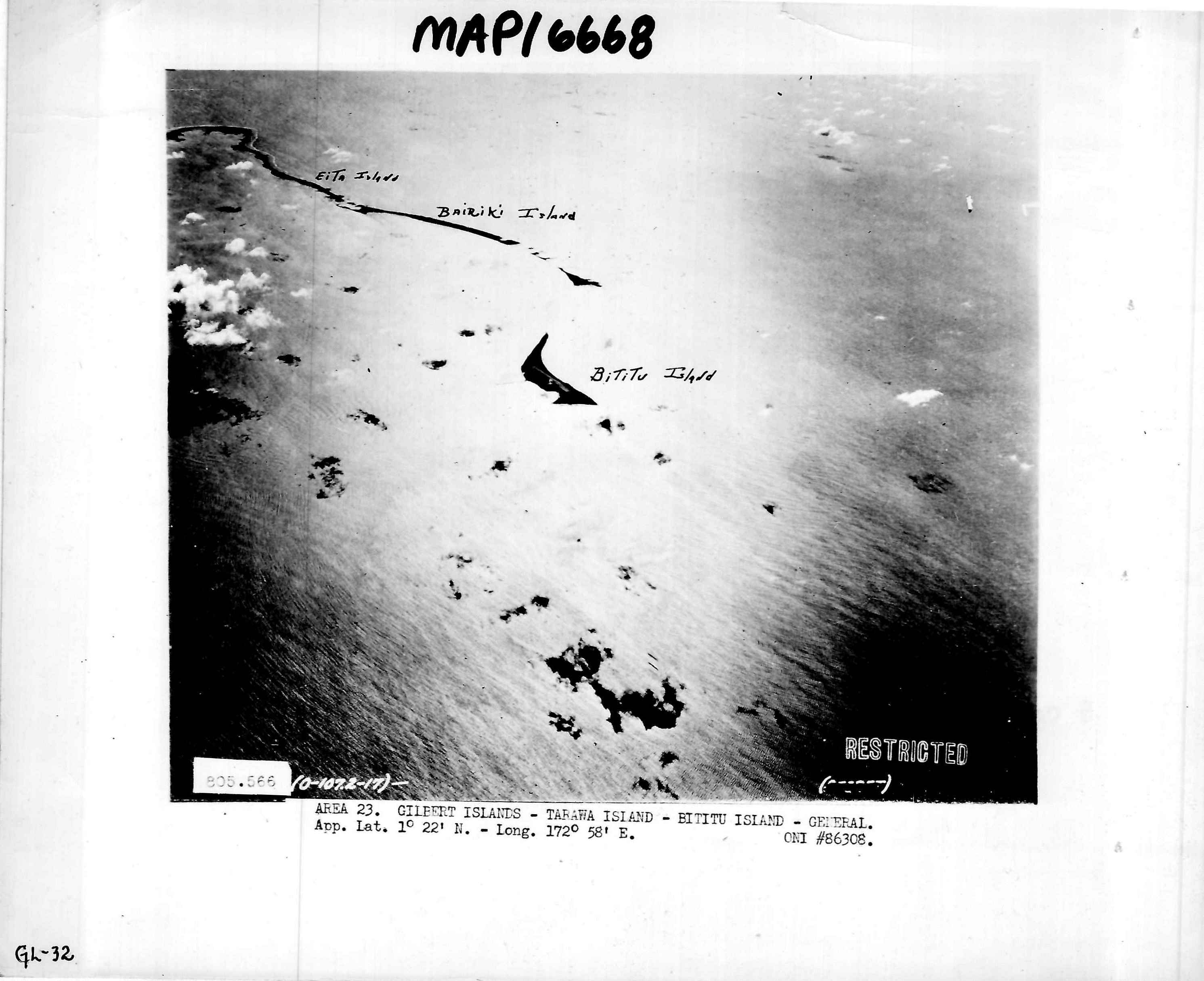
Gilbert Islands 1943

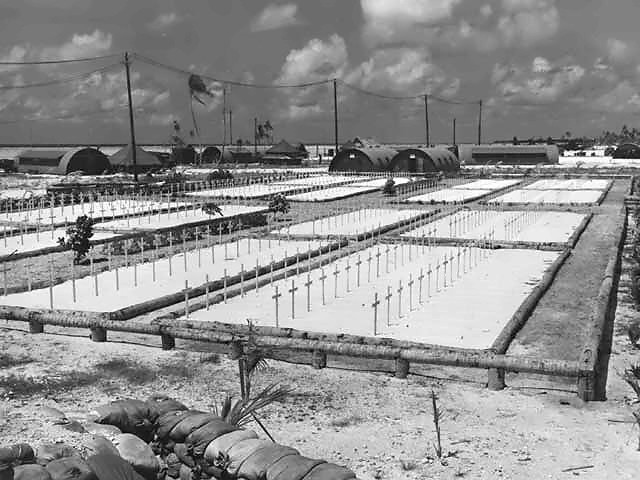
The largest of 37 cemeteries on Tarawa

== See also ==
- US Naval Advance Bases
- Battle of Tarawa order of battle
- Gilbert Islands naval order of battle
- Makin Airfield Gilbert Islands
- Naval Base Gilbert Islands
