= Hawkins Field (disambiguation) =

Hawkins Field is a baseball stadium in Nashville, Tennessee. It may also refer to:

- Hawkins Field (airport), an airport in Mississippi
- Hawkins Field (Tarawa), a former military airfield on Betio Island, Tarawa
