= Naval Base Gilbert Islands =

Former Naval bases of the United States

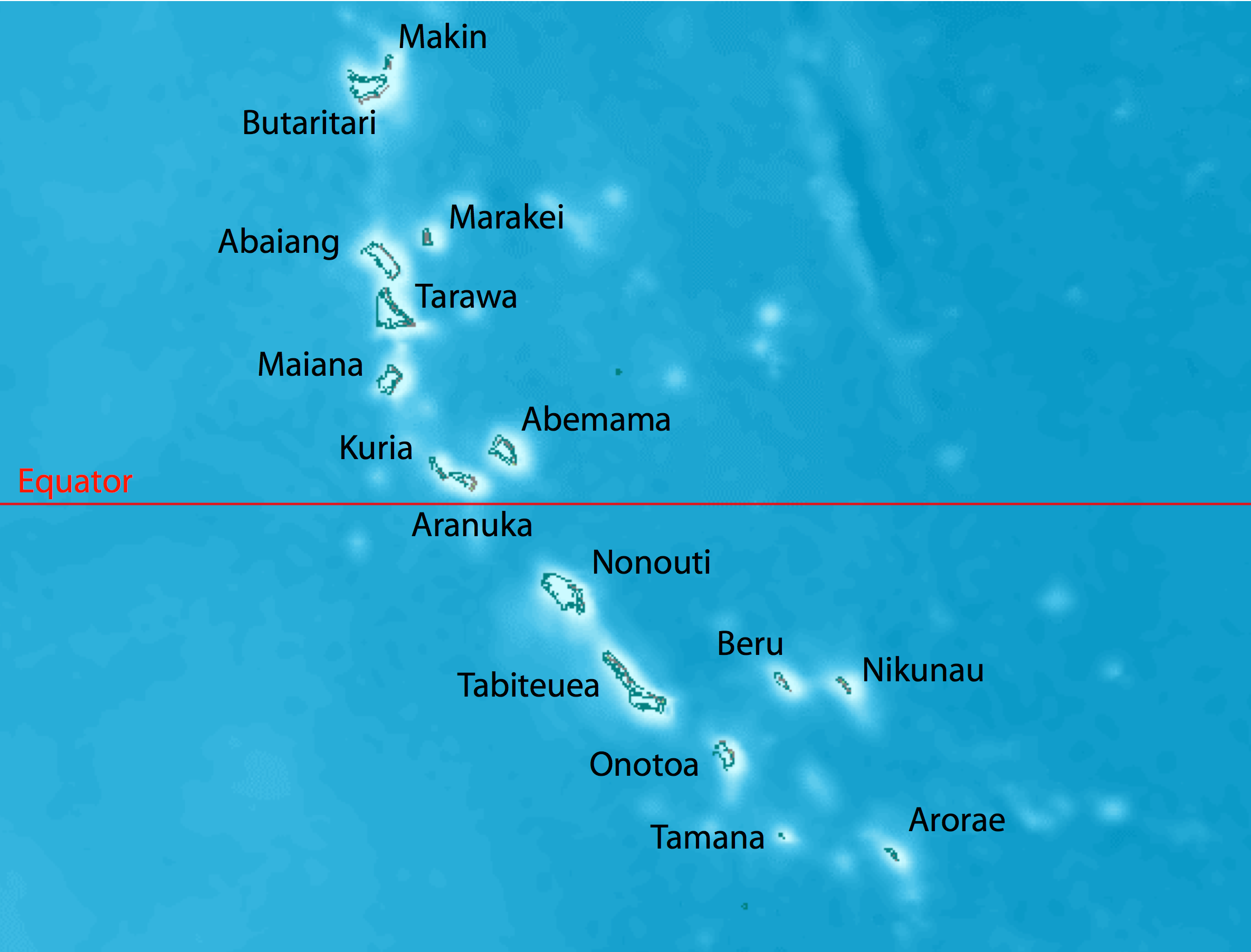
- Map of the Gilbert Islands

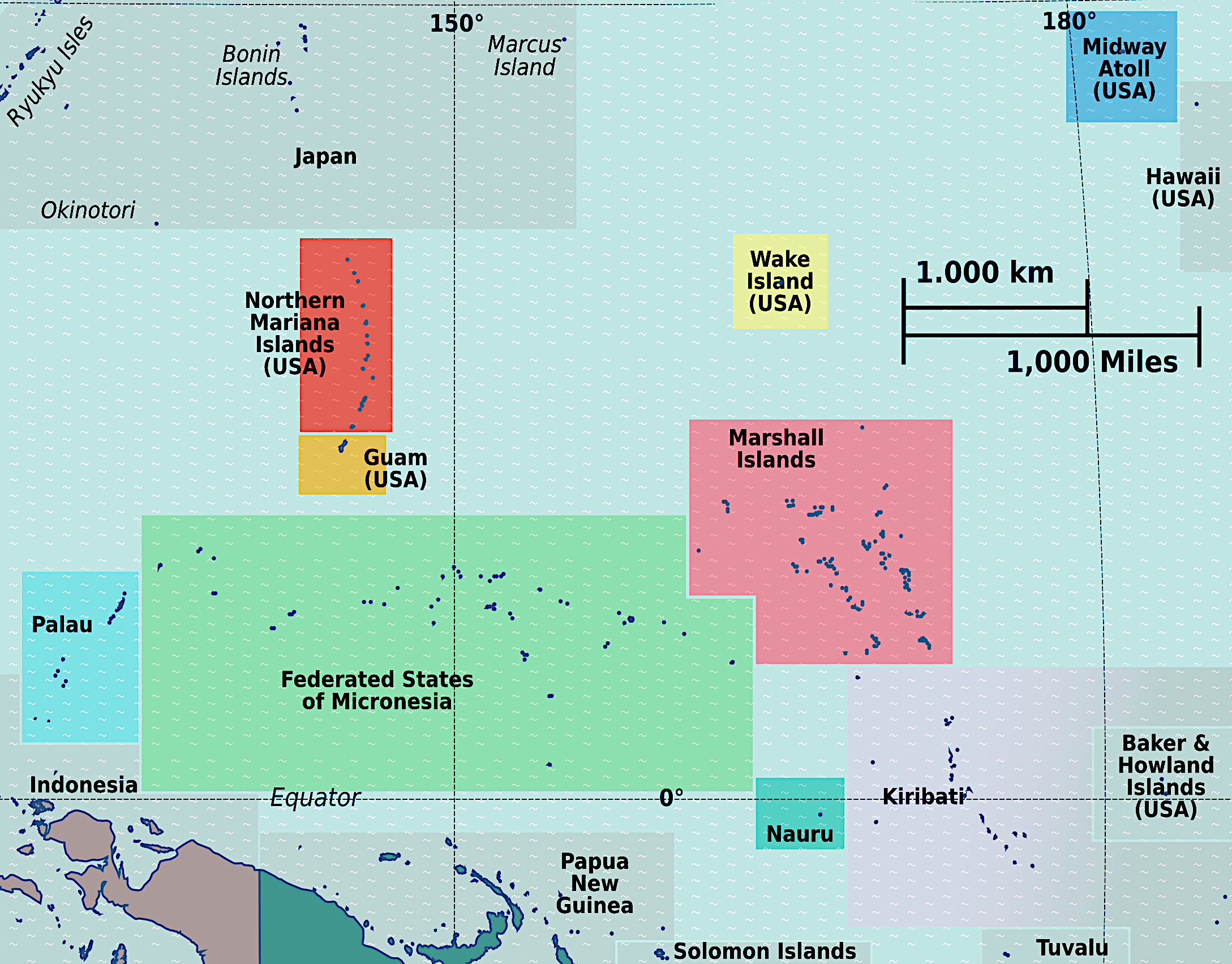
- Naval Base Gilbert Islands Naval Base Gilbert Islands (Micronesia) Naval Base Gilbert Islands (Oceania) Naval Base Gilbert Islands (Pacific Ocean)

Geography
- Location: Pacific Ocean
- Coordinates: 1°20′N 173°00′E
- Archipelago: Gilbert Islands

Additional information
- Time zone: UTC+12:00

Naval Base Gilbert Islands were naval bases built by the United States Navy in 1943 to support the World War II effort. The bases were located on in the Gilbert Islands in the Central Pacific Ocean. The bases were built as part of the many advance bases in the island-hopping campaign towards the Empire of Japan. The largest base was the Naval Base Tarawa. At Tarawa the Navy built a seaport, supply depots, a small ship repair depot, Carrier Aircraft Service Unit, seaplane base and two airbases. Construction started after the Battle of Tarawa ended on November 23, 1943, part of Operation Galvanic. The bases were built by the US Navy's Seabees, Naval Construction Battalions. After the war the bases were abandoned. Some of the airfields became civilian airports.

== Naval Base Gilbert Islands ==
- Naval Base Tarawa, a very large base.
  - Tarawa Seaplane base
    - VP-13 with Consolidated PBY Catalina
    - VP-202 with Martin PBM Mariner
  - Mullinix Field, became Bonriki International Airport
  - Hawkins Field, abandoned and after the war.
- Naval Base Abemama
  - O’Hare Field after war became Abemama Airport
- Naval Base Makin on Makin Island
  - Makin Airfield became Butaritari Airport

== Gallery ==
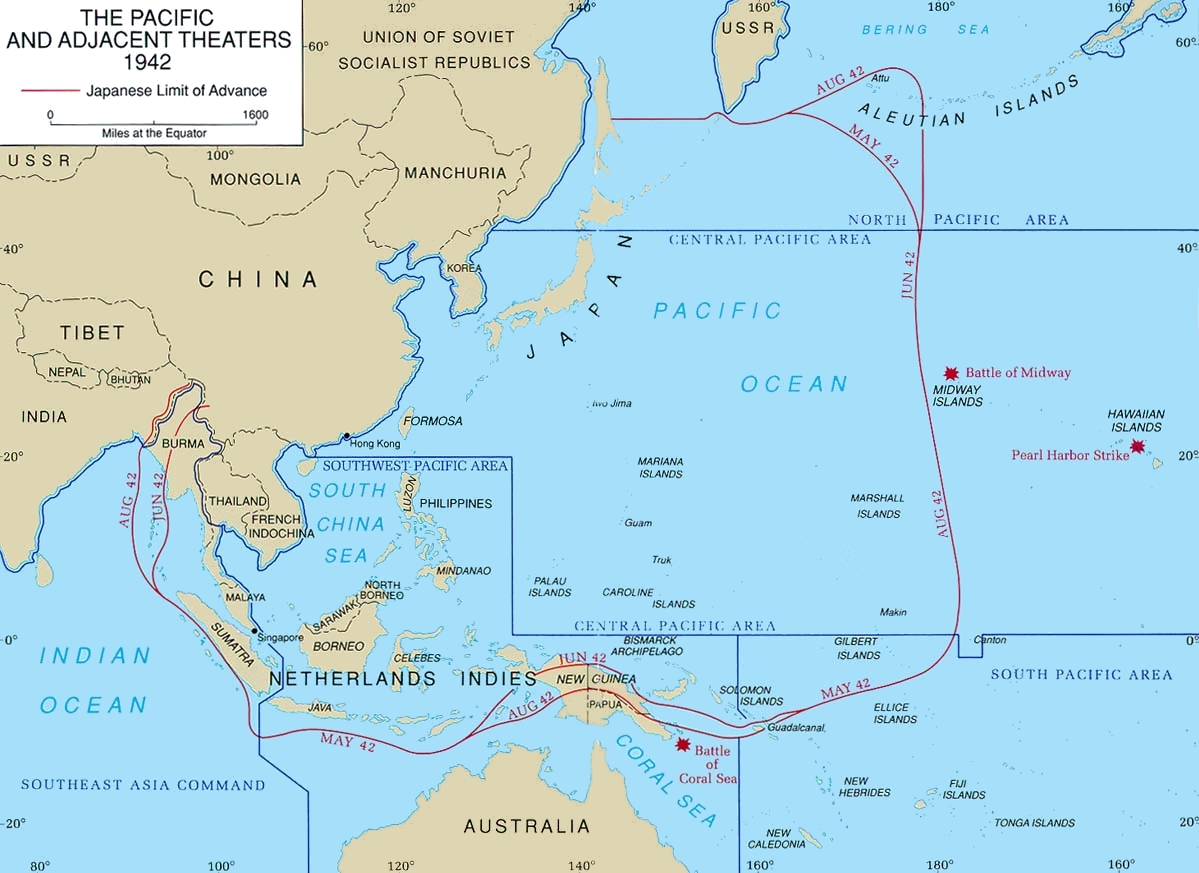
Pacific War Theater Areas map 1942

South Tarawa, Tarawa Atoll

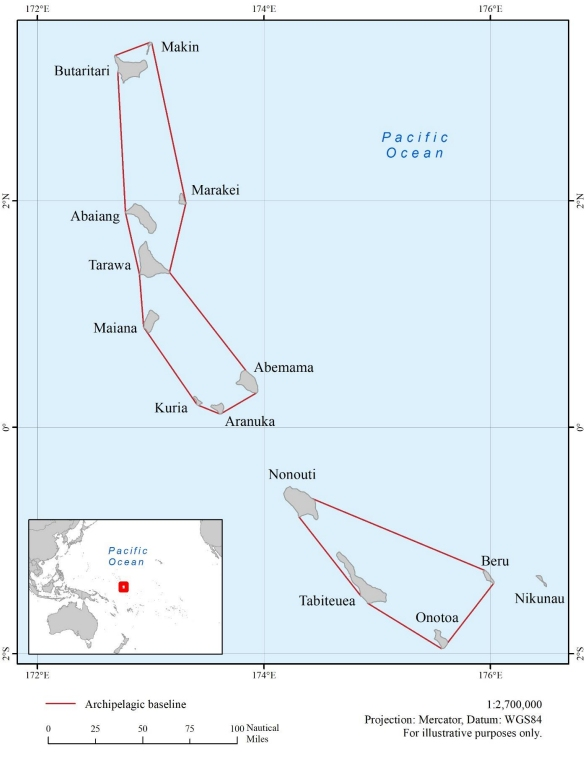
Map Gilbert Group of Islands

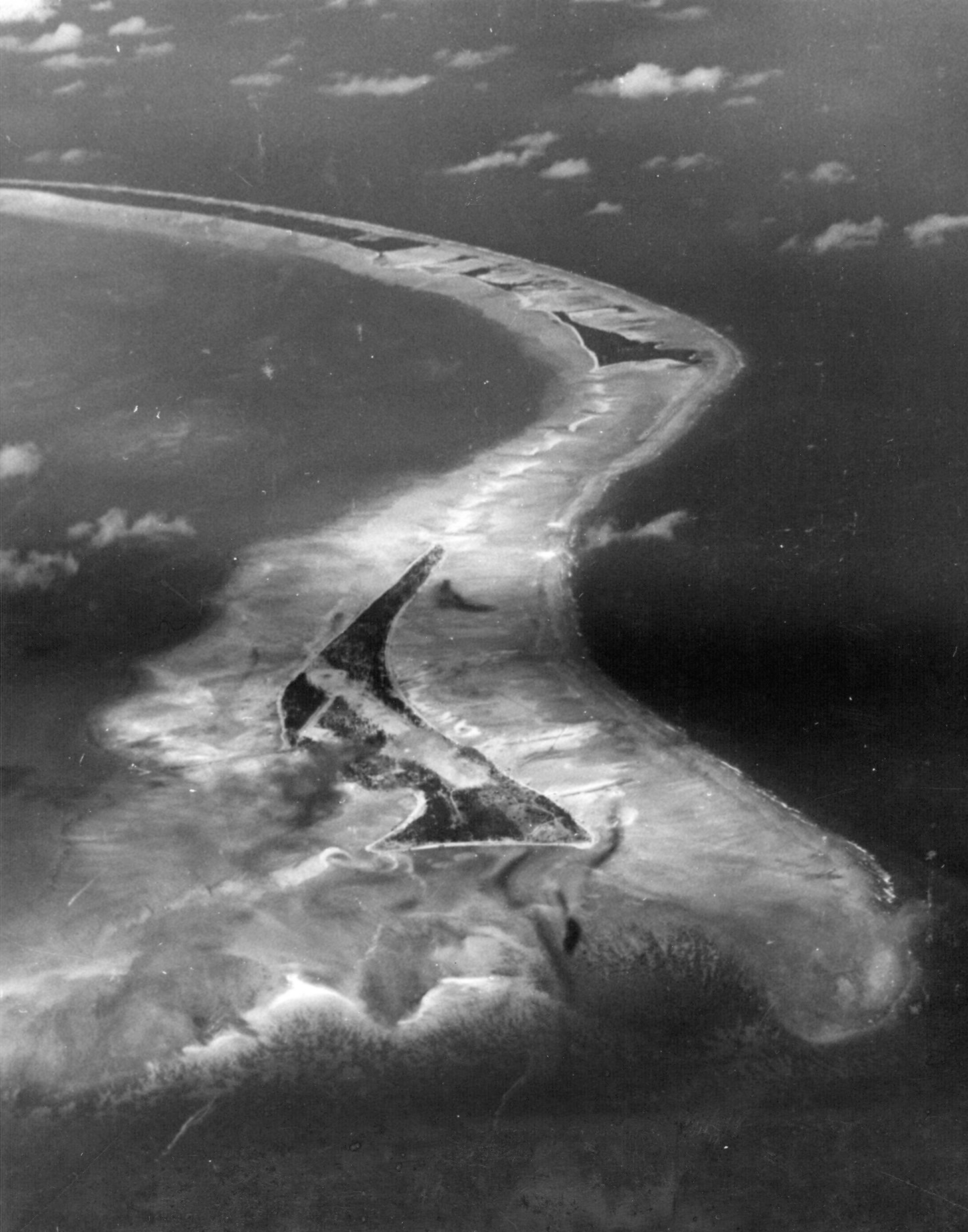
Aerial view of Betio Island, Tarawa Atoll before invasion of the island by U.S. Marines, 18 September 1943.

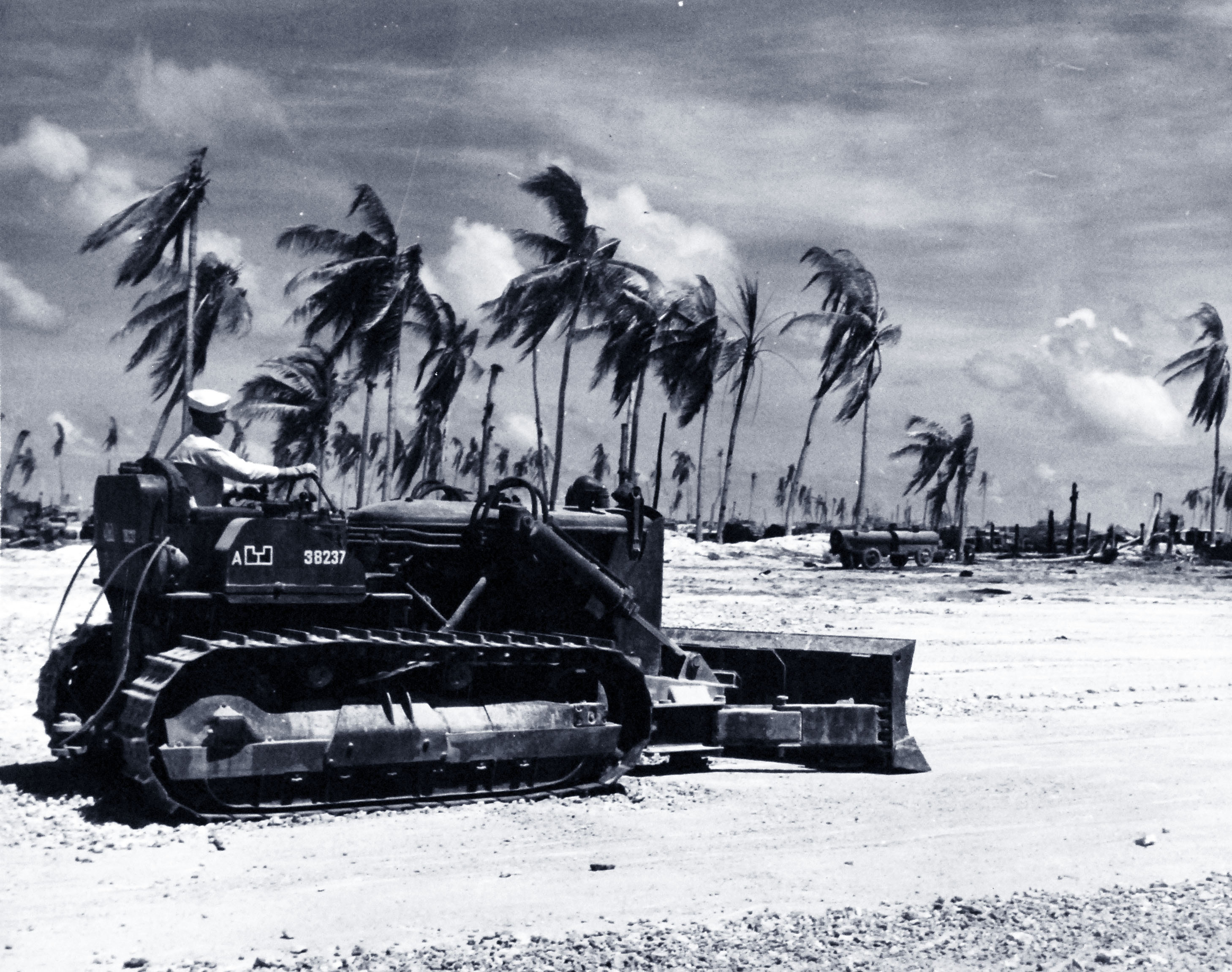
Seabee building Hawkins Field

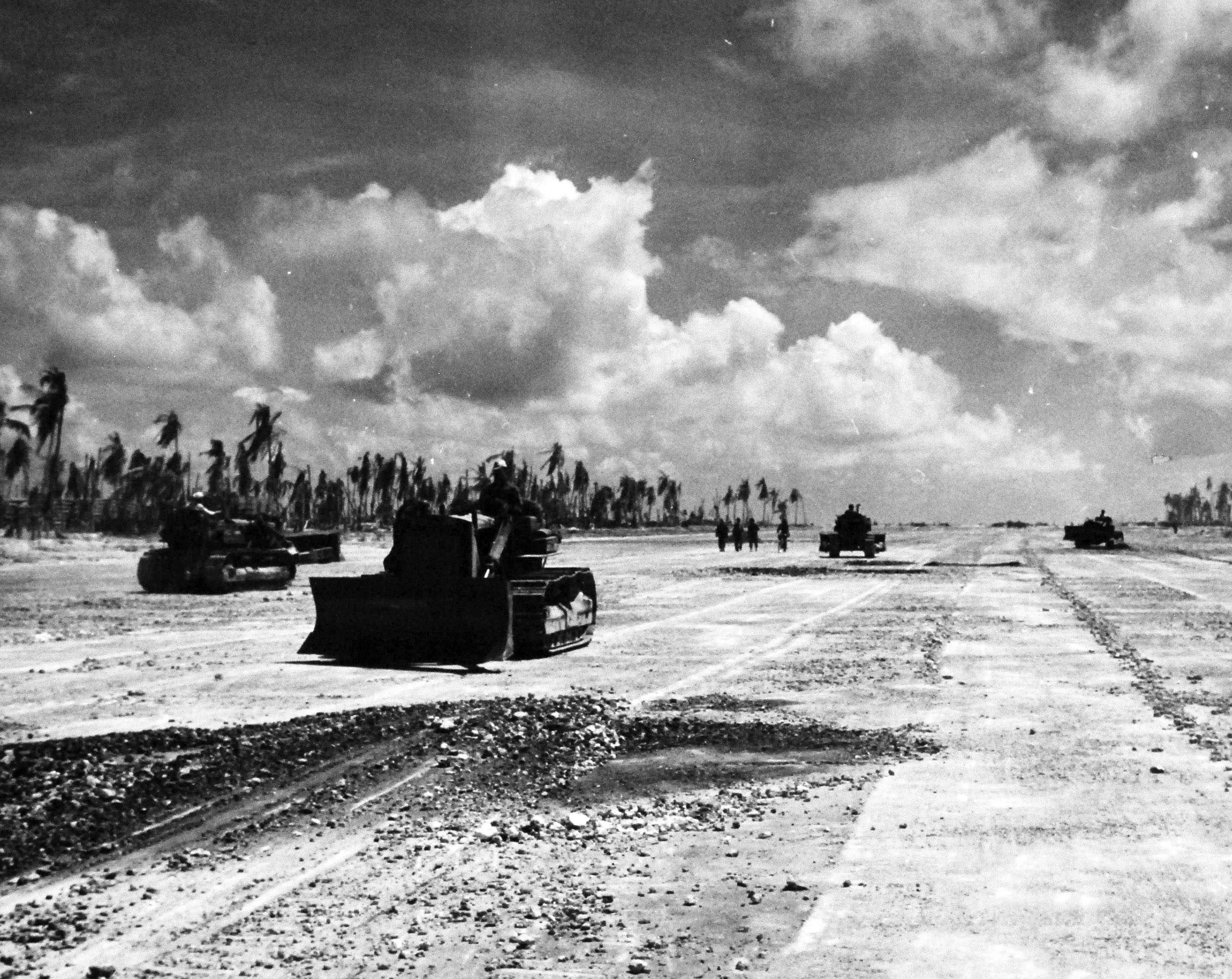
Seabee building Hawkins Field

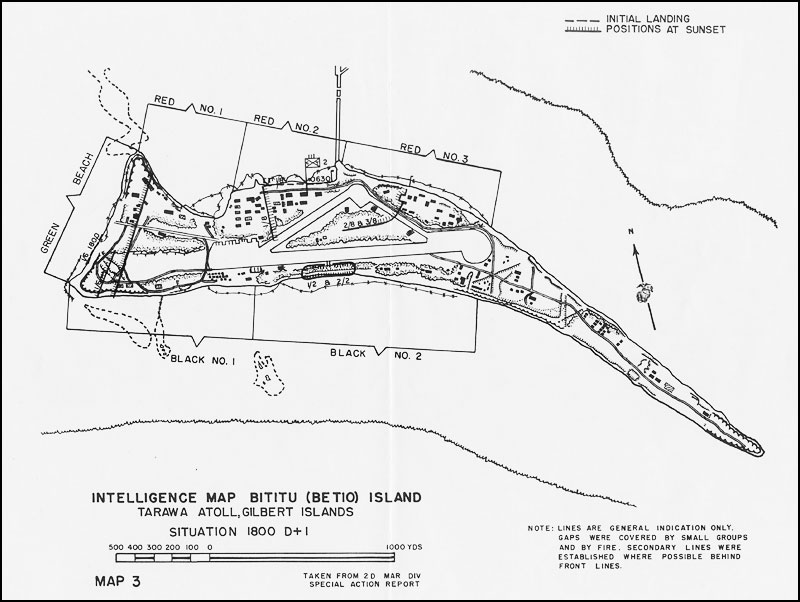
Map of runway on Betio and landing plans

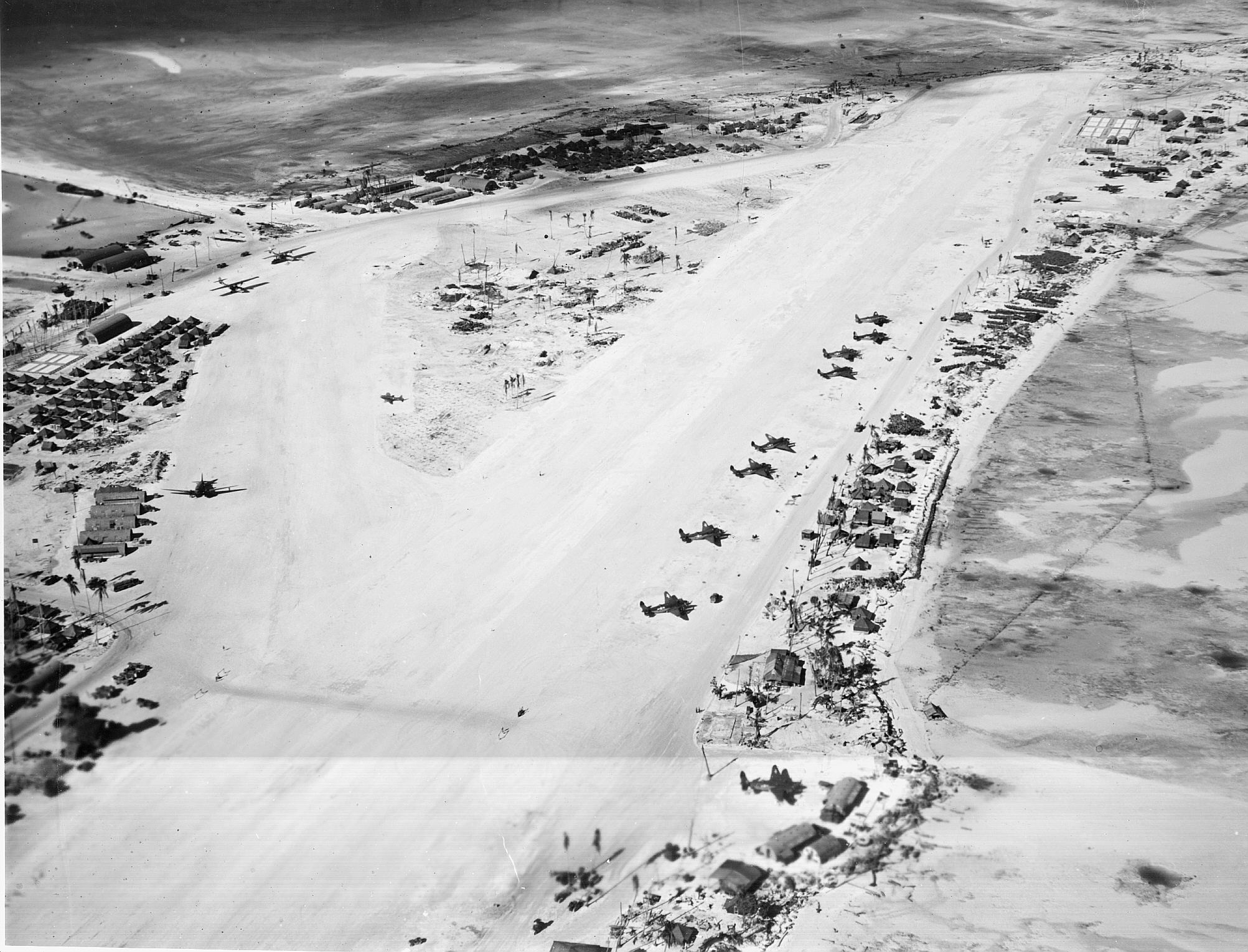
Long range aircraft at Hawkins Field (Tarawa), March 1944

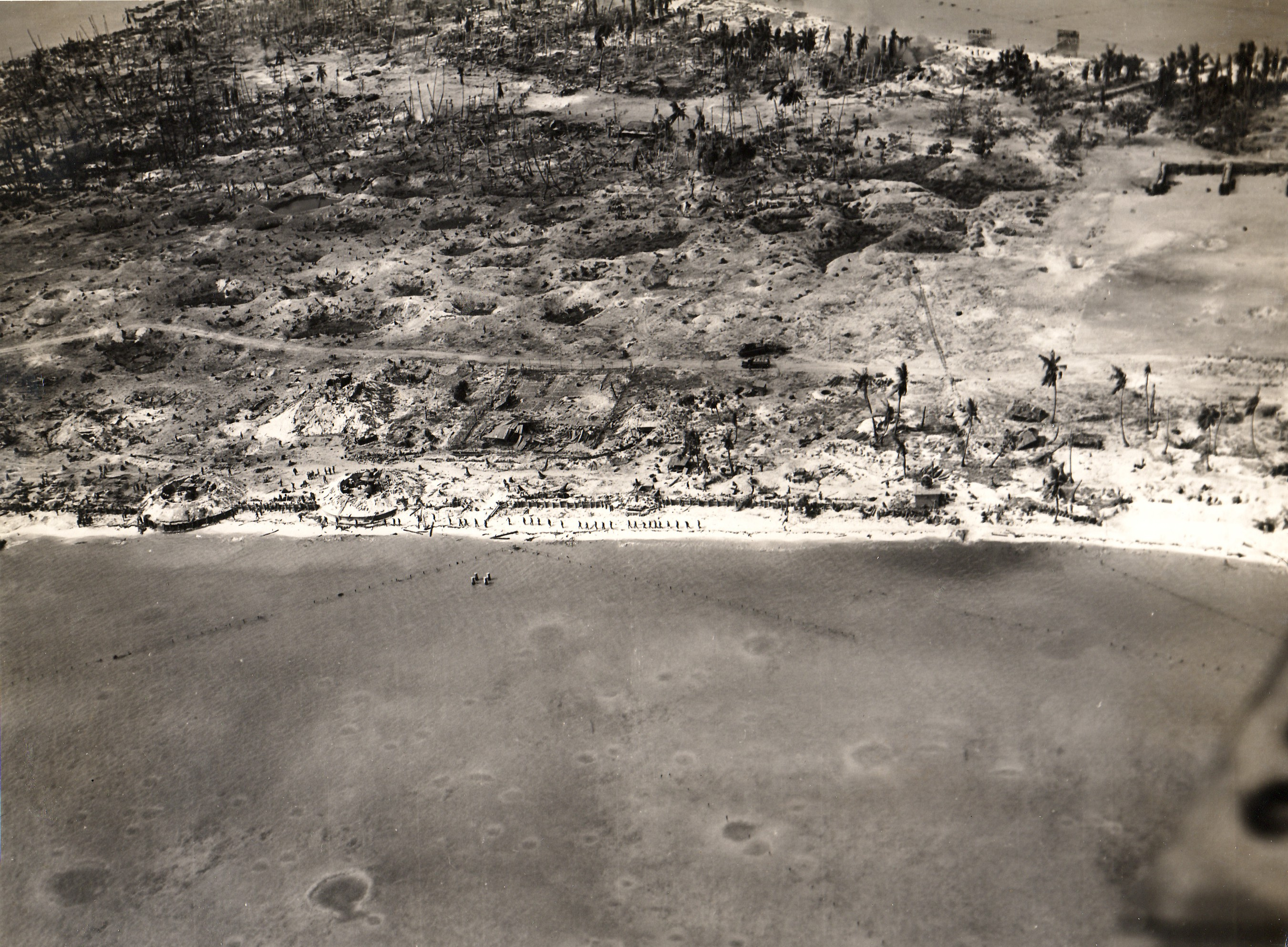
Aerial view of Betio, Tarawa Atoll, 24 November 1943, looking north toward "The Pocket", the last place of Japanese resistance. An emplacement just onshore with two 12.7 mm anti-aircraft guns is visible near the left edge of the photograph.

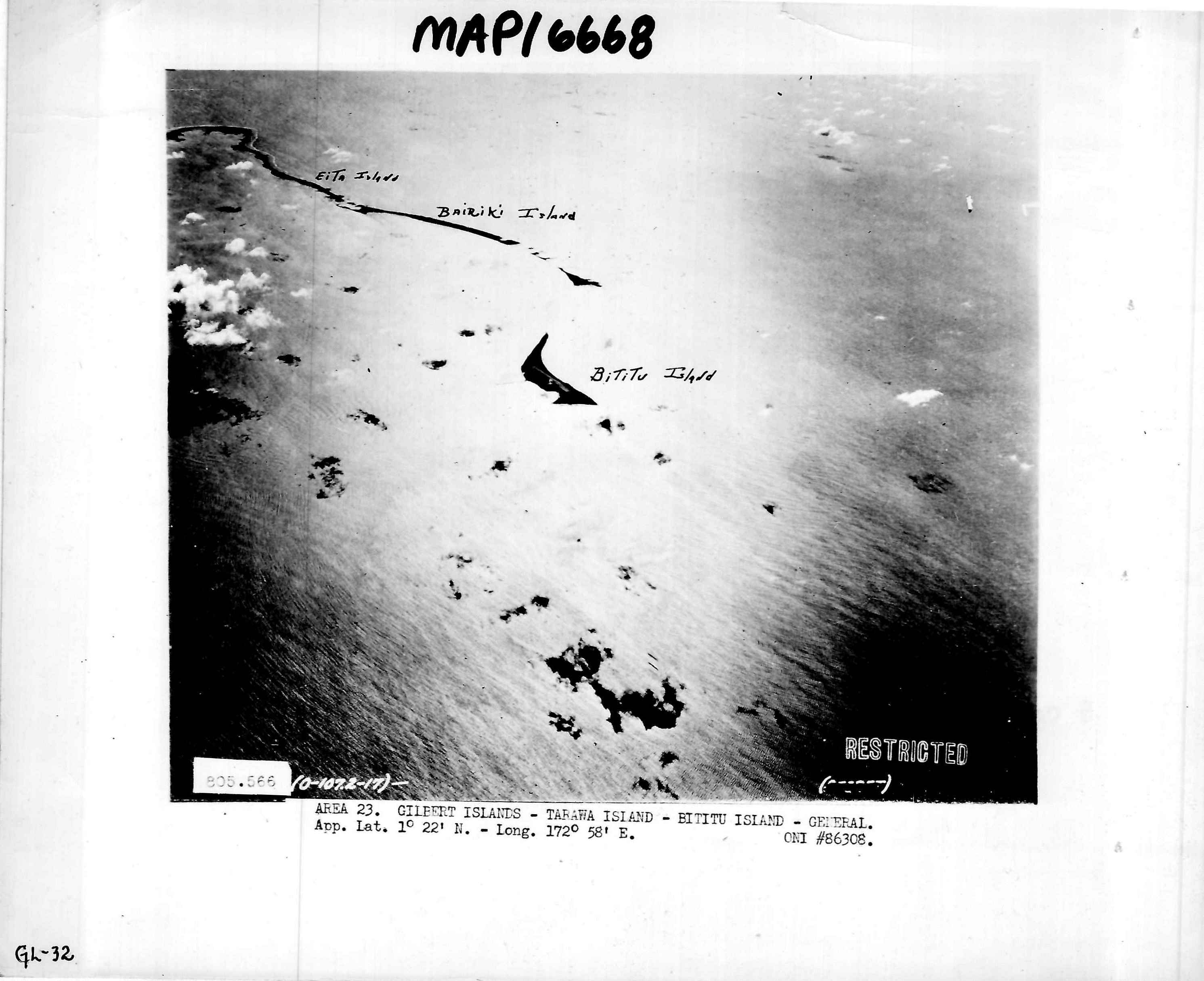
Gilbert Islands 1943

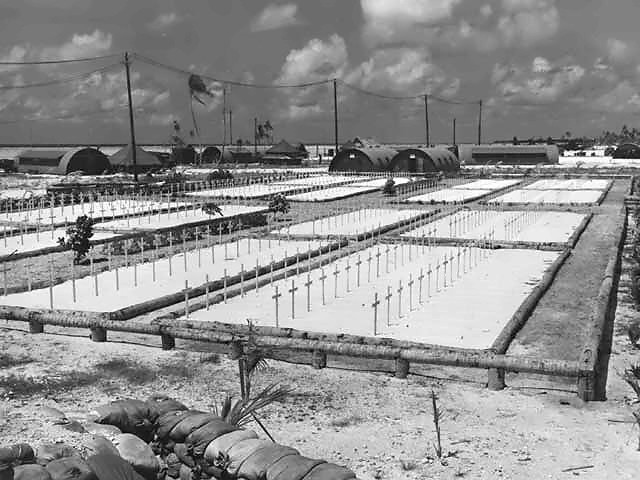
The largest of 37 cemeteries on Tarawa

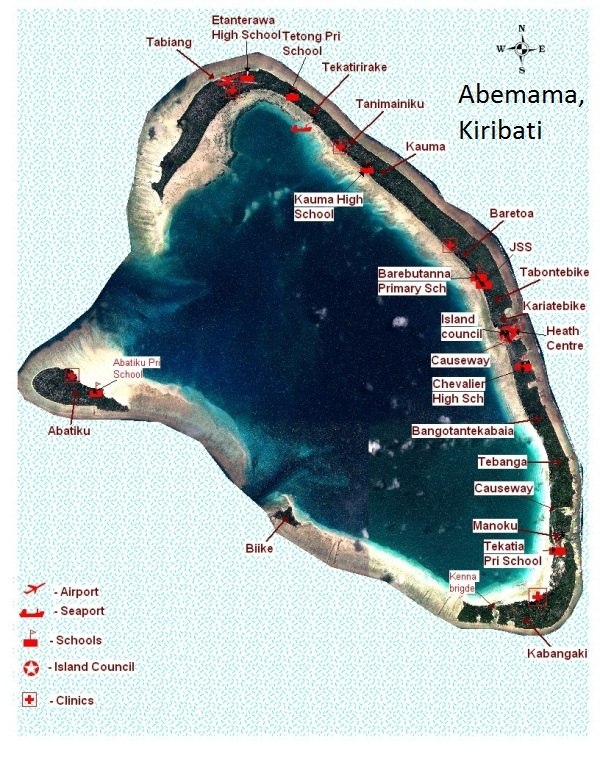
Map of Abemama

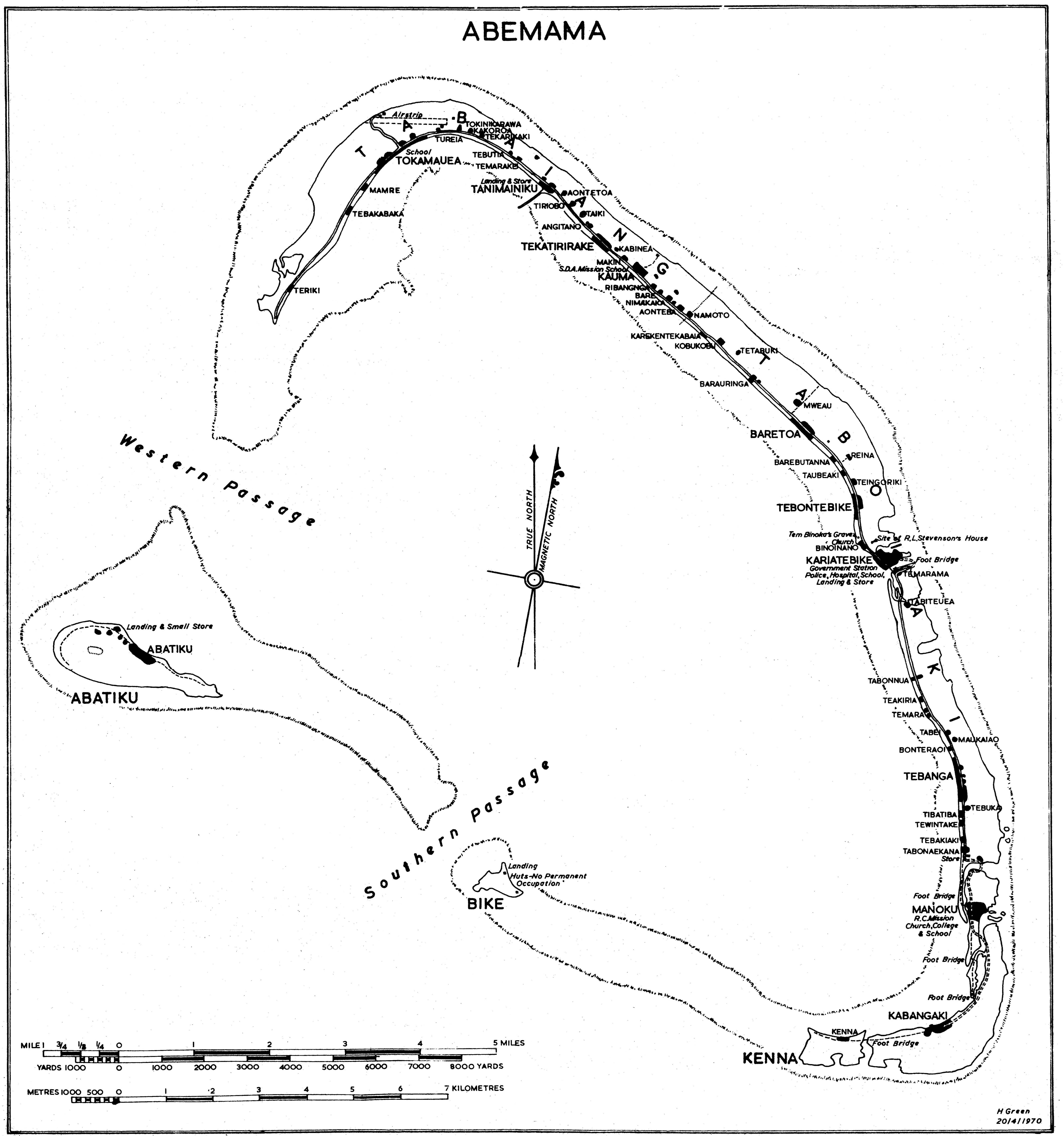
Map of Abemama

South Pacific islands in 1945

== See also ==
- US Naval Advance Bases
- Battle of Tarawa order of battle
- Gilbert Islands naval order of battle
- Makin Airfield Gilbert Islands
