= Bikeman Island =

Coordinates: 1°23′N 173°00′E

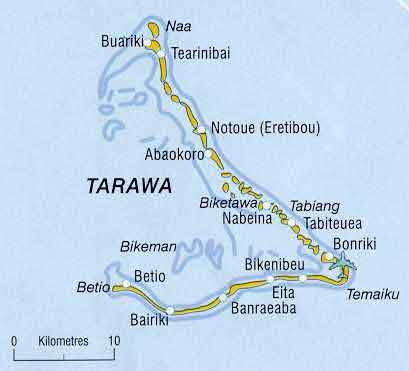
Bikeman is in the middle of Tarawa's lagoon

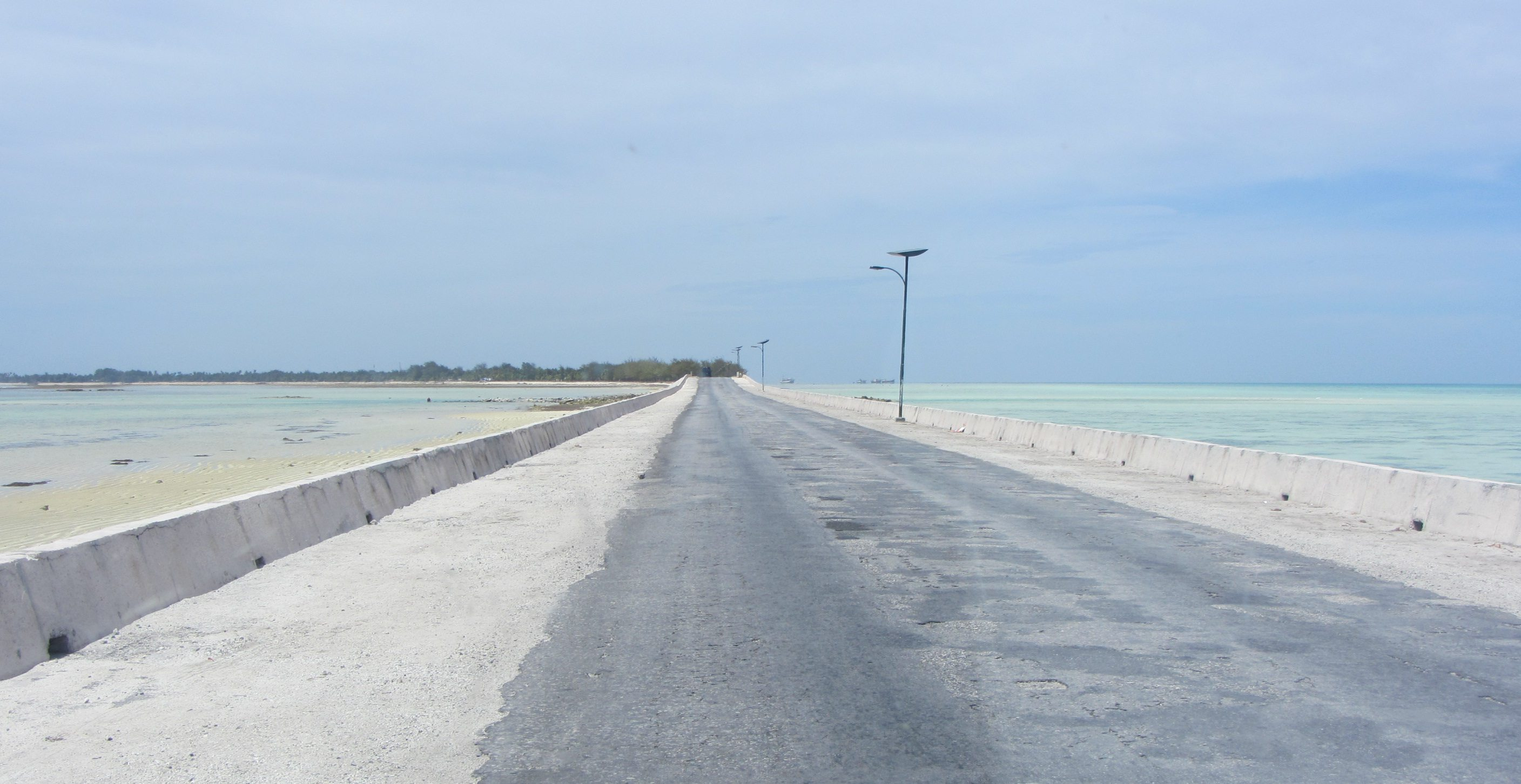
Nippon causeway, linking Bairiki and Betio

Bikeman Island is a submerged islet about a half-hour's canoe ride northeast of Betio, Kiribati. Due to changing currents and the construction of a causeway between Betio and Bairiki, Bikeman has been submerged since the early 1990s. If one were to stand on Bikeman today, the water would reach up to one's knees.

== See also ==
- Tarawa
- Desert island
- List of islands
