= Naval Base Abemama =

Former naval base of the United States

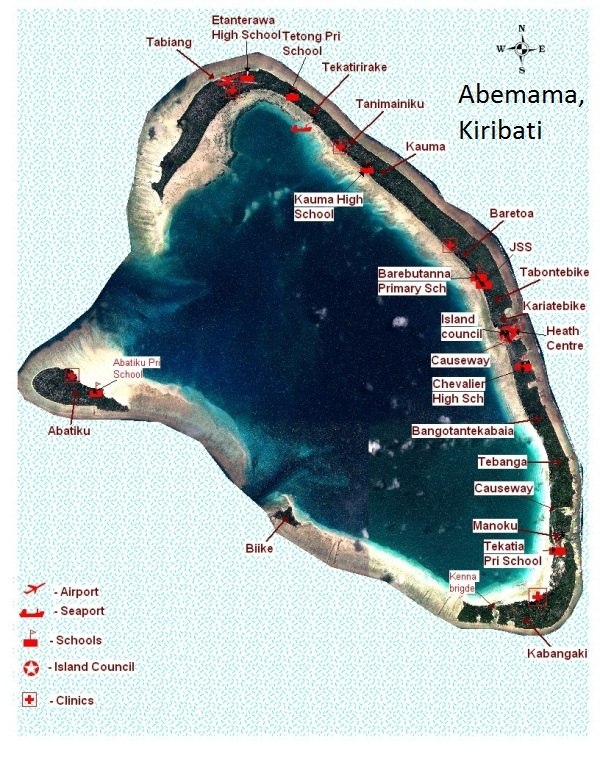
- Naval Base Abemama on Abemama Atoll; United States Navy (1943-1944)

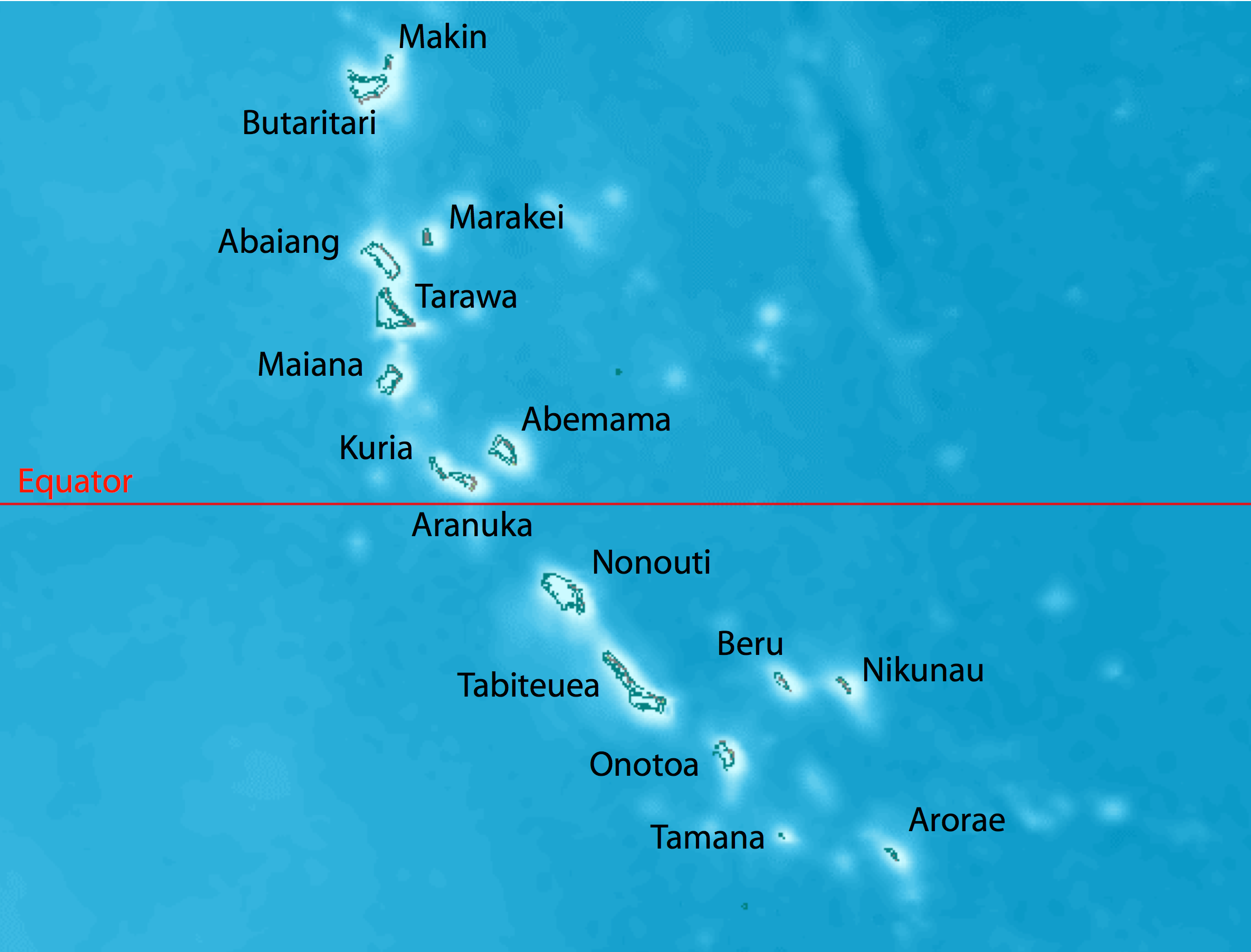
- United States Navy (1943-1944)

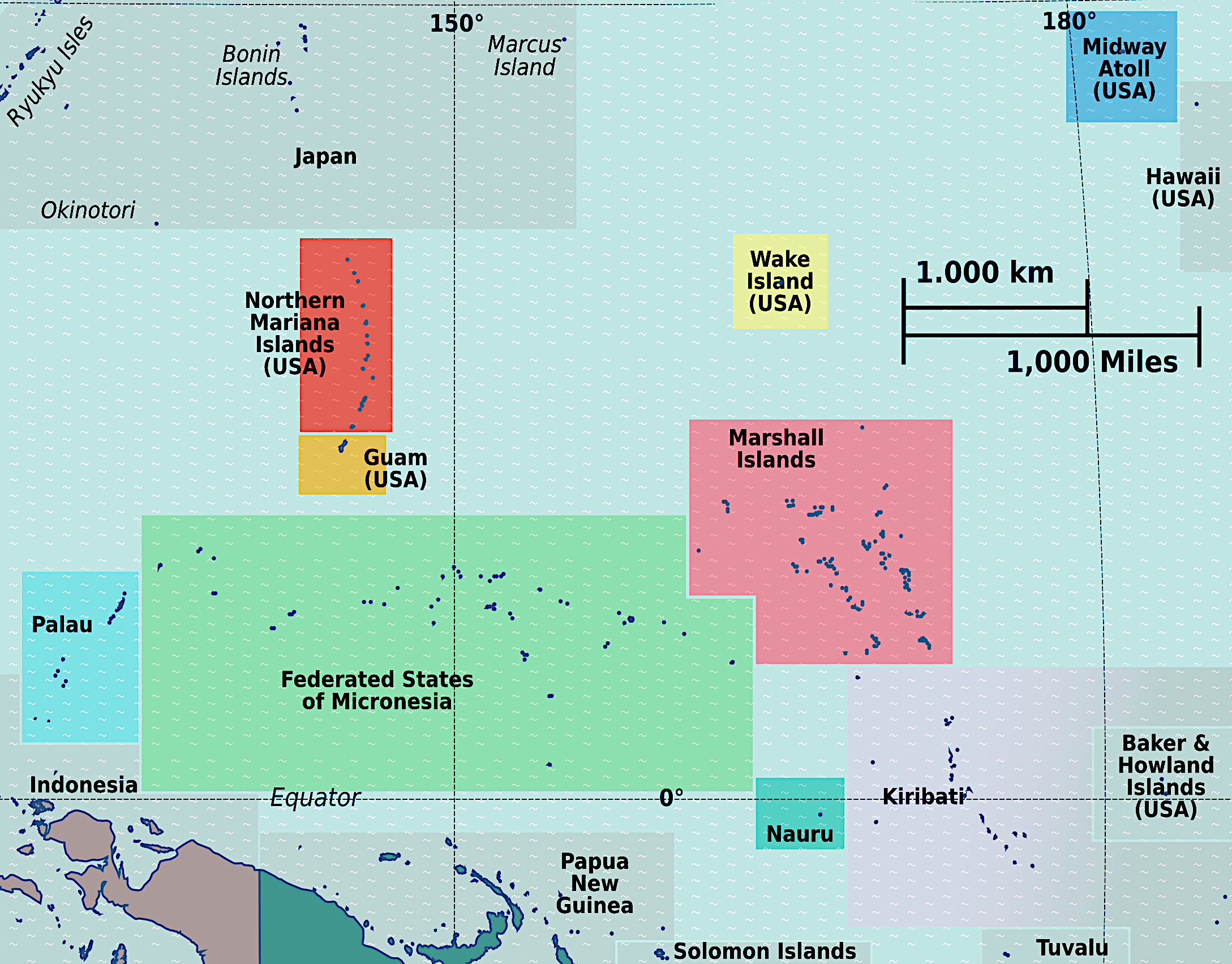
- Location within Kiribati Location within Micronesia Location within Oceania Location within Pacific Ocean

Geography
- Location: Pacific Ocean
- Coordinates: 0°29′N 173°49′E
- Archipelago: Gilbert Islands

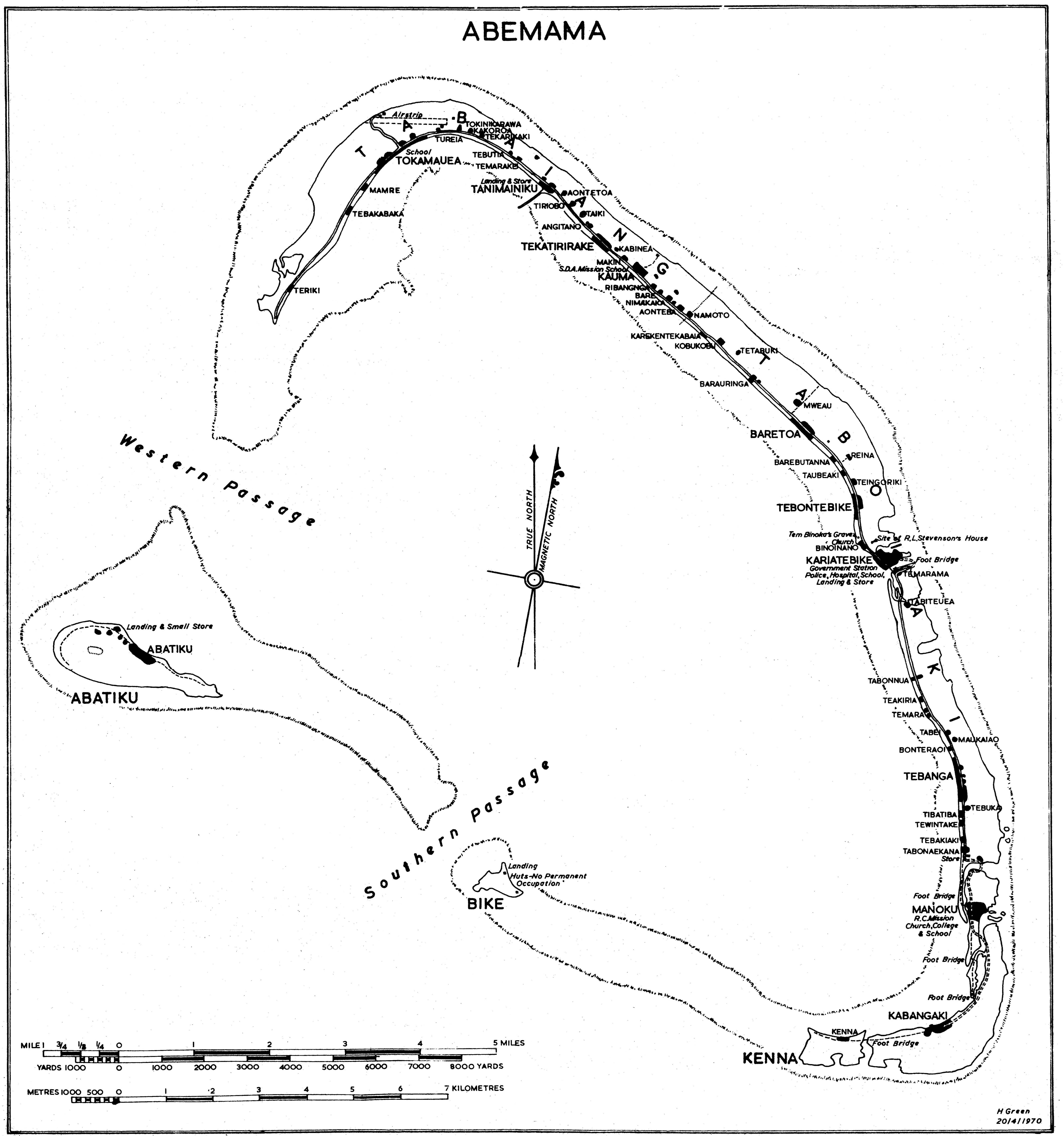
Map of Abemama

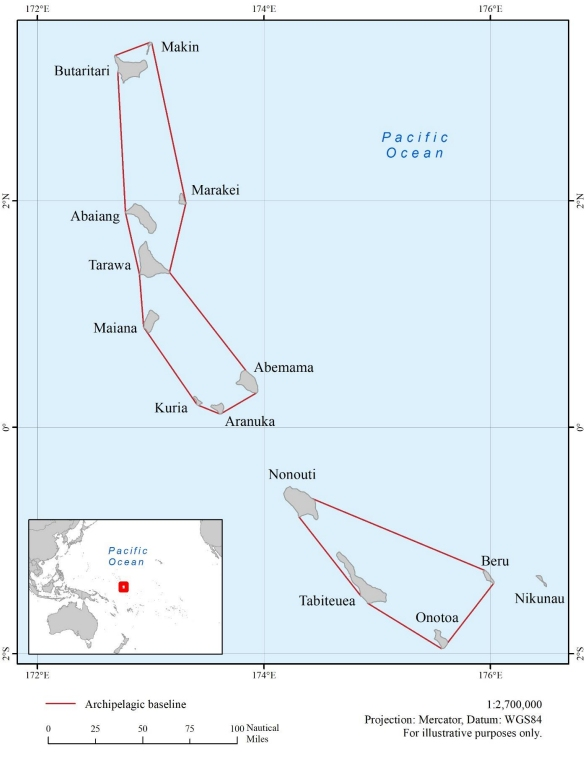
Map of Gilbert Islands, Abemama center

Naval Base Abemama was a naval base built by the United States Navy in 1943 to support the World War II effort. The base was located on Abemama atoll, also called Hopper Atoll, in the Gilbert Islands in the Central Pacific Ocean. The base was built as one of many advance bases in the island-hopping campaign towards the Empire of Japan. At Naval Base Abemama the Navy built a seaport and airbase. Construction started after the Battle of Abemama ended November 24, 1943, part of Operation Galvanic.

== History ==
After the taking of Abemama US Navy Seabees The 95th Seabee Naval Construction Battalion landed on Abemama on November 28. The island was taken with minor fighting by the United States Marine Corps that landed on November 24, 1943. The Seabee built a 4,000-foot (1,200 m) long by 150-foot (46 m) wide coral runway for fighter planes. The Apemama Airfield was named, O’Hare Field. The coral-paved runway was completed on December 10, with the first plane landing on December 13. The runway was extended to 6,000 feet (1,800 m) to support bombers by December 21. Later, it was extended to 7,700 feet (2,300 m) and widened to 200 feet (61 m) to support heavy bombers, like the B-29 Superfortress. A 1,950-foot (590 m) sand runway was built for smaller planes. The Seabee built a causeway dock and a coconut log pier so ships could unload supplies and was used for minor repair of Landing Ship, Tanks and small boats and ships. A 12,000-barrel aviation-gasoline tank farm was built. Seabee built with quonset huts: storage depot, a small hospital, a power station, refrigeration storage, offices, mess hall, Seabee camp and workshops. Tents city built for personnel stationed at the port and airfield. Abemama atoll is 15 miles (24 km) long and 6 miles (9.7 km) wide with a protected lagoon. The lagoon offered good fleet anchorage. Local native labor was employed in the initial phase of construction. A workforce of 426 was hired to unload at the beach and supply coconut logs for the pier. There were four bombing raids on the runway during the construction, one Consolidated B-24 Liberator was lost and there was minor damage to the airfield. A low-tide coral quarry was operated for the runway, roads and other uses. The Abemama location provided bombing missions to adjacent Japanese bases in the Gilberts and Marshall Islands. By 1944 the war has moved west to more forward bases. As such most operations at Apamama had moved off the island. Seabee Construction Battalion Maintenance Unit, CBMU 557 maintain the base, for the United States Army Air Forces, until its closure in the fall of 1944. The

Bases were built on two other Gilbert Islands: Naval Base Tarawa and Makin Island.

== Airfield ==
- O’Hare Field, now Abemama Airport

United States Army Air Forces units based at Apemama:

- 30th BG-Bomber Group, January 4 to March 20, 1944
- 30th BG, 27th BS (B-24) February 26 to March 14, 1944
- 30th BG, 392nd BS (B-24) January 10 to March 17, 1944
- 45th Fighter Squadron-FS (P-40s) January 4 to April 5, 1944 (operated from the Makin *January 15–24 March 1944)
- 47th BS (B-25) December 22, 1943 to April 20, 1944
- 48th Bombardment Squadron - BS (B-25) December 22, 1943 to April 23, 1944
- 7th AF, 9th Troop Carrier Squadron-TCS (C-47) March 27, 1944 to August 4, 1944
- 41st BG, 48th BS (B-25) departed July 23, 1944 for Saipan
- 41st BG, 47th BS (B-25) departed July 23, 1944 for Saipan

== Post war ==
- A Vought F4U Corsair and a B-24 Liberator from the base, are abandoned and still at the airfield, now Abemama Airport.

== See also ==
- US Naval Advance Bases
- Gilbert Islands naval order of battle
- Naval Base Gilbert Islands
