= Betio =

- Town
- Flag

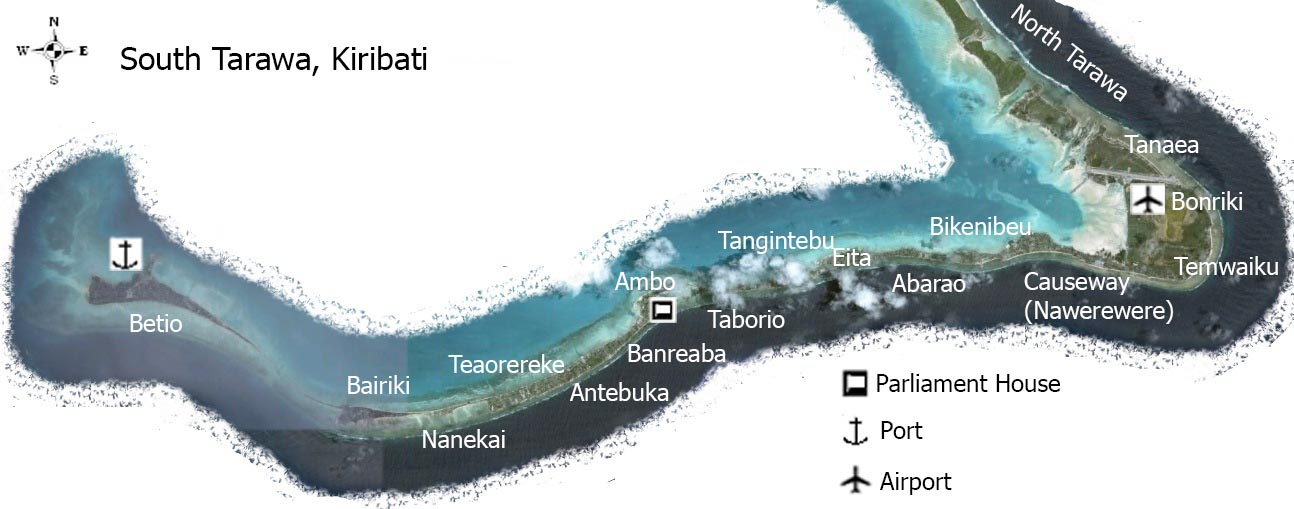
- Location in South Tarawa

- Location in Kiribati
- Coordinates: 01°21′00″N 172°56′00″E
- Country: Kiribati
- Island group: Gilbert Islands
- Atoll: Tarawa

Area
  - Total: 1.54 km^{2} (0.59 sq mi)

Population (2015)
  - Total: 17,356
  - Density: 11,300/km^{2} (29,200/sq mi)

Betio is the name of both an island and a township within the Tarawa Atoll, part of the Republic of Kiribati. Betio is the largest township of Kiribati's capital city, South Tarawa, and it is also the country's primary port. Betio is located at the far southwest corner of the atoll. The island is known for its historical significance during the Battle of Tarawa in World War 2.

== Pacific War ==
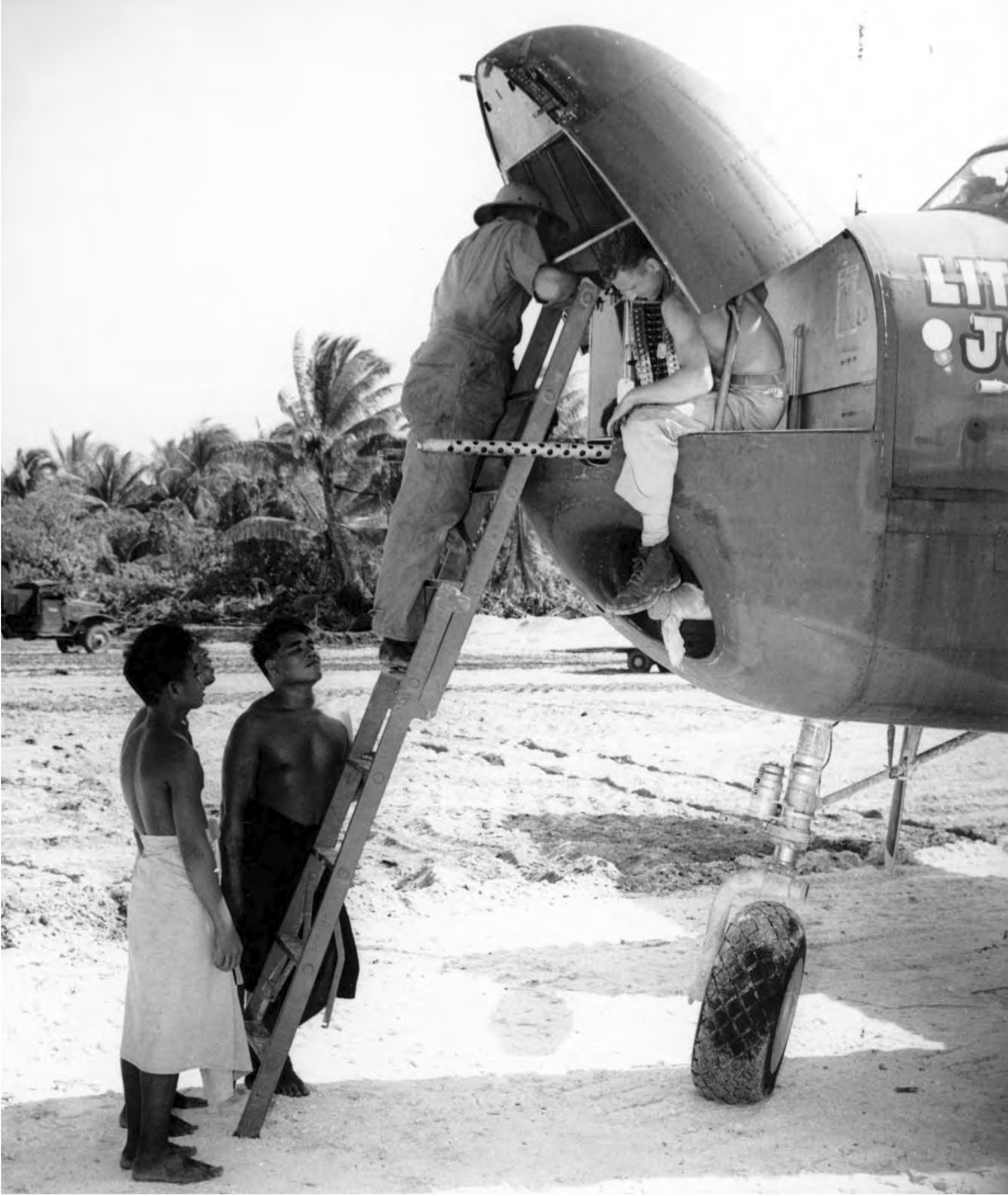
Armorers place a .50-caliber aircraft John Browning machine gun M2A1 in the nose of a 41st Bombardment Group North American B-25 Mitchell at the airfield on Hawkins Field as interested Gilbertese islanders look on.

Japanese forces attacked the island in December 1941 and occupied it the following year. Allied nationals, including seafarers and civil servants were taken prisoner and who housed on the island. Several escaped in a small open launch boat, towing a lifeboat. They sailed to Nonouti, in the Southern Gilberts, where they were met by the Degei, commanded by Captain G. J. (Jack) Webster in which they returned from Nonouti to Fiji.

Following a US air raid on the island, POWs were massacred in retaliation, by Japanese guards: there was a mass beheading of New Zealand military and civilian coastwatchers. News of the massacre was suppressed by Allied authorities at the time to the extent that New Zealand and Fijian governments did not inform the families of the men killed. Despite this, rumours reportedly circulated in New Zealand; these may have influenced the Featherstone incident (25 February 1943), when guards at a POW camp in New Zealand fired on Japanese prisoners, killing 48 and wounding 74. However, the immediate cause of the incident was the POWs' refusal to work (as permitted by the Geneva Convention).

The island was liberated by US forces in the Battle of Tarawa, in November 1943. Relics of the Japanese invasion, and the subsequent American assault on the islet in 1943, remain there. After the battle the airstrip was renamed Hawkins Field.

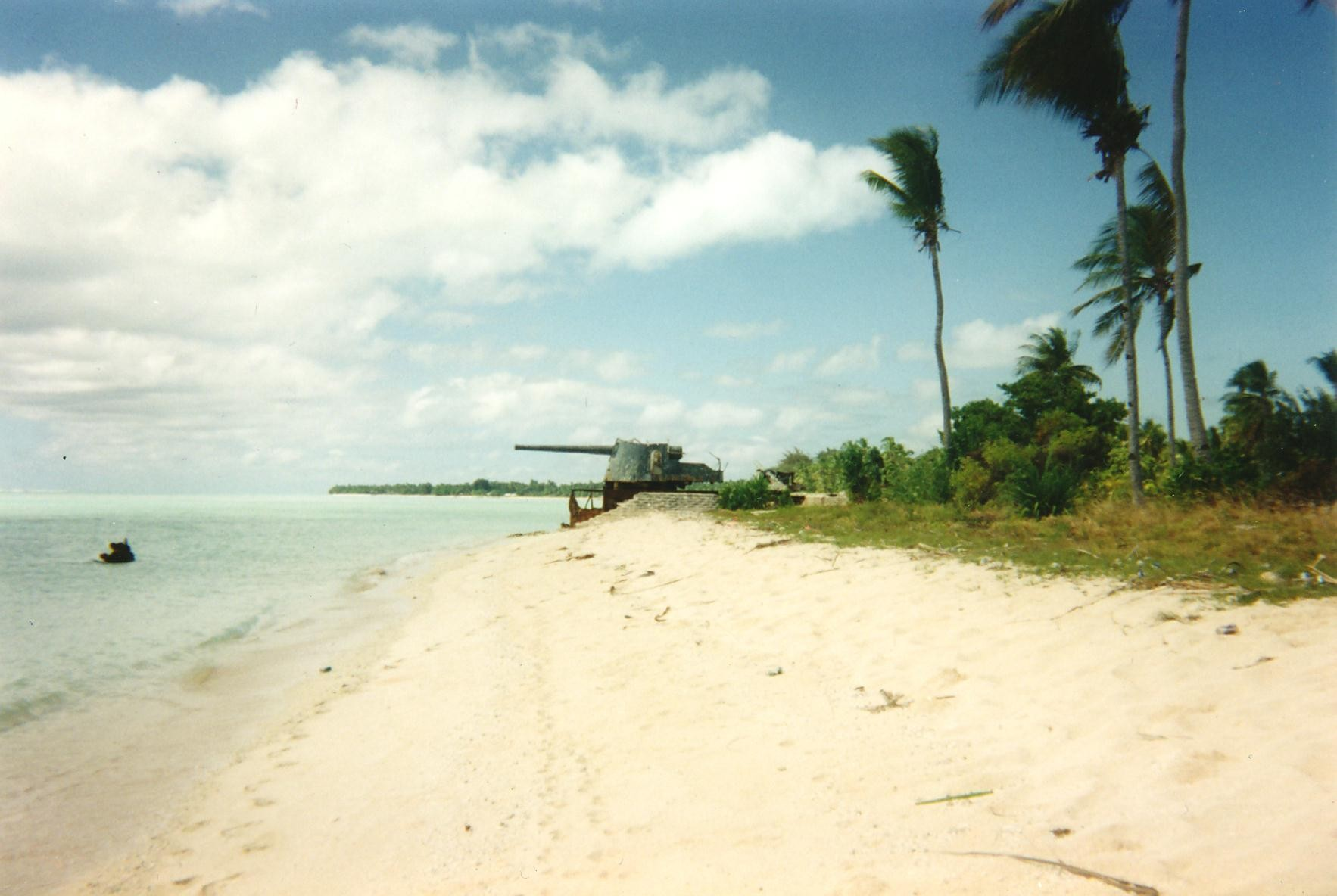
Guns left over from World War II

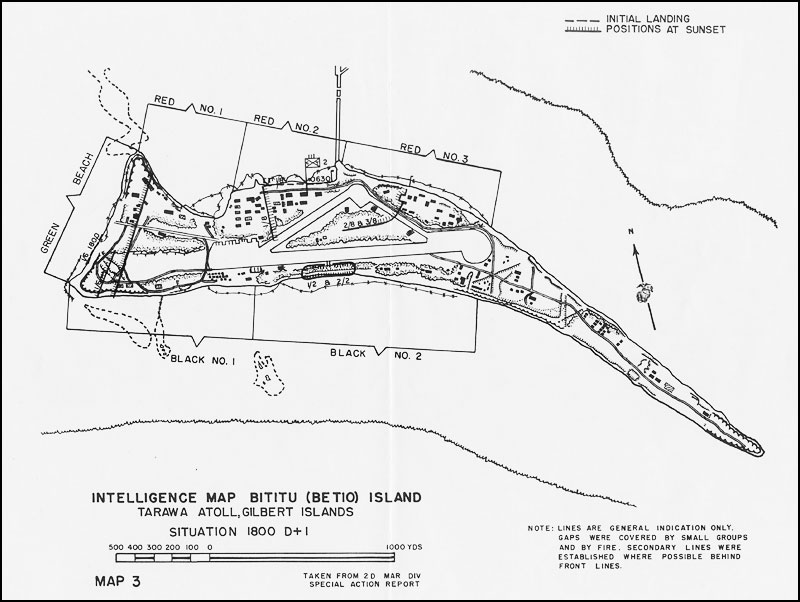
Map of Betio from World War II

Many signs of the Japanese occupation, battle and subsequent US bases have remained. The site of the former airstrip can be seen in the stunted growth of palms along its length. Many bunkers remain, as well as the remains of military equipment.The partly submerged hulk of a ship, either the Japanese freighter Saidu Maru, or the British steamer Nimanoa, would later be used as a machine gun post by the Japanese against the US forces that re-took Tarawa. Unexploded artillery shells, mortar rounds, anti-aircraft shells and live machine gun bullets left over from the Second World War are littered throughout the island and surrounding reef, as well as the remains of several hundred U.S. and Japanese soldiers. The remains of 30 U.S. soldiers and Marines were discovered in March 2019. following investigative work by History Flight, an American nonprofit which focuses on the repatriation of the remains of US military personnel who have been labeled missing in action.

== Post-War History ==
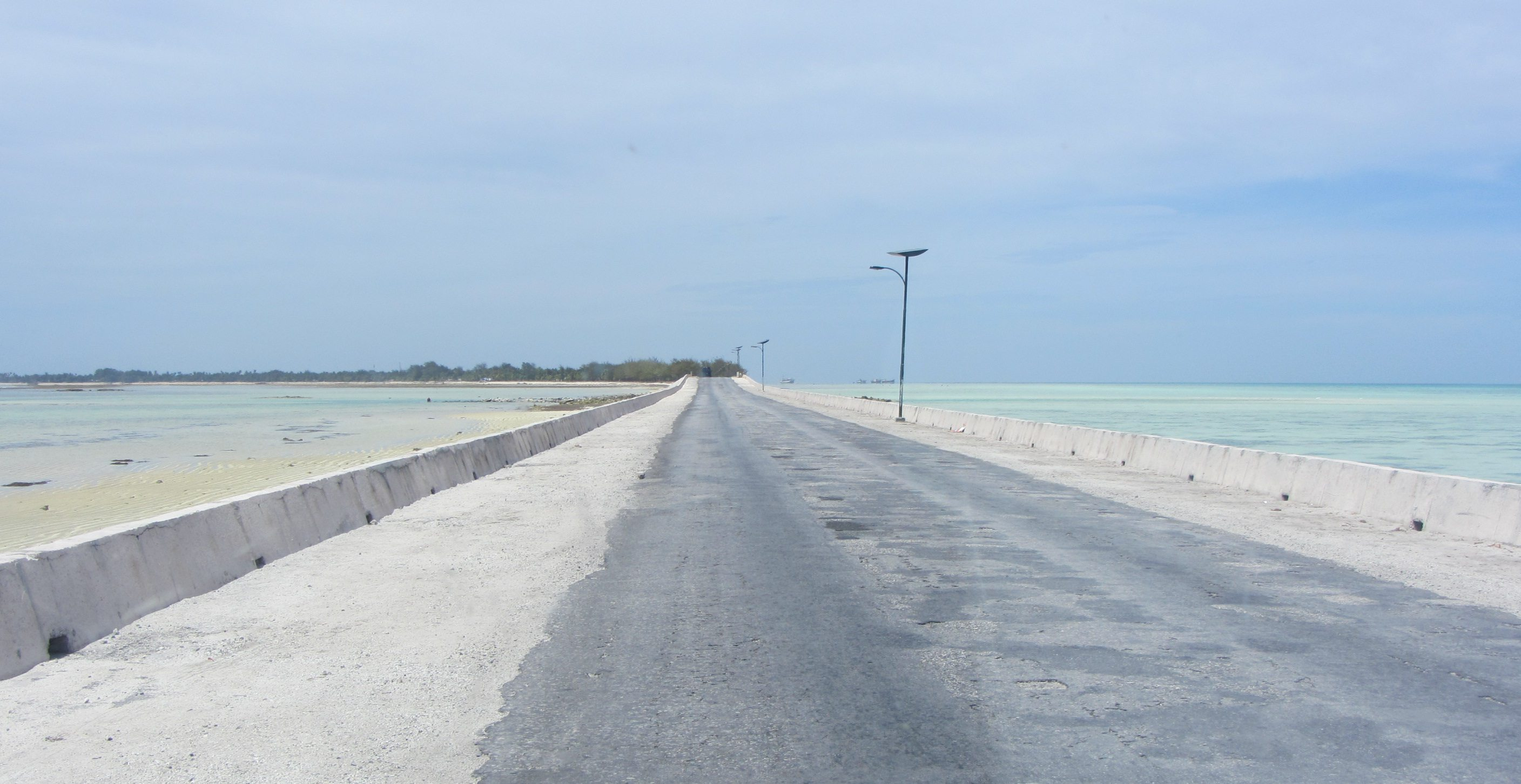
Japanese-built causeway between Betio and Bairiki islands

Following the war, the island became a center of economic activity in Kiribati. Betio Post Office opened on 5 April 1957 and closed in 1964. In 1967, the Marine Training Centre was created by Hamburg Süd. John Hilary Smith, governor of the Gilbert and Ellice Islands created the Betio Town Council in 1972.

A causeway to Bairiki was constructed in the early 1980s, leading to an increase in human contact with the island. Due to changing currents resulting from the construction of the causeway, Bikeman Island, northeast of Betio, has been submerged since the early 1990s.

== In popular culture ==
- In the 2nd and 3rd levels in Call of Duty: World at War -Final Fronts you are a Marine, Pvt. Miller, and you have to take over Betio island for its airfield.
- One of the American missions on Battlestations: Pacific sees you supporting the Marines who are going to take over the island.
- The last mission set of Medal of Honor: Pacific Assault is set during the Battle of Tarawa, where the player plays the role of a U.S. Marine.
  - Both games feature the merchant ship and the pier.
- Betio is depicted in the Franco-Belgian comic "Tarawa, atoll sanglant" by Jean-Michel Charlier and Victor Hubinon.
- In chapter 16 of Snow Falling on Cedars by David Guterson, Ishmael recalls his experience as a World War II Marine radioman during the siege of this island.
- Betio is featured in the game Heroes of the Pacific, where you must fly a reconnaissance mission over Betio in a P-38 Lightning. You also, on the day of the invasion, support the invasion by suppressing pillboxes and maintaining air superiority.
- Betio is also one of the multiplayer maps in Rising Storm, a Pacific theater expansion to Red Orchestra 2
- Betio appears in the popular ArmA II modification, Hell in the Pacific.
- 3rd Battalion, 2nd Marines 2nd Marine Division bear the nickname the "Betio Bastards" stemming from their service during World War 2 on Tarawa.
