= William D. Hawkins =

United States Marine Corps Medal of Honor recipient

William Deane Hawkins
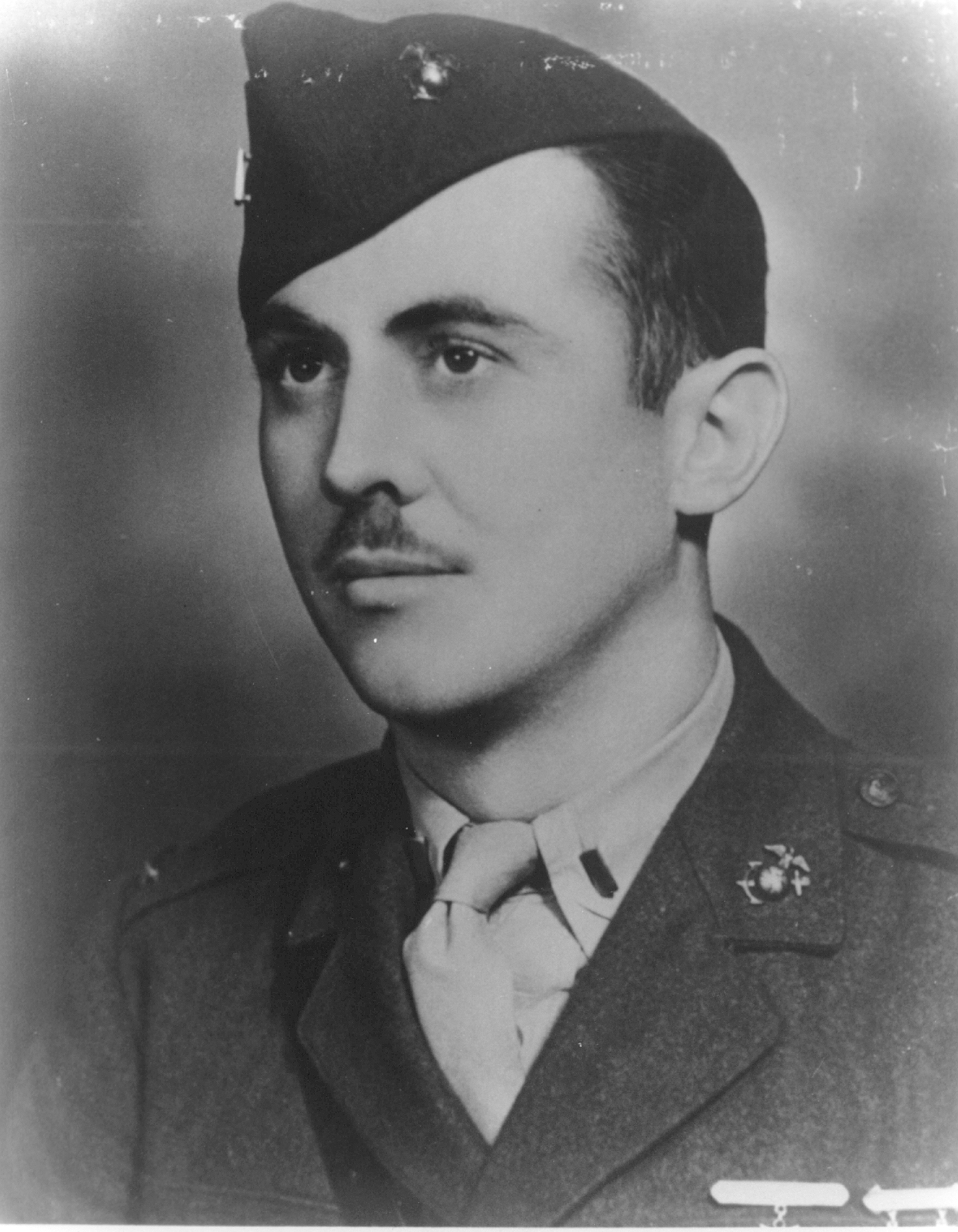
- Born: April 19, 1914; Fort Scott, Kansas
- Died: November 21, 1943 (aged 29); Betio, Gilbert Islands
- Burial place: National Memorial Cemetery of the Pacific
- Military career
- Allegiance: United States of America
- Branch: United States Marine Corps
- Service years: 1942–1943
- Rank: First Lieutenant
- Units: 2nd Battalion, 2nd Marines, 2nd Marine Division
- Conflicts: World War II: Battle of Guadalcanal; Battle of Tarawa †
- Awards: Medal of Honor; Purple Heart (3); Combat Action Ribbon

William Deane Hawkins (April 18, 1914 – November 21, 1943) was a United States Marine Corps officer who was posthumously awarded the United States' highest military honor – the Medal of Honor – for heroic actions and sacrifice of life during the Battle of Tarawa in World War II.

== Early years ==
Hawkins was born on April 18, 1914, in Fort Scott, Kansas. When he was a baby, he suffered an accident which scarred him for life. A neighbor accidentally spilled a can of scalding hot water over him and it was a year before his mother was able to cure the muscular damage by massage and he could walk again.

When he was five, the family moved to El Paso, Texas; when he was eight, his father died and his mother had to seek outside employment. She was employed as the secretary to a high school principal and, later, as a teacher in the El Paso Technical Institute.

An excellent student, he skipped fifth grade at LaMar and Alta Vista Schools and graduated from El Paso High School when he was 16. He won a scholarship to the Texas College of Mines, where he studied engineering. During summer vacations, he delivered magazines and sold newspapers, and worked as a bellhop, ranch hand, and railroad laborer.

When he was 21, he went to Tacoma, Washington, to work. At 23, he was an engineer for a Los Angeles title-insurance company.

== Marine Corps service ==
After Pearl Harbor was attacked, he enlisted in the Marine Corps Reserve on January 5, 1942, and was assigned to the 7th Recruit Battalion, Marine Corps Recruit Depot, San Diego. He had tried unsuccessfully to enter both the Army and the Navy Air Corps, but his scars prevented his being accepted. Now, as a Marine, he was assigned to the 2nd Marine Regiment, 2nd Marine Division, completed Scout Snipers' School at Camp Elliott, San Diego, and on July 1, 1942, embarked aboard the USS Crescent City for the Pacific area.

A private first class when he went overseas, he was quickly promoted to corporal and then sergeant. On November 17, 1942, he was commissioned a second lieutenant while taking part in the Guadalcanal campaign in the battle for the Solomons. On June 1, 1943, he was promoted to first lieutenant.

Less than six months later, Hawkins was killed in action leading a scout-sniper platoon in the attack on Betio Island during the assault on Tarawa. During the two-day assault, 1st Lt. Hawkins led attacks on pill boxes and installations, personally initiated an assault on a hostile position fortified by five enemy machine guns, refused to withdraw after being seriously wounded and destroyed three more pill boxes before he was mortally wounded on November 21, 1943. For his actions above and beyond the call of duty, 1st Lt. Hawkins posthumously received the Medal of Honor.

In September 1944, the Medal of Honor was presented to Hawkins' mother by President Franklin D. Roosevelt in a White House ceremony.

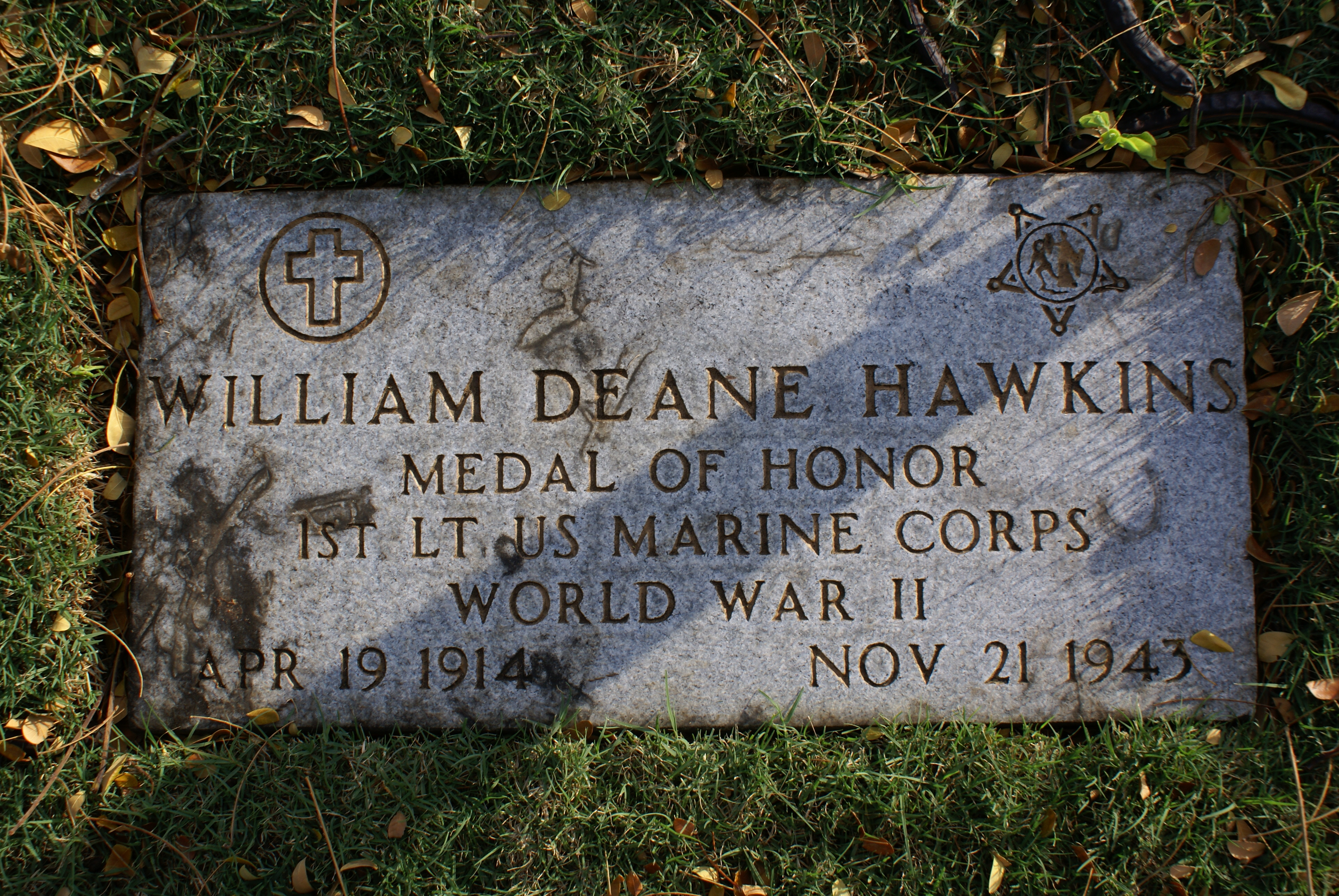
Grave stone of William Deane Hawkins in the National Memorial Cemetery of the Pacific (Punchbowl), Honolulu, Hawaii

1stLt Hawkins' remains were eventually interred in the National Memorial Cemetery of the Pacific in Honolulu, Hawaii.

== Remembrances and honors ==
Robert Sherrod, then Editor of The Saturday Evening Post, wrote the following about the Marine platoon commander:

Hawkins had told me aboard the ship that he would put his platoon of men up against any company of soldiers on earth and guarantee to win. He was slightly wounded by shrapnel as he came ashore in the first wave, but the furthest thing from his mind was to be evacuated. He led his platoon into the forest of coconut palms. During a day and a half he personally cleaned out six Jap machine gun nests, sometimes standing on top of a track and firing point blank at four or five men who fired back at him from behind blockhouses. Lieutenant Hawkins was wounded a second time, but he still refused to retire. To say that his conduct was worthy of the highest traditions of the Marine Corps is like saying the Empire State Building is moderately high.

In recognition of his leadership and daring action against enemy positions, the air strip on Betio Island was named Hawkins Field in honor of the Marine hero. With his unit 1st Lt. Hawkins also shared in the two Presidential Unit Citations awarded the 1st Marine Division (Reinforced) for heroic action during the Guadalcanal and Tarawa campaigns.

The bar at The Basic School, is named after Hawkins. The Basic School is a six-month basic officer course for newly commissioned 2nd lieutenants and warrant officers. Because 1st Lt. Hawkins received a battlefield commission, he never attended The Basic School.

Camp LeJeune in North Carolina had a winter camp named after Lt. Hawkins.

Camp H.M. Smith in Honolulu, Hawaii, has a small area of land identified as Camp Hawkins, named after 1st Lt. Deane Hawkins. The site is located at the extreme northeast portion of Camp Smith and now sits within a secured perimeter fence line. Originally used in the later part of the Second World War as an R&R location, the site contains a small stone cabin and overlooks the southern coast of Oahu, from Diamond Head to Barber's Point, Hawaii. Cornerstones on either side of the cabin's doorway, identified the area "Shangri La" as it was dubbed by the construction engineers and the cabin itself is identified as ‘Camp McMullan’. Camp Hawkins was used as a training area for Marines, a recreation area (with the addition of playground equipment in the 1970s) and a camp ground for military personnel and their families. Today, it is used almost exclusively as a camp site for local Boy Scout organizations.

In El Paso, Texas, Hawkins Road and Hawkins Elementary are both named after Deane Hawkins.

Hawkins' archives were kept by his mother, Mrs. C. Jane Hawkins, and are in the possession of the El Paso County Historical Society.

== Medal of Honor citation ==
The President of the United States takes pleasure in presenting the MEDAL OF HONOR posthumously to

FIRST LIEUTENANT WILLIAM D. HAWKINS
UNITED STATES MARINE CORPS RESERVE

for service as set forth in the following CITATION:

For valorous and gallant conduct above and beyond the call of duty as Commanding Officer of a Scout Sniper Platoon attached to the Second Marines, Second Marine Division, in action against Japanese-held Tarawa in the Gilbert Islands, November 20 and 21, 1943. The first to disembark from the jeep lighter, First lieutenant Hawkins unhesitatingly moved forward under heavy enemy fire at the end of the Betio pier, neutralizing emplacements in coverage of troops assaulting the main breach positions. Fearlessly leading his men on to join the forces fighting desperately to gain a beachhead, he repeatedly risked his life throughout the day and night to direct and lead attacks on pill boxes and installations with grenades and demolition. At dawn on the following day, First Lieutenant Hawkins returned to the dangerous mission of clearing the limited beachhead of Japanese resistance, personally initiating an assault on a hostile fortified by five enemy machine guns and, crawling forward in the face of withering fire, boldly fired point-blank into the loopholes and completed the destruction with grenades. Refusing to withdraw after being seriously wounded in the chest during this skirmish, First Lieutenant Hawkins steadfastly carried the fight to the enemy, destroying three more pill boxes before he was caught in a burst of Japanese shell fire and mortally wounded. His relentless fighting spirit in the face of formidable opposition and his exceptionally daring tactics were an inspiration to his comrades during the most crucial phase of the battle and reflect the highest credit upon the United States Naval Service. He gallantly gave his life for his country.

/S/ FRANKLIN D. ROOSEVELT

== Awards and decorations ==

1st row	Medal of Honor	Purple Heart with two gold stars	Combat Action Ribbon
3rd row	American Campaign Medal	Asiatic-Pacific Campaign Medal with one campaign star	World War II Victory Medal

== See also ==
- List of Medal of Honor recipients
