= Hawkins Field (Tarawa) =

Former military WW2 airfield on Betio Island, Tarawa Atoll, Gilbert Islands

Hawkins Field
- Part of Seventh Air Force
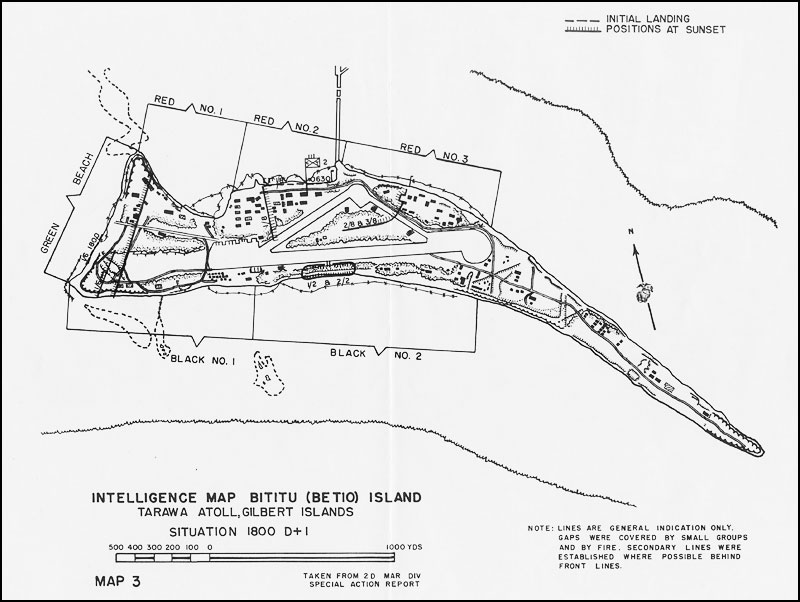

Site information
- Type: Military airfield
- Controlled by: United States Army Air Forces

Location
- Coordinates: 01°21′22.49″N 172°55′48.39″E

Site history
- Built: 1943
- In use: 1944–1945

Hawkins Field is a former World War II airfield on Betio, Tarawa in the Gilbert Islands of the Central Pacific.

The airfield was named in honor of USMC 1st Lt. William Dean Hawkins who was killed in the battle to recapture Tarawa, and earned the Medal of Honor.

== History ==
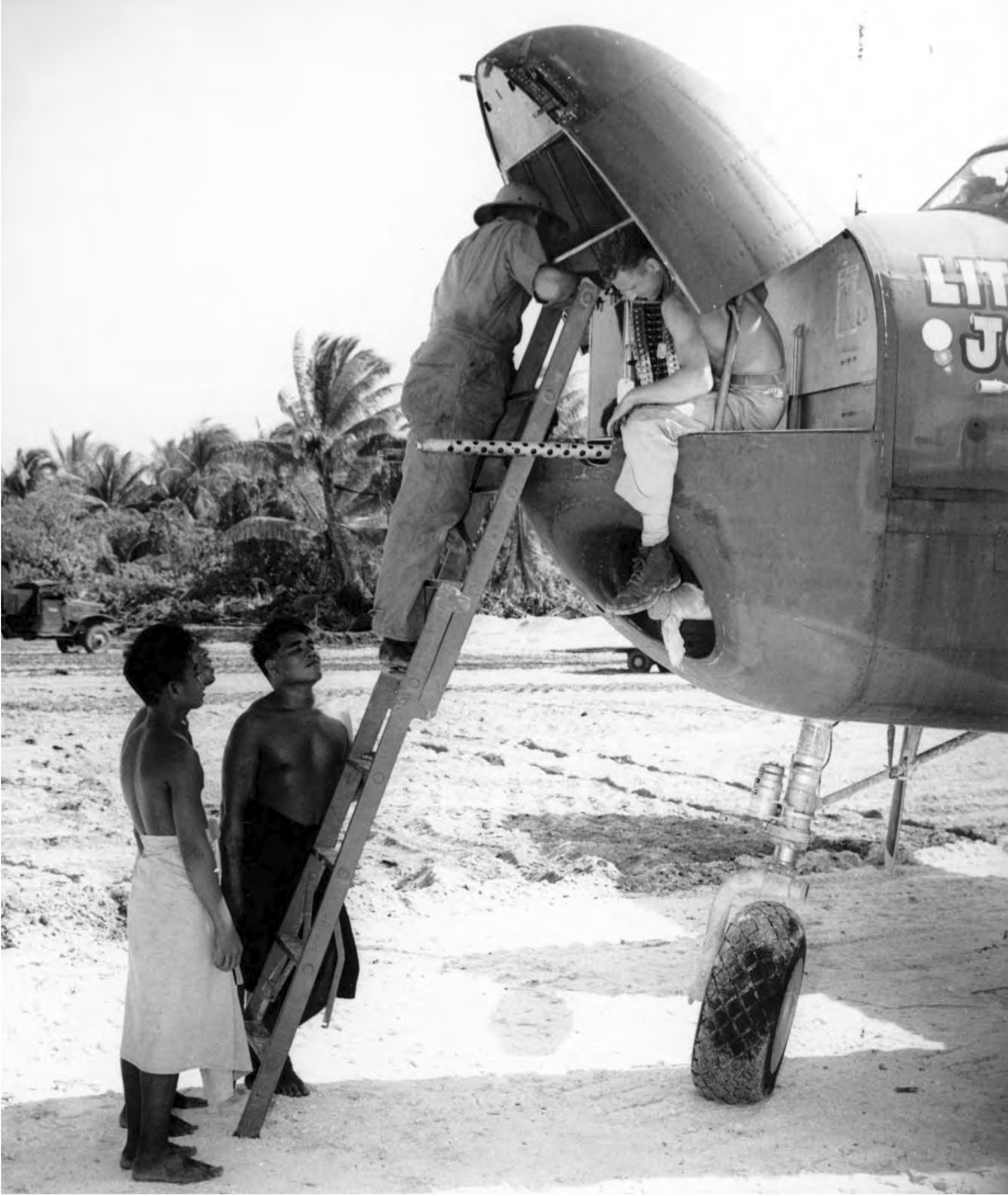
Armorers place a .50-caliber aircraft John Browning machine gun M2A1 in the nose of a 41st Bombardment Group North American B-25 Mitchell at the airfield on Hawkins Field as interested natives look on

The airfield was built during the Japanese occupation of the Gilbert Islands in 1943. There was a turnaround at the eastern end of the runway and a taxiway with revetments in the middle between the runway and the taxiway. The Japanese had Zeros, Vals, Nells and Bettys operating from this base. During the Battle of Tarawa (November 20 – 23, 1943), United States Marines seized the airfield as a target of the operation, to enable USAAF land-based air operations against the Japanese in the Marshall Islands.

After the battle, US Navy Seebees from the 2nd Battalion 18th Marines, 74th and 98th Naval Construction Battalions bulldozed all the debris off the airfield and extended the runway right to the western end and coral surfaced it. Initially the USAAF moved the 41st Bombardment Group to Hawkins which operated four squadrons of B-25 Mitchell medium bombers from the airfield starting in December.

In January 1944, Hawkins became the headquarters of the United States Army Air Forces VII Bomber Command, directing operations against Japanese forces in the Marshall Islands. The USAAF then stationed the B-24 Liberator-equipped 11th Bombardment Group at Hawkins, however the length of the runway was marginal for the bombers, and instead the USAAF units moved to Bairiki (Mullinix) Airfield on nearby Bonriki Islet which had a longer runway. By late January, the USAAF moved both groups over to Bonriki and Hawkins was then used by Naval fighters, light aircraft and as an emergency landing airfield for Mullinix.

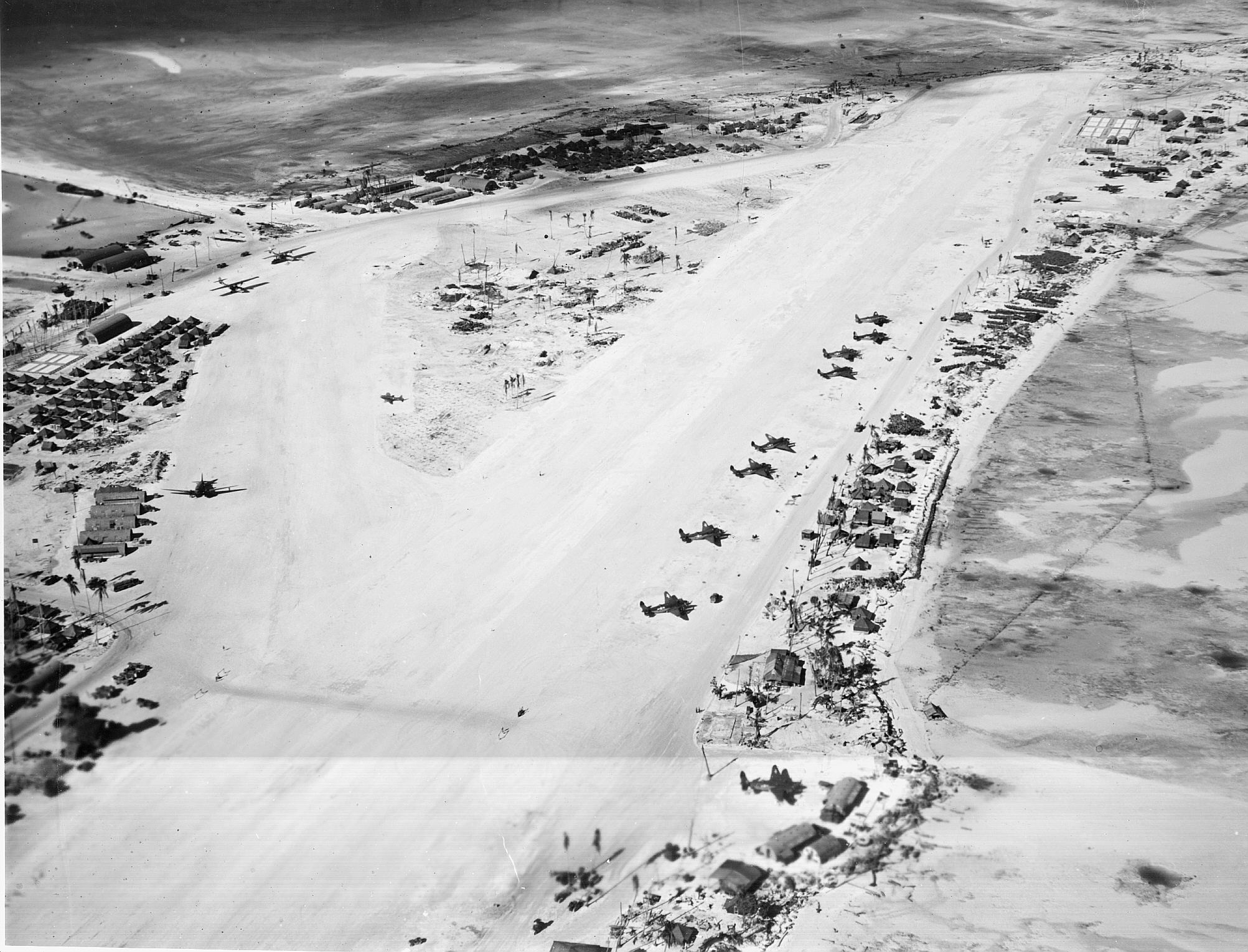
Aerial view of Hawkins Field in March 1944

As the battles moved further towards Japan, the airfield was abandoned and after the war, the island was redeveloped using much of the materiel left by the Americans during the war. Today, the roads on the island reflect the outlines of the airfield and supporting roads of the wartime facilities. US Naval fleet PO box for Hawkins Field was 907.

== See also ==
- USAAF in the Central Pacific
- Naval Base Gilbert Islands
