= Gilbert Islands naval order of battle =

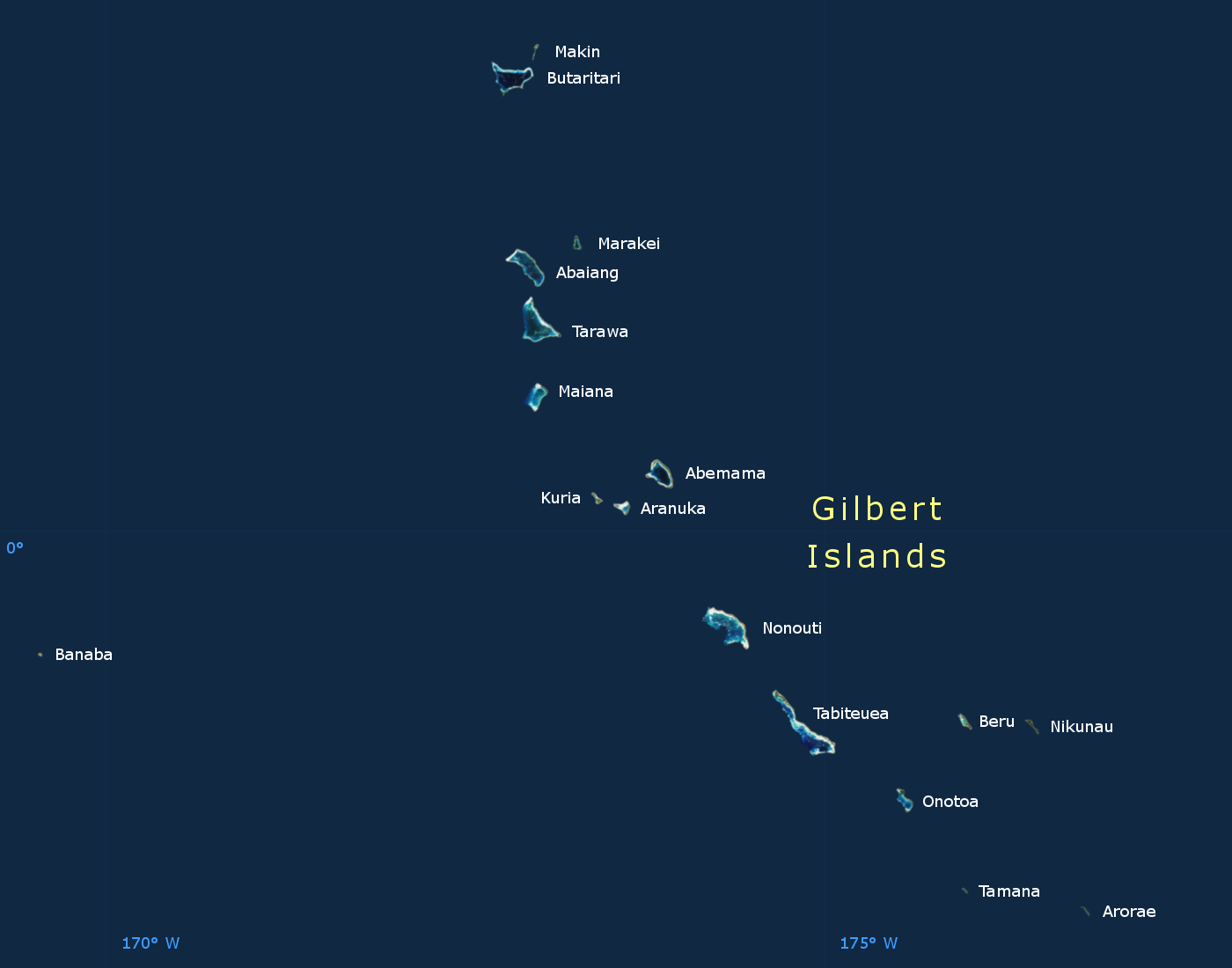
Gilbert Islands

On 20 November 1943, simultaneous landings were made by United States Marine Corps forces on Tarawa and United States Army forces on Makin, two coral atolls located in the Gilbert Islands chain in the South-Central Pacific.

Unlike at the Allied landings on Guadalcanal the previous fall, the Japanese chose to violently oppose the Marines on the beach at Betio, the principal island of the Tarawa Atoll. These extremely well-planned defenses, combined with unexpected tidal conditions, made the fight for Tarawa one of the most difficult for the Marine Corps of the entire Pacific Theater.

Makin was declared secure on 25 November, Tarawa on 27 November.

The naval forces assigned to capture the Gilberts formed the largest armada yet assembled by either side in the Pacific, considerably larger than the Allied force that mounted the invasion of Guadalcanal and dwarfing the Japanese force that attacked Pearl Harbor.

TF 50 – Carrier Force (Task Force 50):

6 fleet carriers, 5 light carriers, 6 fast battleships, 3 heavy cruisers, 3 anti-aircraft light cruisers, 21 destroyers

TF 52 – Northern Attack Force (Makin) (Task Force 52):

3 escort carriers, 4 old battleships, 4 heavy cruisers, 15 destroyers, 1 minesweeper, 5 transports, 4 landing ships

TF 53 – Southern Attack Force (Tarawa) (Task Force 53):

5 escort carriers, 3 old battleships, 2 heavy cruisers, 2 light cruisers, 22 destroyers, 2 minesweepers, 16 transports, 4 landing ships

== Command structure ==
Naval commanders

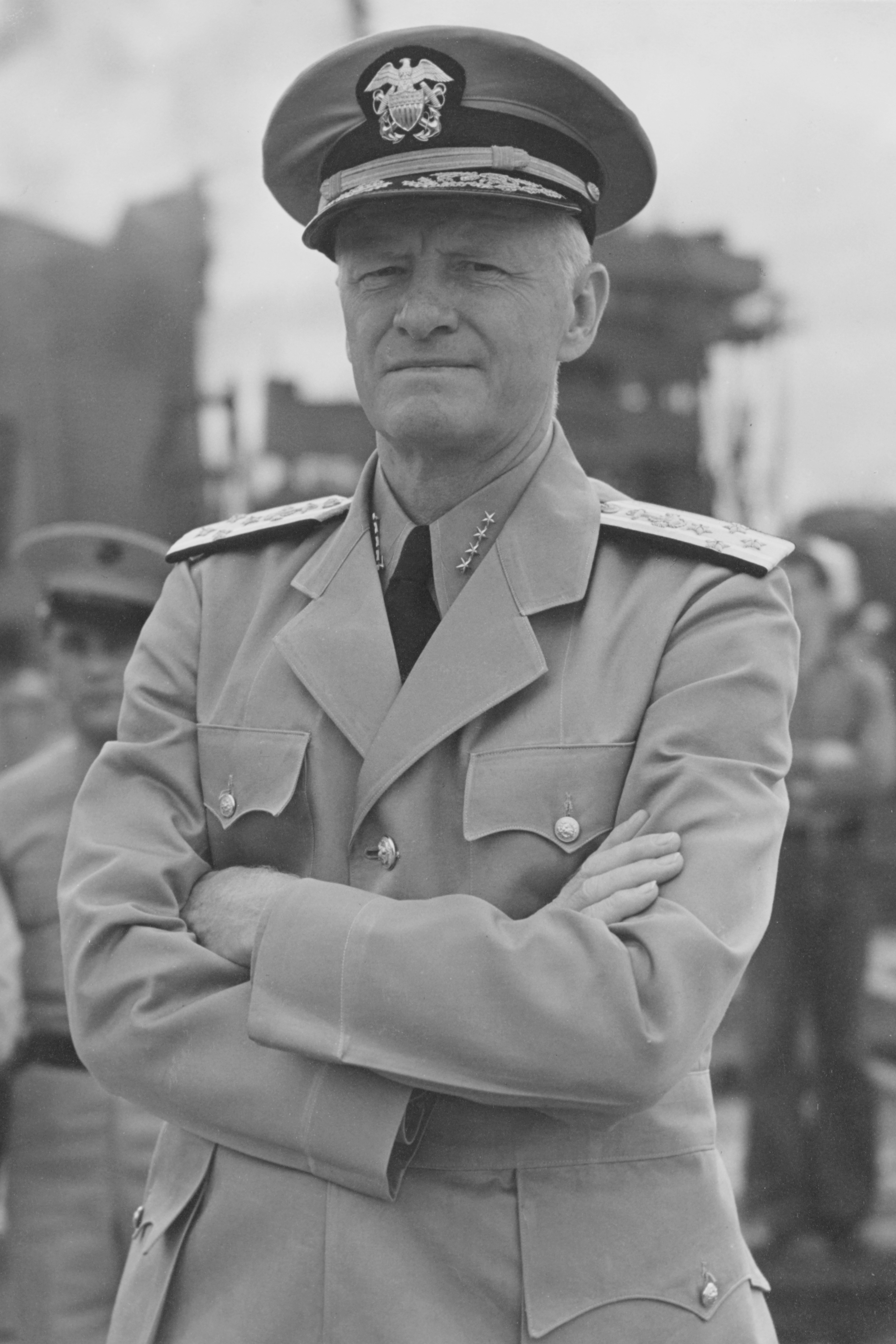
Adm. Chester W. Nimitz

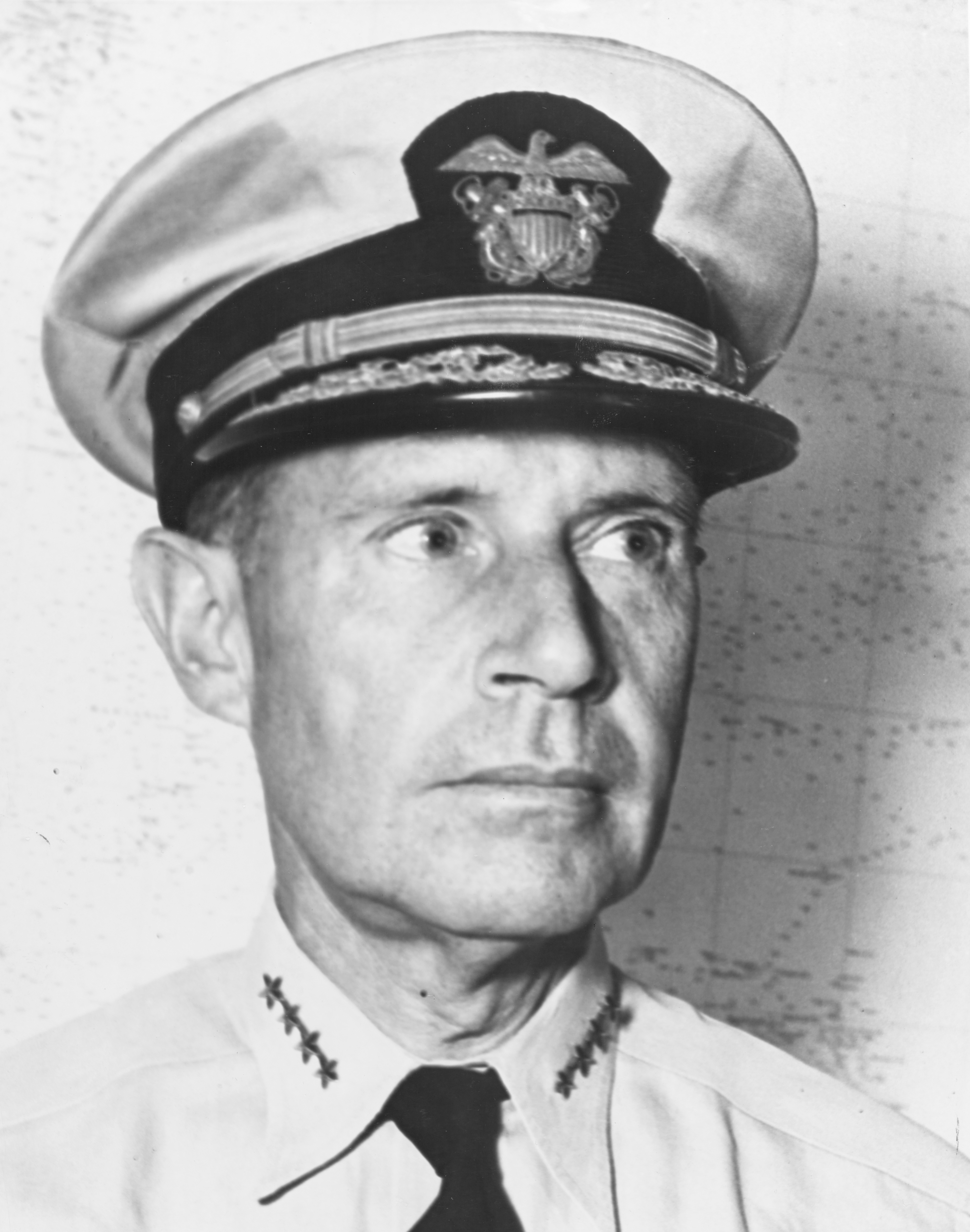
Vice Adm. Raymond A. Spruance

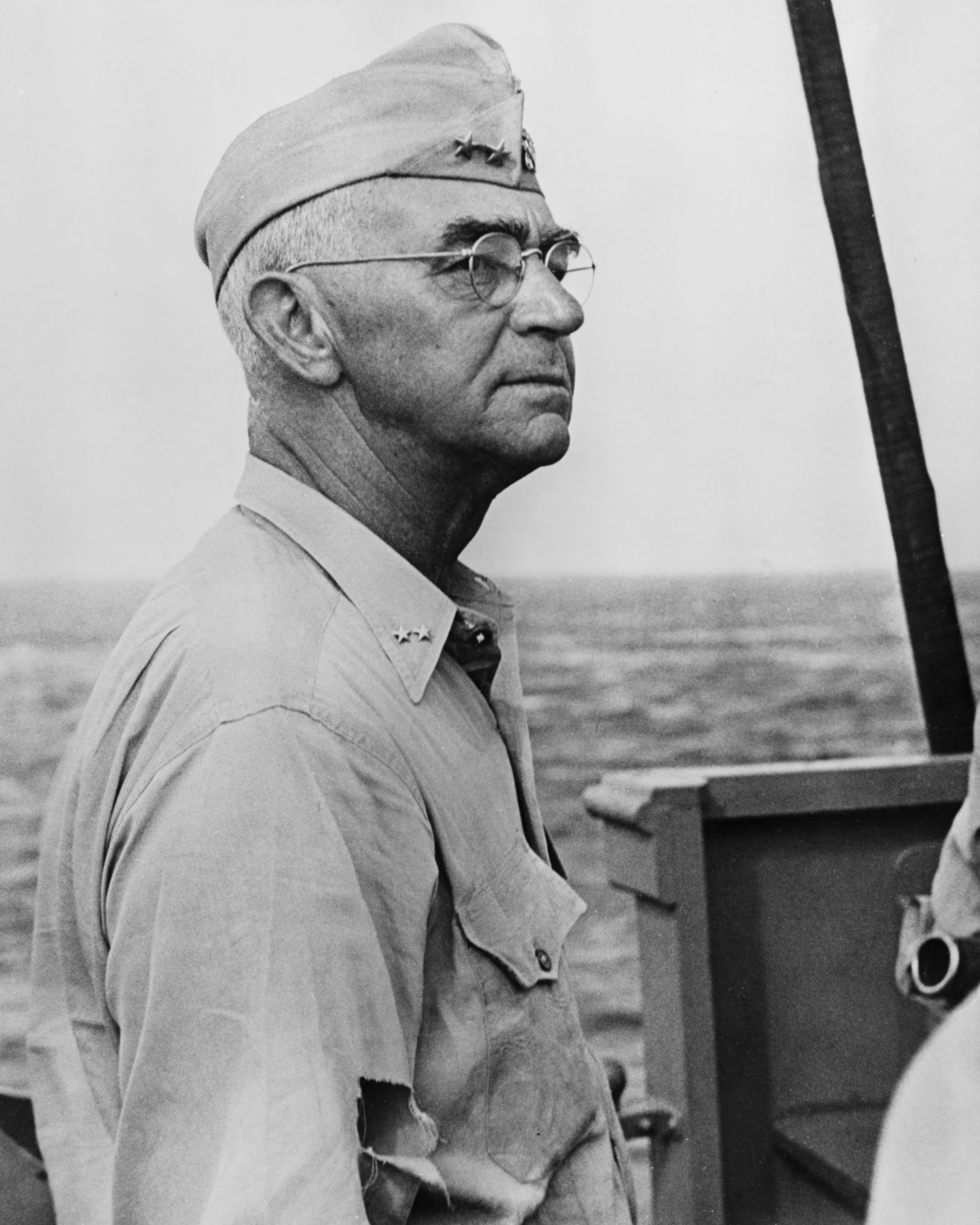
Rear Adm. Richmond Kelly Turner

Ground force commanders

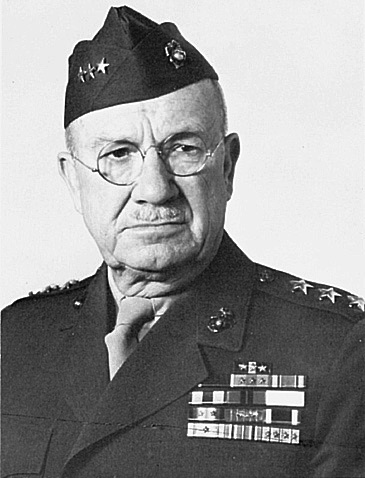
Maj. Gen. Holland M. Smith, USMC

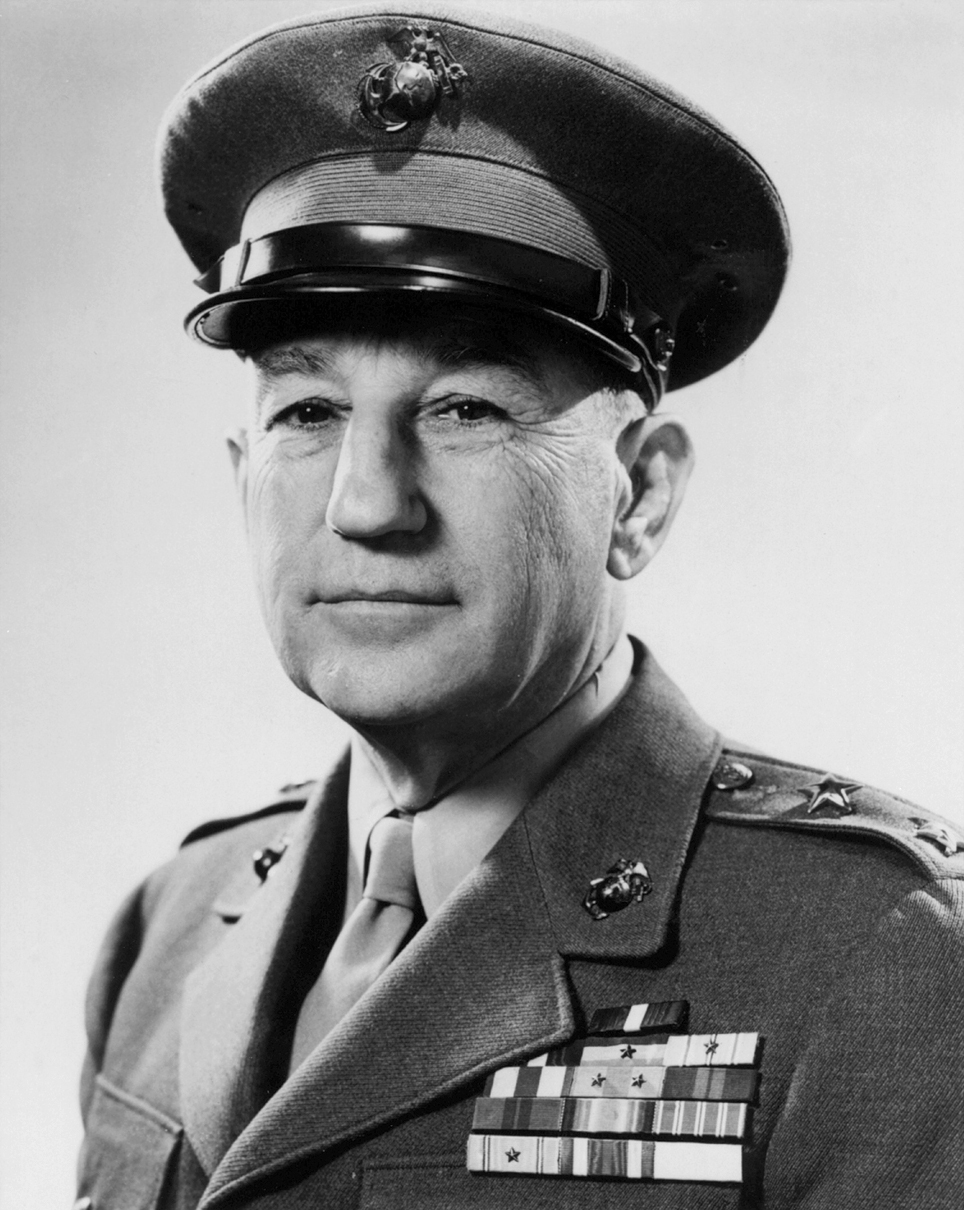
Maj. Gen. Julian C. Smith, USMC

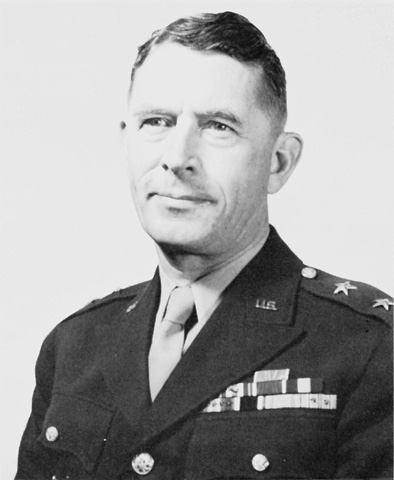
Maj. Gen. Ralph C. Smith, USA

=== Naval ===
The roles of Commander in Chief, Pacific Ocean Areas (CINCPOA) and Commander in Chief, U.S. Pacific Fleet (CINCPAC), were both exercised by Admiral Chester W. Nimitz from his headquarters at Pearl Harbor, Hawaii.

Since the Gilberts and Marshalls lie in the Central Pacific, their capture was the responsibility of the U.S. Fifth Fleet, led by Vice Admiral Raymond A. Spruance from aboard his flagship, heavy cruiser USS Indianapolis (CA-35).

The ships and troops of Operations Galvanic (landings on Tarawa Atoll) and Kourbash (landings on Makin Atoll) were under direct operational command of Rear Admiral Richmond Kelly Turner aboard old battleship USS Pennsylvania (BB-38).

In case Admiral Mineichi Koga attempted to disrupt Fifth Fleet's operations, Spruance was to strip all combat ships not needed to cover the landings, join with the fast carrier forces and engage the Japanese. In the event, Koga's Combined Fleet never stirred from its anchorage at Truk Lagoon in the Carolines.

=== Ground troops ===
V Amphibious Corps (Maj. Gen. Holland M. Smith)

Tarawa: 2nd Marine Division (Maj. Gen. Julian C. Smith)
Makin: 27th Infantry Division (Army) (Maj. Gen. Ralph C. Smith)

Both Admiral Turner and General Holland Smith sailed with the Northern Attack Force even though it was obvious that Tarawa would be the scene of the main ground action. If the Japanese mounted a counterattack, it was most likely to come from the Marshalls since the closest Japanese bases to the Gilberts were located there. Nimitz and Spruance wanted the two highest-ranking officers to sail with the forces that would be the first to encounter any such enemy response. Unbeknownst to the Americans, the Japanese had stripped almost all their naval and air assets from the Marshalls in an attempt to resist the Allied effort in the Central Solomons. Thus, no counterattack materialized.

== Forces afloat ==
=== Carrier Force (Task Force 50) ===
Rear Admiral Charles A. Pownall in fleet carrier Yorktown

==== Carrier Interceptor Group (Task Group 50.1) ====
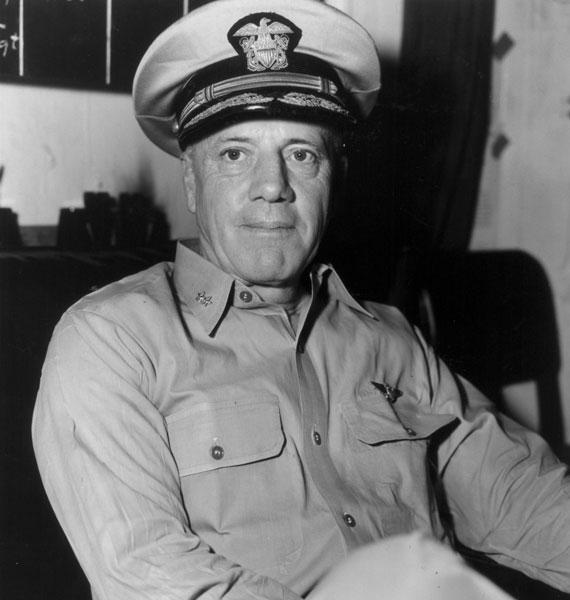
Rear Adm. Charles A. Pownall

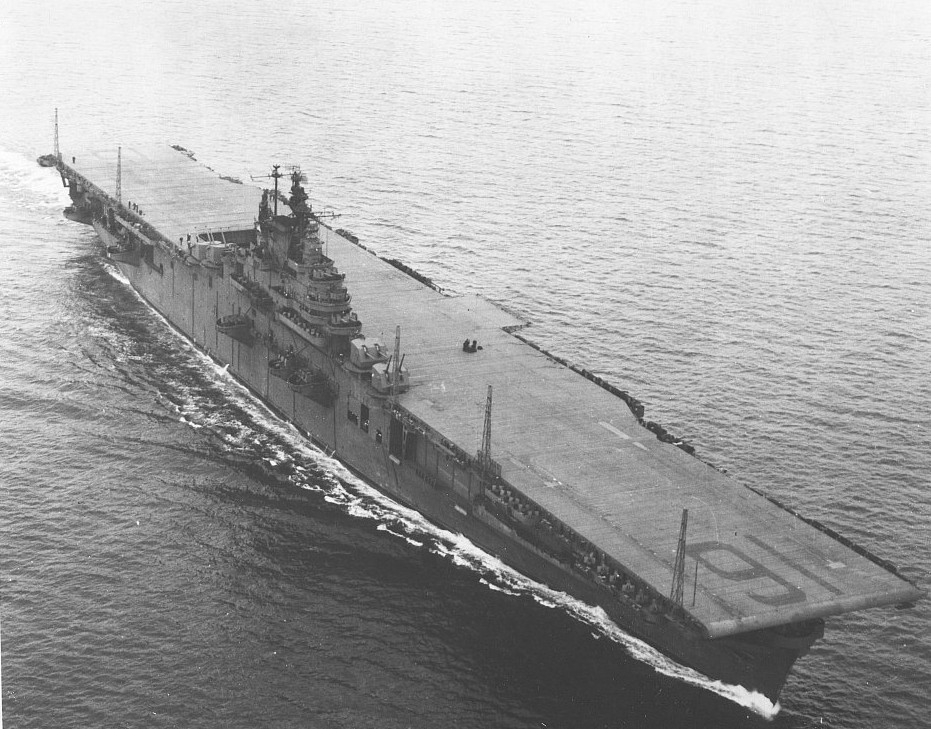
Fleet carrier Lexington underway, February 1944

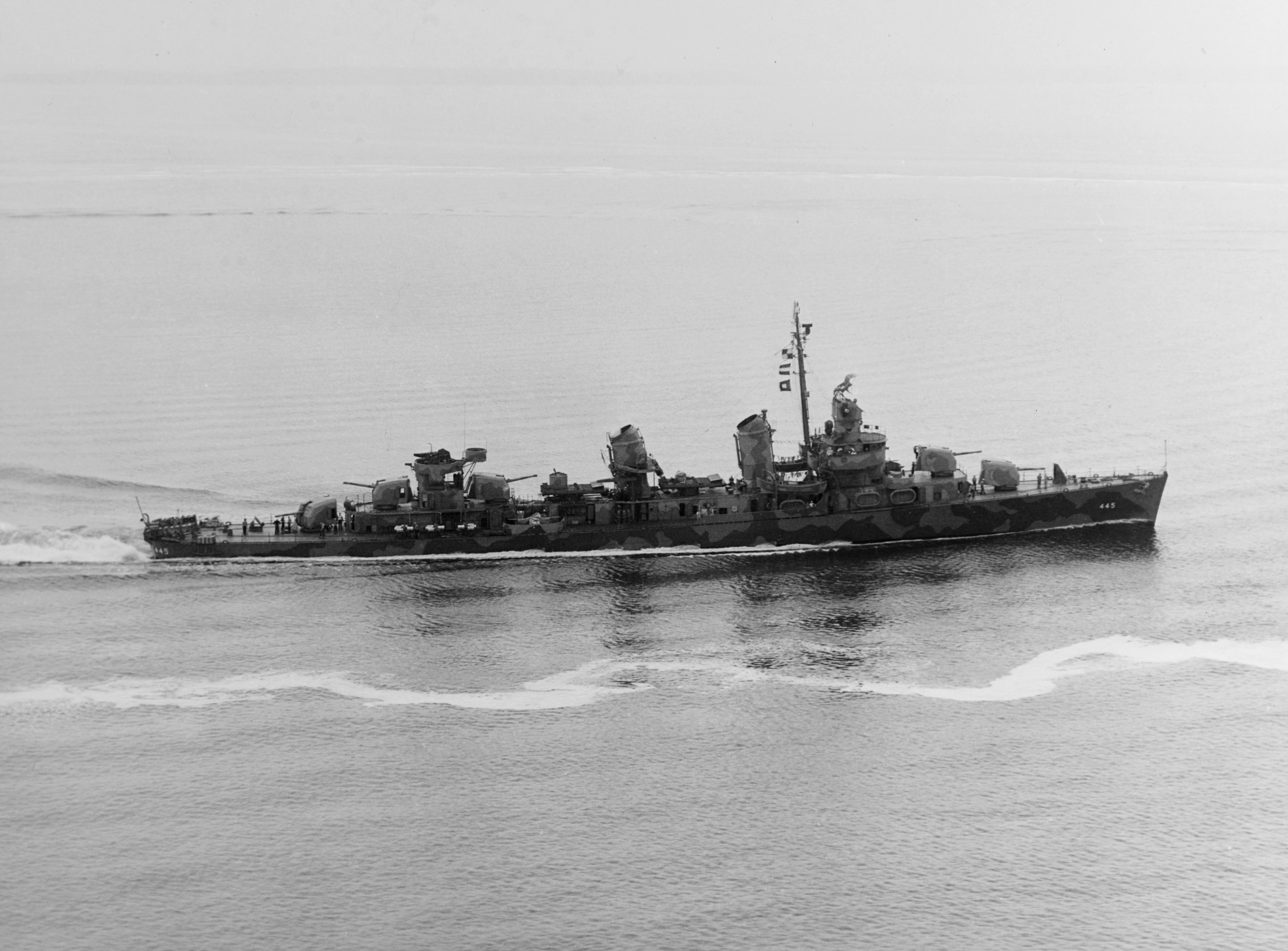
Destroyer Fletcher off New York, 1942

Rear Admiral Pownall in Yorktown

2 fleet carriers

Yorktown (Capt. J. J. Clark)

Air Group 5 (Lt. Cmdr. C. L. Crommelin)

VF-5: 36 Grumman F6F Hellcat fighters
VB-5: 36 Douglas SBD Dauntless dive bombers
VT-5: 18 Grumman TBF Avenger torpedo bombers

Lexington (Capt. F. B. Stump)

Air Group 16 (Lt. Cmdr. E. M. Snowden)

VF-16: 36 Grumman F6F Hellcat fighters
VB-16: 36 Douglas SBD Dauntless dive bombers
VT-16: 18 Grumman TBF Avenger torpedo bombers

1 light carrier

Cowpens (Capt. R. P. McConnell)

Air Group 25 (Lt. R. H. Price)

VF-25: 24 Grumman F6F Hellcat fighters
VF-6: 12 Grumman F6F Hellcat fighters
VC-25: 10 Grumman TBF Avenger torpedo bombers

Battleship Division 6 (Rear Adm. E. W. Hanson)

3 fast battleships

1 North Carolina-class (9 × 16-in. main battery): Washington
2 South Dakota-class (9 × 16-in. main battery): South Dakota, Alabama

Screen (Lr. Cmdr. A. J. Hill)

6 destroyers

All Fletcher-class (5 × 5-in. main battery): La Vallette, Nicholas, Taylor, Charrette, Conner, Izard

==== Northern Carrier Group (Task Group 50.2) ====
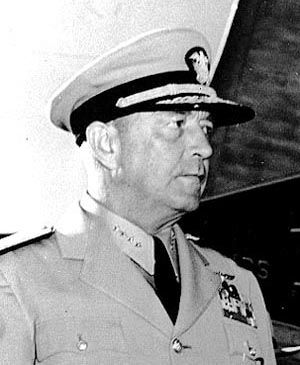
Rear Adm. Arthur W. Radford

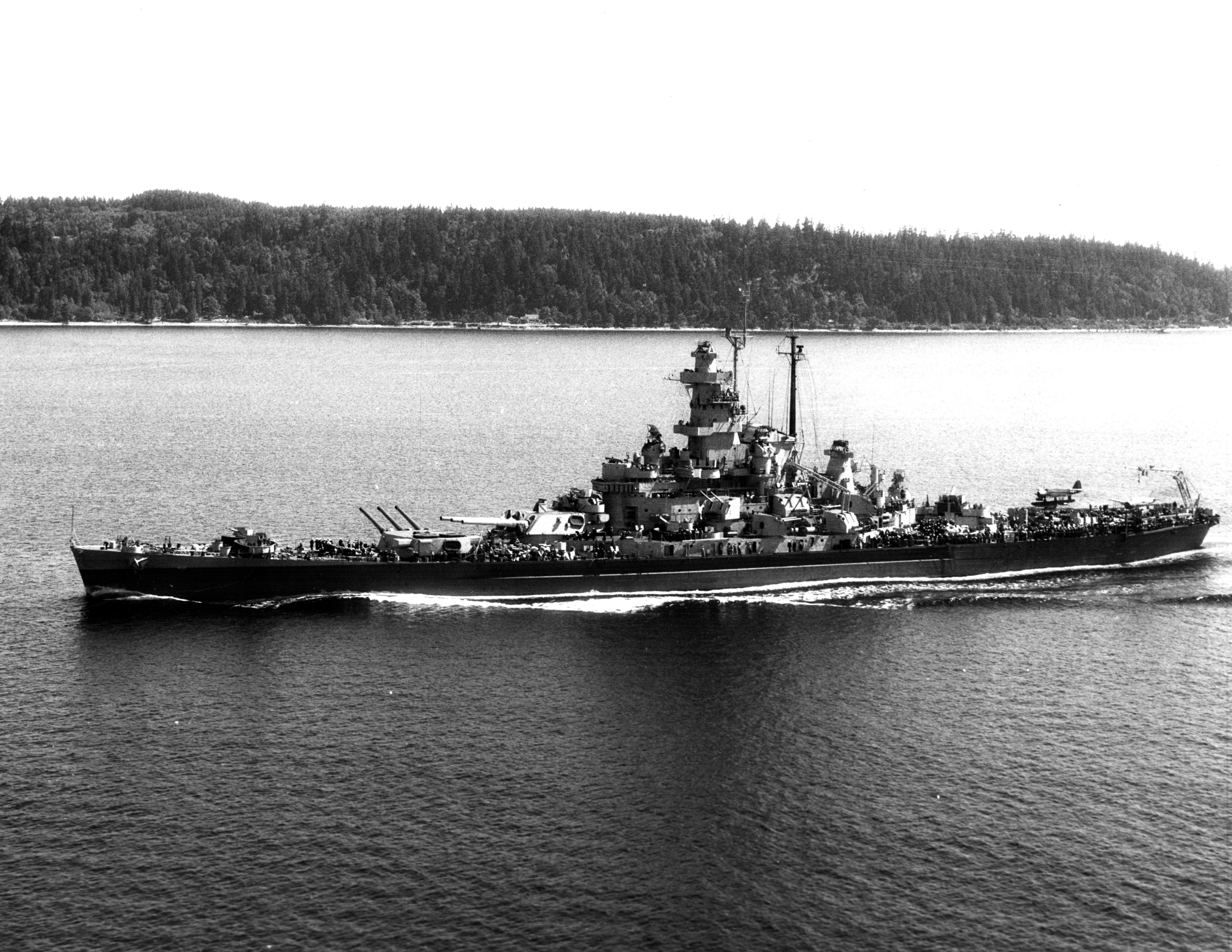
Fast battleship Massachusetts off Point Wilson, Washington, July 1944

Rear Admiral Arthur W. Radford in fleet carrier Enterprise

1 fleet carrier

Enterprise (Capt. S. P. Ginder)

Air Group 6 (Lt. Cmdr. E. H. O'Hare) (killed 26 Nov)

VF-2: 36 Grumman F6F Hellcat fighters
VB-6: 36 Douglas SBD Dauntless dive bombers
VT-6: 18 Grumman TBF Avenger torpedo bombers

2 light carriers

Belleau Wood (Capt. A. M. Pride)

Air Group 24 (Cmdr. R. H. Dale)

VF-24: 26 Grumman F6F Hellcat fighters
VF-6: 12 Grumman F6F Hellcat fighters
VC-22B: 9 Grumman TBF Avenger torpedo bombers

Monterey (Capt. L. T. Hundt)

Air Group 30 (Lt. Cmdr. J. G. Sliney, USNR)

VF-30: 24 Grumman F6F Hellcat fighters
VC-30: 9 Grumman TBF Avenger torpedo bombers

Battleship Division 6 (Rear Adm. G. B. Davis)

3 fast battleships

1 North Carolina-class (9 × 16-in. main battery): North Carolina
2 South Dakota-class (9 × 16-in. main battery): Indiana, Massachusetts

Screen (Cmdr. H. F. Miller)

6 destroyers

All Fletcher-class (5 × 5-in. main battery): Fletcher, Radford, Jenkins, Boyd, Bradford, Brown

==== Southern Carrier Group (Task Group 50.3) ====
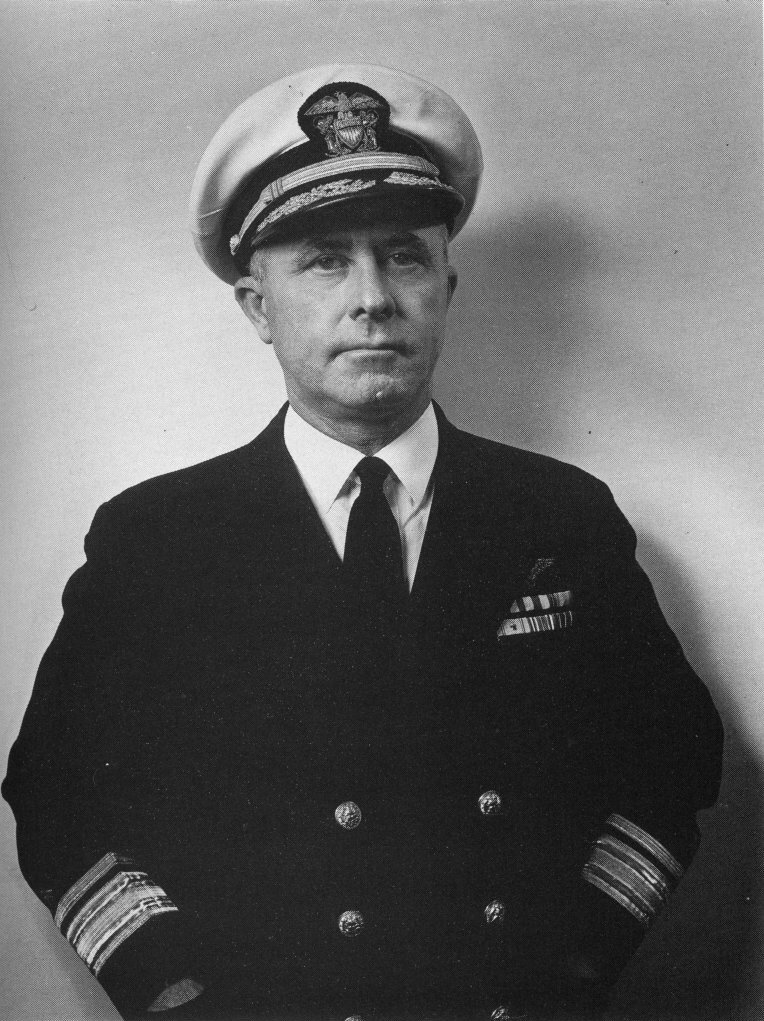
Rear Adm. Alfred E. Montgomery

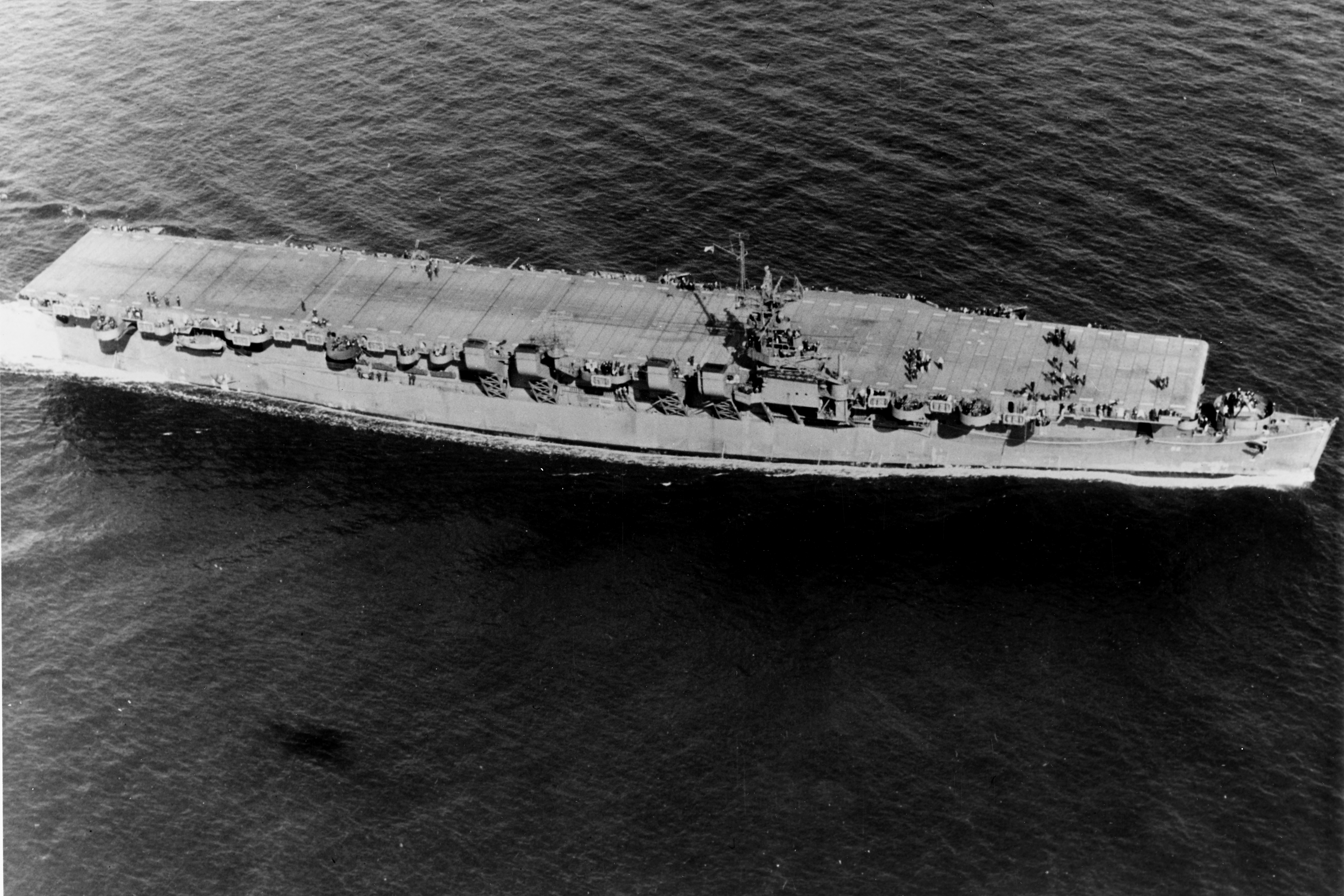
Light carrier Independence underway, early 1943

Rear Admiral Alfred E. Montgomery in fleet carrier Essex

2 fleet carriers

Essex (Capt. D. B. Duncan)

Air Group 9 (Cmdr. J. Raby)

VF-9: 36 Grumman F6F Hellcat fighters
VB-9: 36 Douglas SBD Dauntless dive bombers
VT-9: 18 Grumman TBF Avenger torpedo bombers

Bunker Hill (Capt. J. J. Ballentine)

Air Group 17 (Cmdr. M. P. Bagdanovitch)

VF-18: 36 Grumman F6F Hellcat fighters
VB-17: 32 Curtiss SB2C Helldiver dive bombers

1 light carrier

Independence (Capt. R. L. Johnson)

Air Group 22 (Cmdr. J. M. Peters)

VF-22: 16 Grumman F6F Hellcat fighters
VF-6: 12 Grumman F6F Hellcat fighters
VC-22: 9 Grumman TBF Avenger torpedo bombers

Cruiser Division 5 (Rear Adm. E. G. Small):

3 heavy cruisers

2 Pensacola-class (10 × 8-in. main battery): Pensacola, Salt Lake City
1 Northampton-class (9 × 8-in. main battery): Chester

1 anti-aircraft light cruiser

1 Atlanta-class (12 × 5-in. main battery) (Note: These cruisers were intended as destroyer leaders when designed. After the first two to be used in this role, Atlanta and Juneau, were lost at the Naval Battle of Guadalcanal, this mission was abandoned and the anti-aircraft mission adopted.): Oakland

Screen (Capt. J. T. Bottom):

5 destroyers

All Fletcher-class (5 × 5-in. main battery): Erben, Hale, Bullard, Kidd, Chauncey

==== Relief Carrier Group (Task Group 50.4) ====
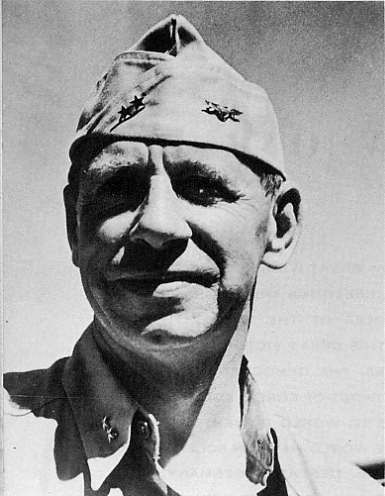
Rear Adm. Frederick C. Sherman

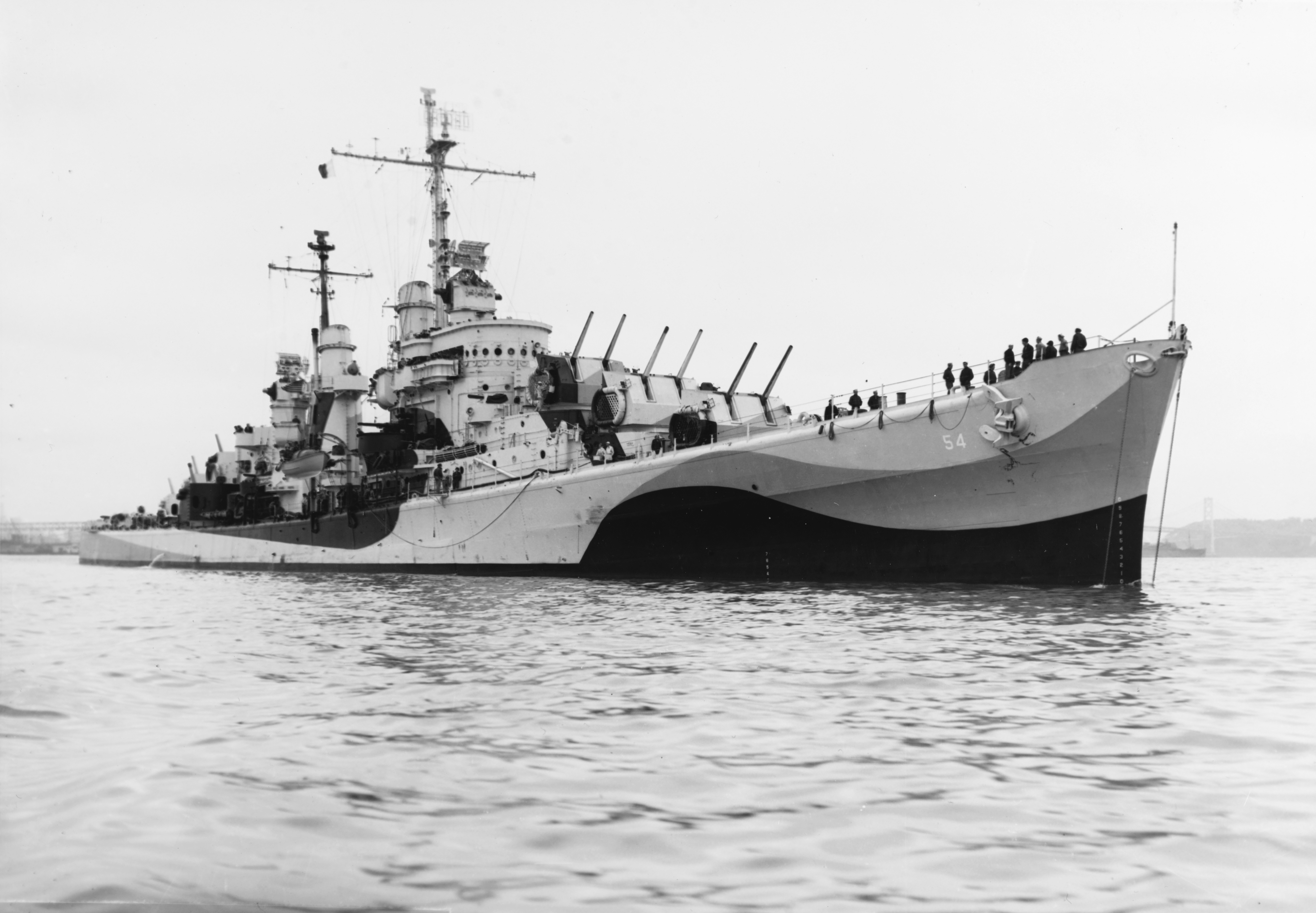
Anti-aircraft light cruiser San Juan off San Francisco, October 1944

Rear Admiral Frederick C. Sherman in fleet carrier Saratoga

1 fleet carrier

Saratoga (Capt. J. H. Cassady)

Air Group 3 (Cmdr. H. H. Caldwell)

VF-12: 37 Grumman F6F Hellcat fighters
VB-12: 24 Douglas SBD Dauntless dive bombers
VT-12: 18 Grumman TBF Avenger torpedo bombers

1 light carrier

Princeton (Capt. G. R. Henderson)

Air Group 23 (Lt. Cmdr. H. L. Miller)

VF-23: 24 Grumman F6F Hellcat fighters
VT-23: 9 Grumman TBF Avenger torpedo bombers

Cruiser Division 2 (Rear Adm. L. J. Wiltse)

2 anti-aircraft light cruisers

Both Atlanta-class (12 × 5-in. main battery): San Diego, San Juan

Screen

4 destroyers

3 Benham-class (4 × 5-in. main battery): Stack, Sterett, Wilson
1 Benson-class (4 × 5-in. main battery): Edwards

=== Northern Attack Force (Makin) (Task Group 52) ===
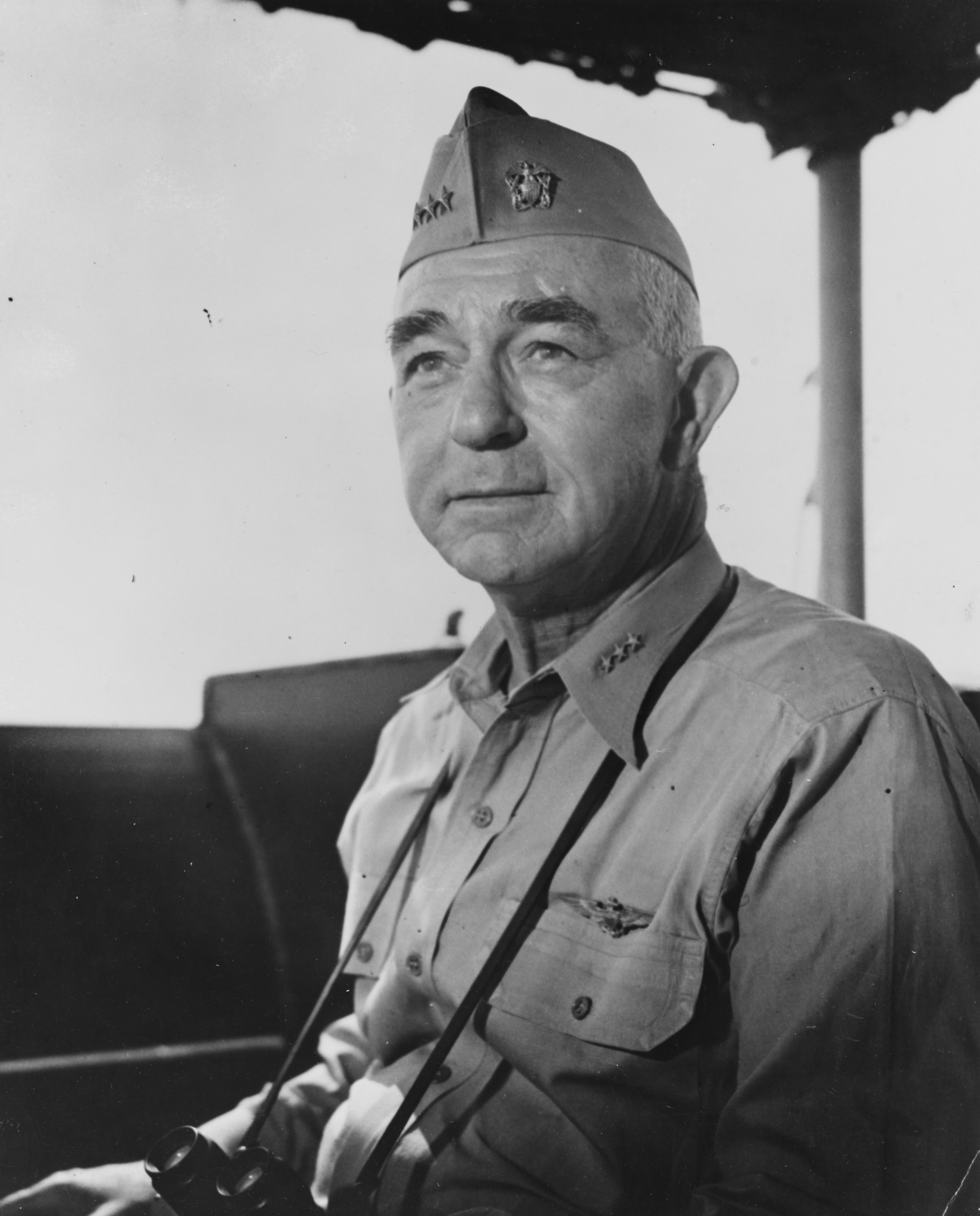
Richmond Kelly Turner as a vice admiral

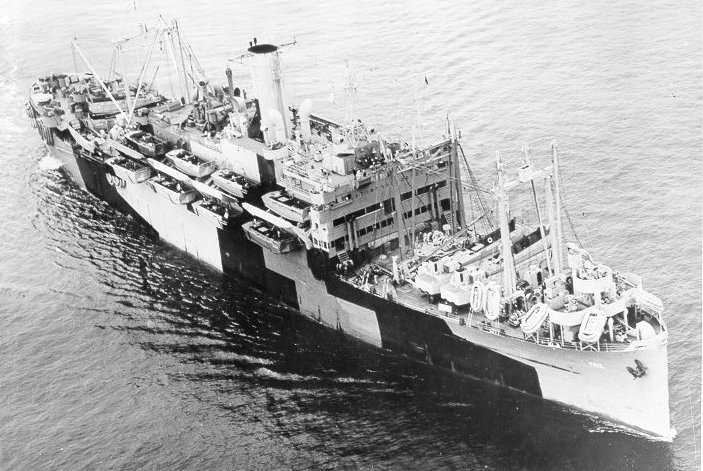
Attack transport Leonard Wood off California, April 1944

Rear Admiral Richmond Kelly Turner in old battleship USS Pennsylvania (BB-38)

==== Transport Group (Task Group 52.1) ====
Captain D. W. Loomis
Embarking 165th Regimental Combat Team and 105th Battalion Landing Team
of the 27th Infantry Division

4 attack transports: Neville, Leonard Wood, Calvert, Pierce
1 attack cargo ship: Alcyone
1 landing ship dock: Belle Grove
Screen

4 destroyers

2 Fletcher-class (4 × 5-in. main battery): Kimberly, Burns
1 Farragut-class (4 × 5-in. main battery): Dale
1 Sims-class (4 × 5-in. main battery): Mustin

==== Fire Support Group (Task Group 52.2) ====
Rear Admiral Robert M. Griffin in battleship USS New Mexico (BB-40)

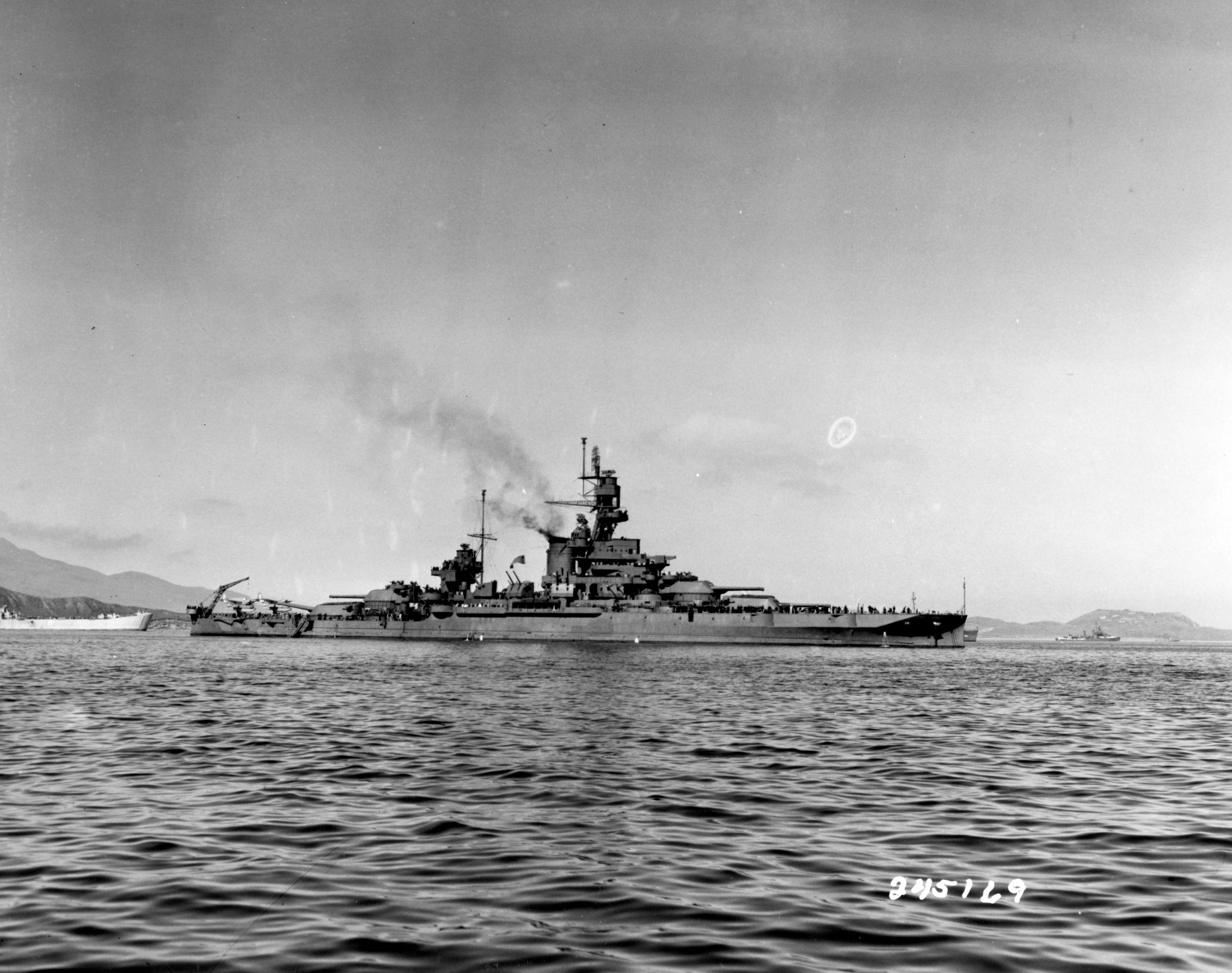
Old battleship Pennsylvania off Alaska, 1943

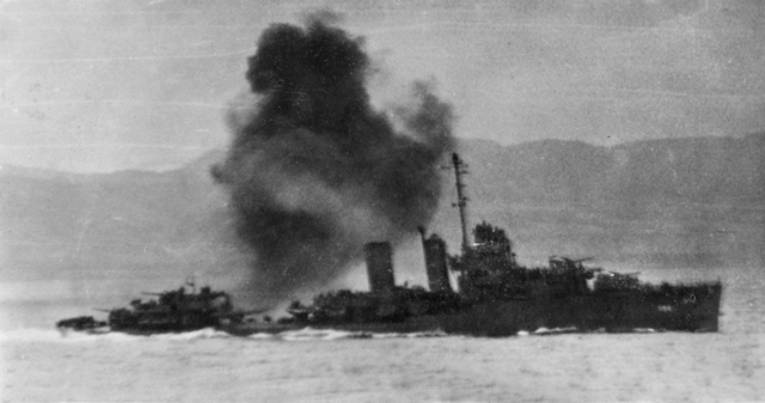
Farragut class destroyer off Guadalcanal, 1942

Unit 1

2 old battleships

1 Pennsylvania-class (12 × 14-in. main battery): Pennsylvania
1 New Mexico-class (12 × 14-in. main battery): New Mexico

2 heavy cruisers

Both New Orleans-class (9 × 8-in. main battery): Minneapolis, San Francisco

2 destroyers

Both Farragut-class (4 × 5-in. main battery): Dewey, Hull

Unit 2

2 old battleships

Both New Mexico-class (12 × 14-in. main battery): Mississippi, Idaho

2 heavy cruisers

1 Baltimore-class (9 × 8-in. main battery): Baltimore
1 New Orleans-class (9 × 8-in. main battery): New Orleans

2 destroyers

Both Gridley-class (4 × 5-in. main battery): Gridley, Maury

Unit 3

2 destroyers

1 Porter-class (8 × 5-in. main battery): Phelps
1 Farragut-class (4 × 5-in. main battery): MacDonough

==== Air Support Group (Task Group 52.3) ====
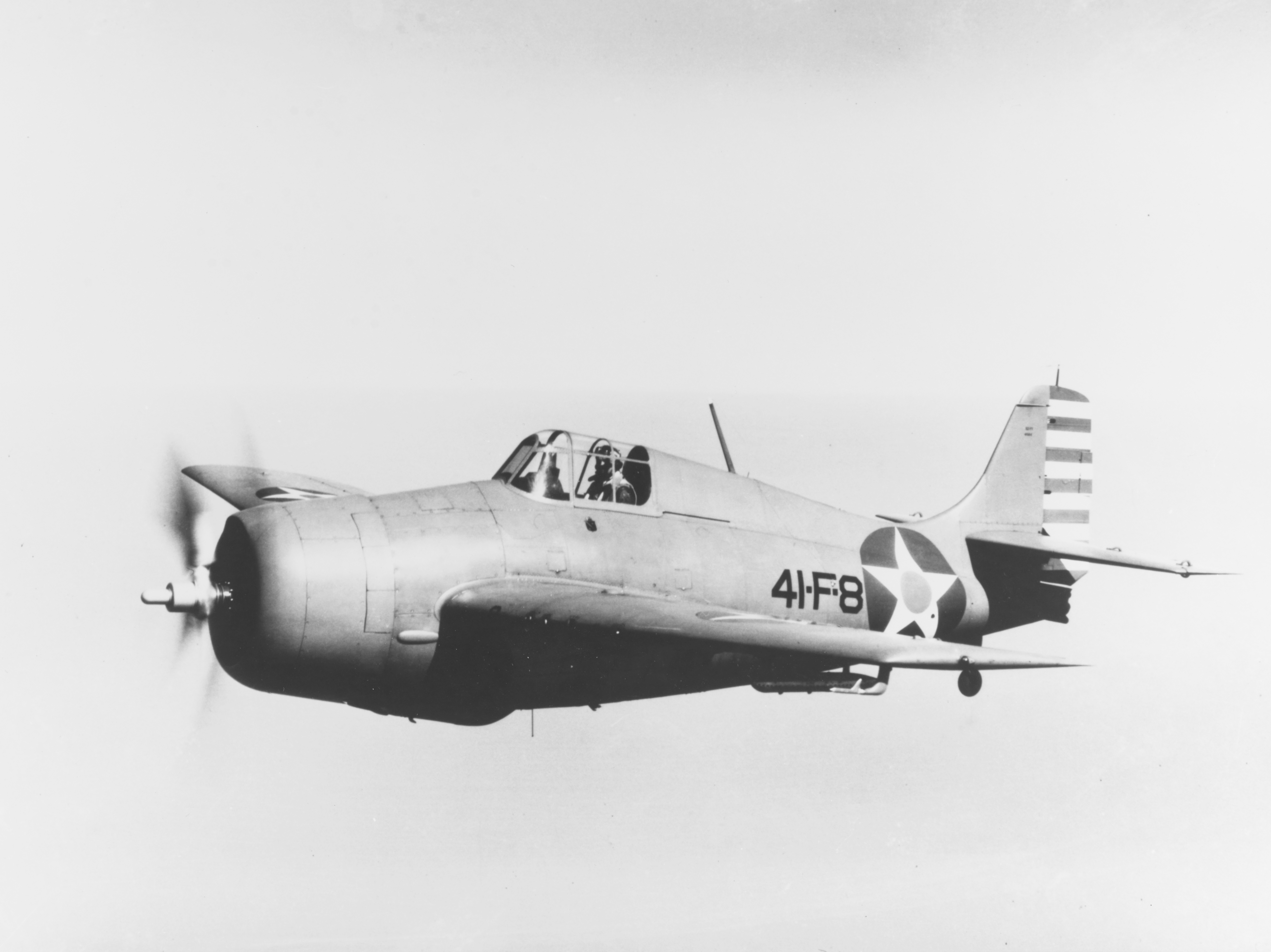
Grumman F4F Wildcat fighter

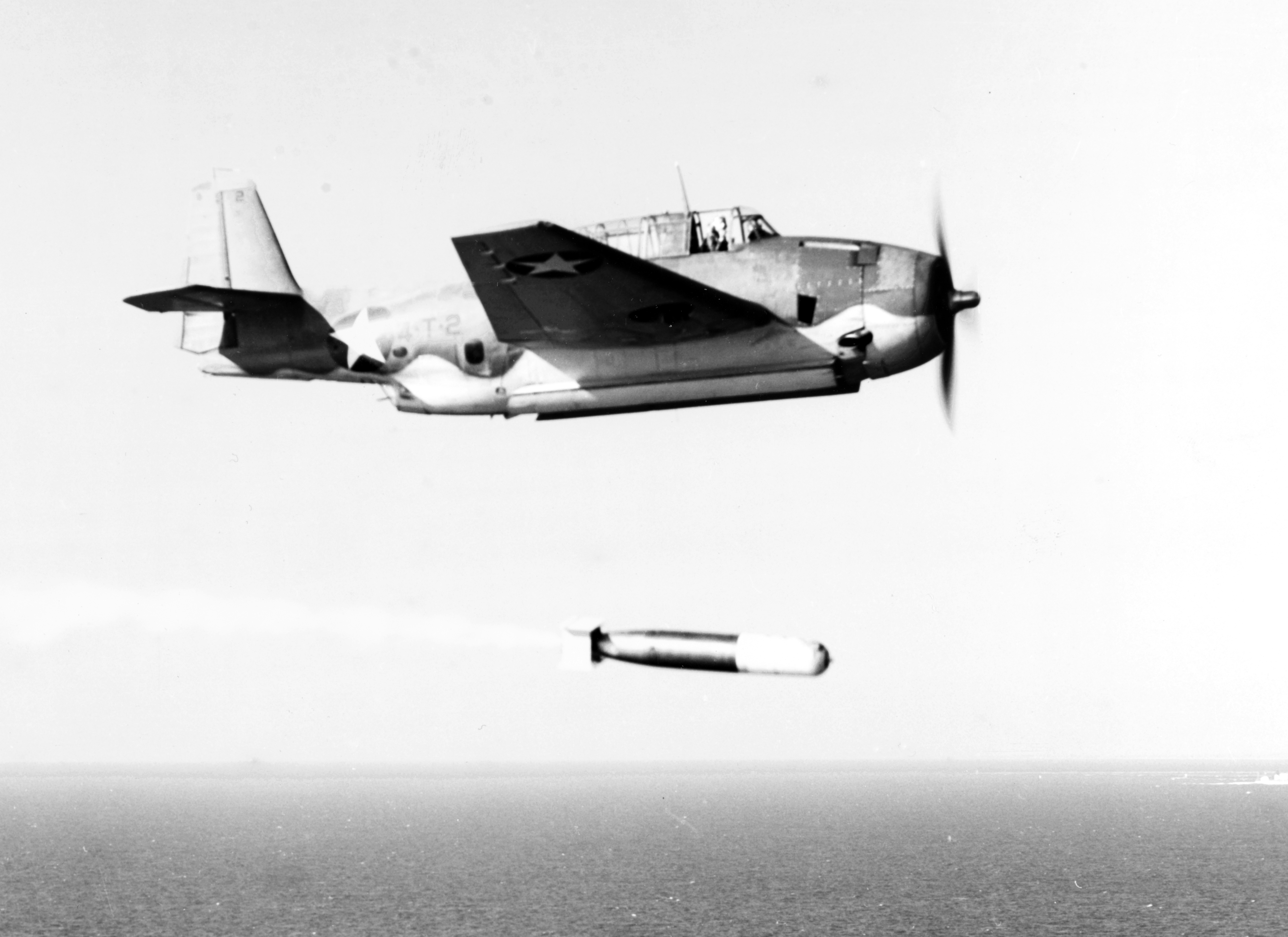
Grumman TBF Avenger torpedo bomber

Rear Admiral Henry M. Mullinnix (killed 24 Nov) in escort carrier Liscome Bay

3 escort carriers

Liscome Bay (sunk by submarine 24 Nov) (Capt. I. D. Wiltsie killed 24 Nov)

Air Group (Lt. Cmdr. M. U. Beebe)

16 Grumman FM-1 Wildcat fighters
12 TBM Avenger torpedo bombers

Coral Sea (Capt. H. W. Taylor)

Air Group (Lt. Cmdr. J. J. Lynch)

16 Grumman FM-1 Wildcat fighters
12 Grumman TBF Avenger torpedo bombers

Corregidor (Capt. R. L. Bowman)

Air Group (Lt. Cmdr. G. M. Clifford)

16 Grumman FM-1 Wildcat fighters
12 Grumman TBF Avenger torpedo bombers

Screen

4 destroyers

2 Sims-class (4 × 5-in. main battery): Hughes, Morris
2 Fletcher-class (5 × 5-in. main battery): Hoel, Franks

1 minesweeper

1 Auk-class (1 × 3-in. main battery): Revenge

==== Makin LST Group No. 1 (Task Group 54.4) ====
Commander A. M. Hurst

3 landing ship tanks: 31, 78, 178, each carrying an LCT
1 Farragut-class destroyer (4 × 5-in. main battery): Dale

=== TF 53 Southern Attack Force (Tarawa) ===
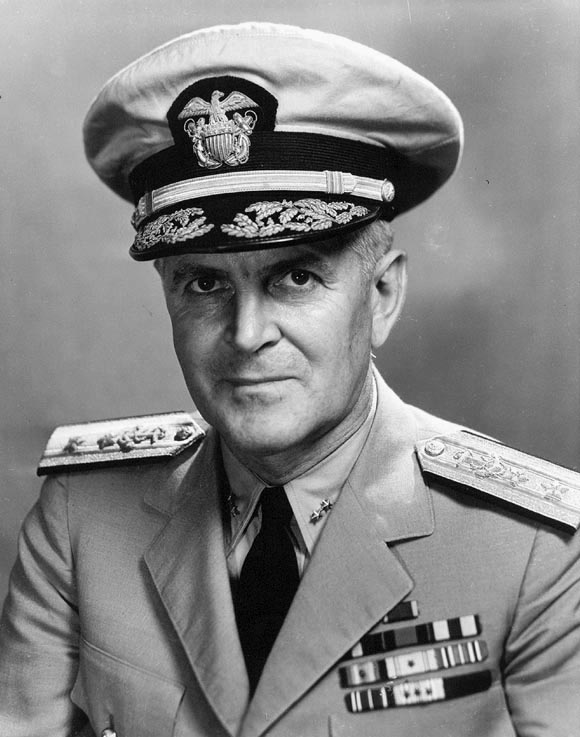
Rear Adm. Harry W. Hill

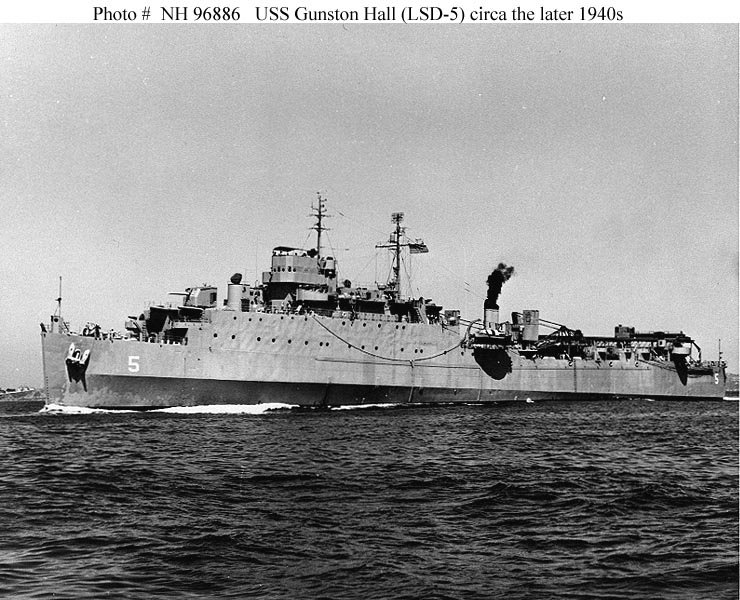
Landing ship dock

Rear Admiral Harry W. Hill in old battleship USS Maryland (BB-46)

==== Transport Group (Task Group 53.1) ====
Captain H. B. Knowles in attack transport Monrovia
Embarking 2nd Marine Division, reinforced

Transport Division 4 (Capt. J. B. McGovern):

5 attack transports: Zeilin, Heywood, William P. Biddle, Harry Lee, Arthur Middleton

Transport Division 6 (Capt. T. B. Brittain):

4 attack transports: Harris, Feland, J. Franklin Bell, Ormsby

Transport Division 18 (Capt. Knowles):

3 attack transports: Doyen, Monrovia, Sheridan
3 attack cargo ships: Bellatrix, Thuban, Virgo
1 landing ship dock: Ashland
1 transport: La Salle

Screen (Capt. E. M. Thompson):

7 destroyers

All Fletcher-class (5 × 5-in. main battery): Sigsbee, Hazelwood, Heermann, Harrison, John Rodgers, McKee, Murray

==== Minesweeper Group (Task Group 53.2) ====
Lieutenant Commander H. R. Peirce

2 minesweepers

Both Auk-class (1 × 3-in. main battery): Pursuit, Requisite

==== Fire Support Group (Task Group 53.4) ====
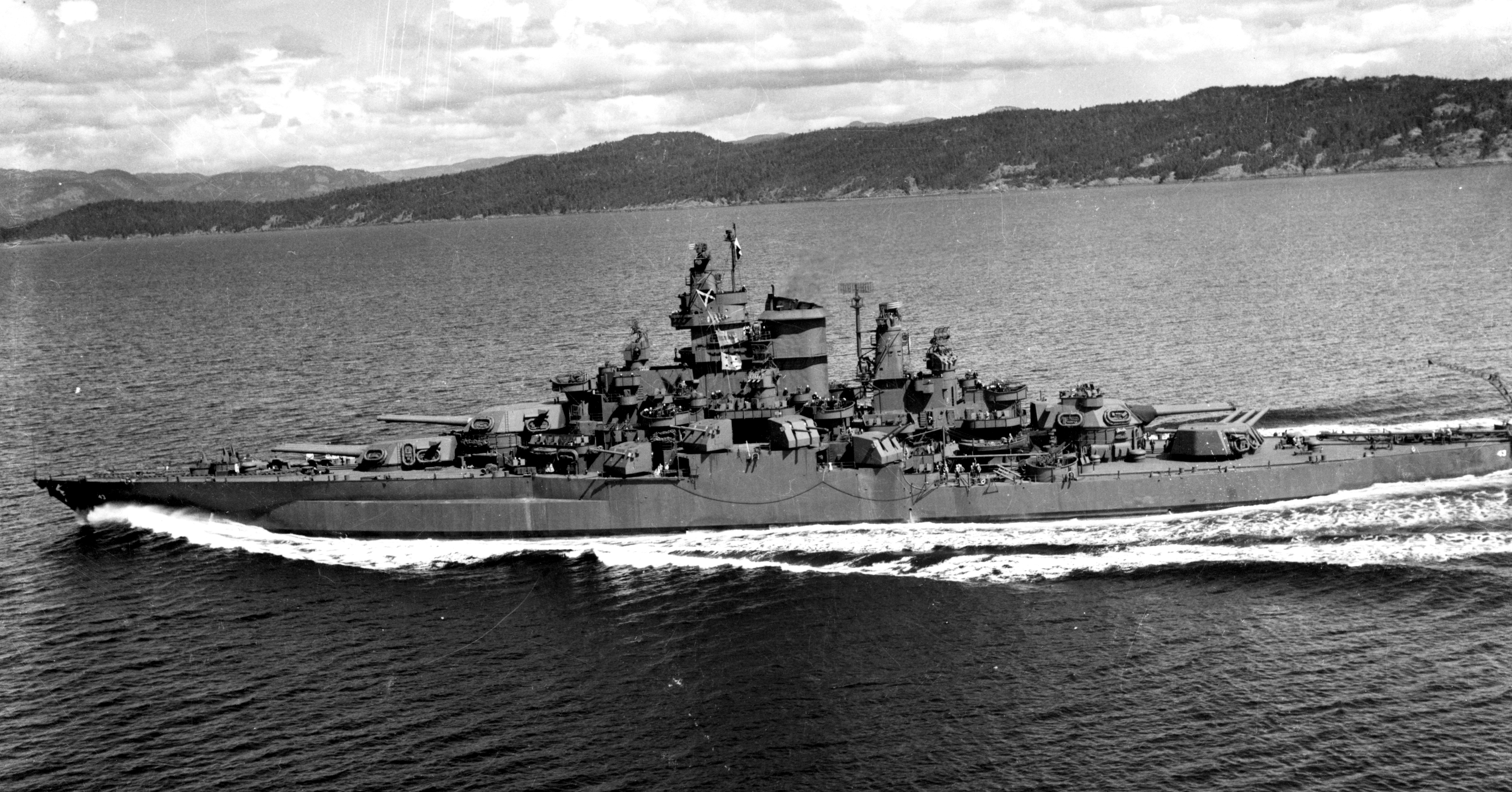
Old battleship Tennessee in Puget Sound, 1943

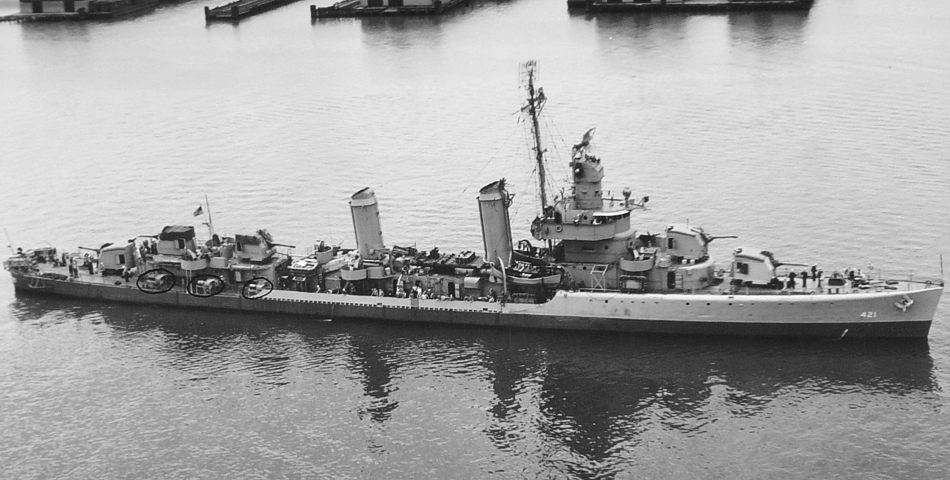
Benson-class destroyer

Rear Admiral Howard F. Kingman

Section 1

1 Tennessee-class old battleship (12 × 14-in. main battery): Tennessee
1 Cleveland-class light cruiser (12 × 6-in. main battery): Mobile
2 Benson-class destroyers (5 × 5-in. main battery): Bailey, Frazier

Section 2

1 Colorado-class old battleship (8 × 16-in. main battery): Maryland
1 Cleveland-class light cruiser (12 × 6-in. main battery): Santa Fe
2 Benson-class destroyers (5 × 5-in. main battery): Meade, Gansevoort

Section 3

1 Colorado-class old battleship (8 × 16-in. main battery): Colorado
1 Portland-class heavy cruiser (9 × 8-in. main battery): Portland
2 Sims-class destroyers (5 × 5-in. main battery): Anderson, Russell

Section 4

2 Fletcher-class destroyers (5 × 5-in. main battery): Ringgold, Dashiell

Section 5

1 Portland-class heavy cruiser (9 × 8-in. main battery): Indianapolis
1 Fletcher-class destroyer (5 × 5-in. main battery): Schroeder

==== Air Support Group (Task Group 53.6) ====
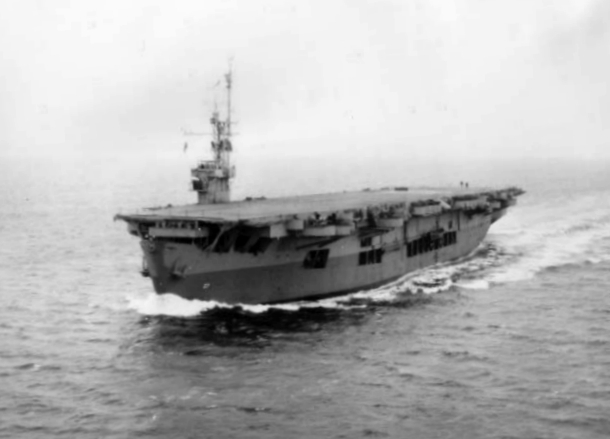
Escort carrier Suwannee underway

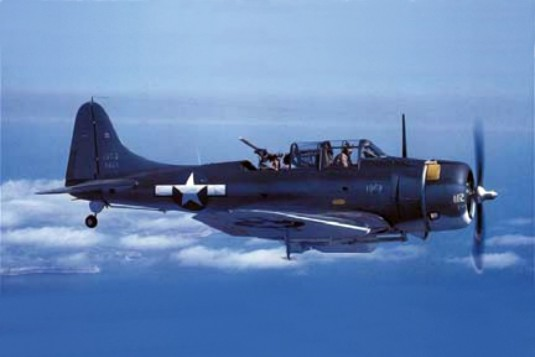
Douglas SBD Dauntless dive bomber

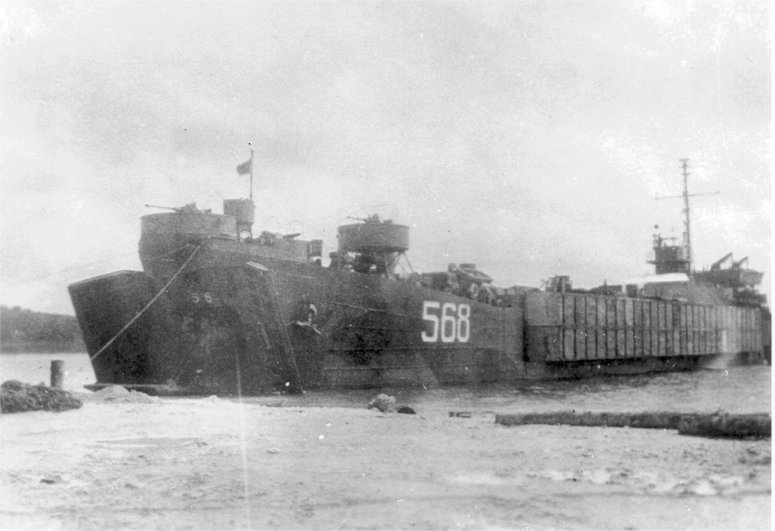
Landing ship tank

Rear Admiral V. H. Ragsdale

5 escort carriers

Sangamon (Capt. E. P. Moore)

12 Grumman F6F Hellcat fighters
9 Douglas SBD Dauntless dive bombers
9 Grumman TBF Avenger torpedo bombers

Suwanee (Capt. F. W. McMahon)

12 Grumman F6F Hellcat fighters
9 Douglas SBD Dauntless dive bombers
9 Grumman TBF Avenger torpedo bombers

Chenango (Capt. D. Ketcham)

12 Grumman F6F Hellcat fighters
9 Douglas SBD Dauntless dive bombers
9 Grumman TBF Avenger torpedo bombers

Nassau (Capt. S. J. Michael)

12 Grumman F6F Hellcat fighters

Barnes (Capt. G. A. Dussault)

12 Grumman F6F Hellcat fighters

Screen

5 destroyers

2 Fletcher-class (5 × 5-in. main battery): Cowell, Cotten
3 Farragut-class (4 × 5-in. main battery): Farragut, Monaghan, Aylwin

==== Tarawa LST Group No. 1 (Task Group 54.5) ====
Lieutenant Commander R. M. Pits

3 landing ship tanks: 34, 242, 243, each carrying an LCT
1 Benson-class destroyer (4 ×x 5-in. main battery): Bancroft

== See also ==
Orders of battle involving United States Marine forces in the Pacific Theatre of World War II:

- Battle of Guadalcanal order of battle
- Battle of Saipan order of battle
- Guam (1944) order of battle
- Battle of Leyte opposing forces
- Battle of Peleliu opposing forces
- Battle of Iwo Jima order of battle
- Okinawa ground order of battle
  - Naval Base Tarawa

== Bibliography ==
- Morison, Samuel Eliot (1951). Aleutians, Gilberts and Marshalls: June 1942 April 1944. History of United States Naval Operations in World War II. Vol. VII. Boston: Little, Brown and Co. ISBN 978-0-316-58307-7.
- Wright, Derrick (2004). Tarawa 1943: The Turning of the Tide. Oxford: Osprey Publishing Ltd. ISBN 0-275-98271-8.
