= Crescent City-class attack transport =

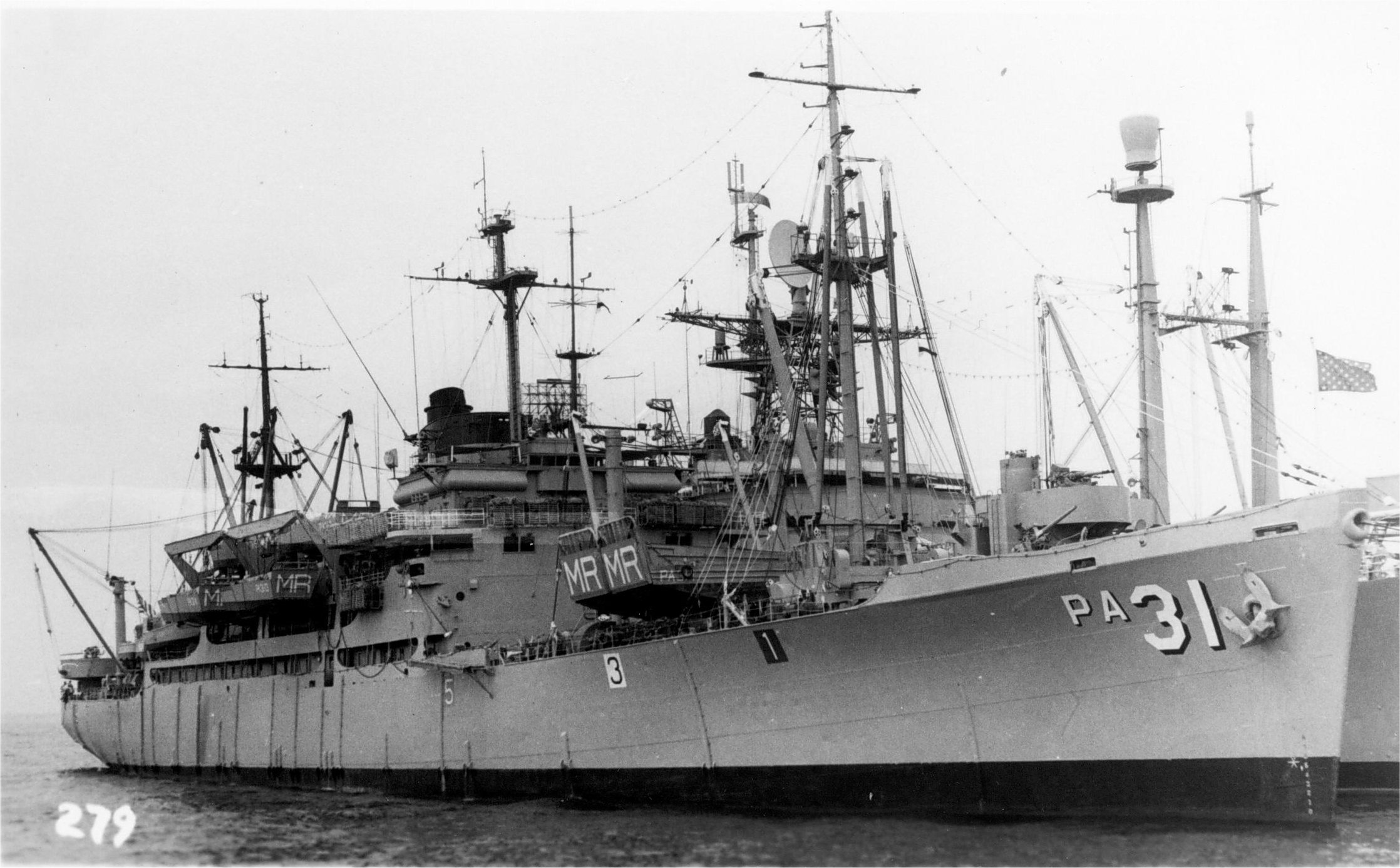
- USS Monrovia (APA-31), a ship of the Crescent City class

Class overview
- Name: Crescent City-class
- Builders: Bethlehem Steel
- Operators: United States Navy
- Preceded by: Harry Lee class
- Succeeded by: President Jackson class
- In commission: 10 Oct 1941 – 30 Apr 1948; 18 Oct 1950 - 31 Oct 1968
- Completed: 4

General characteristics
- Class & type: Crescent City-class attack transport
- Displacement: 7,300 tons (light), 13,910 tons (full)
- Length: 459 ft 3 in (139.98 m)
- Beam: 63 ft (19 m)
- Draft: 24 ft (7.3 m)
- Propulsion: 1 × General Electric geared drive turbine, 2 × Foster-Wheeler D-type boilers, 1 × propeller, designed shaft horsepower 6,000
- Speed: 16 - 16.5 knots
- Capacity: Troops: Officer 83-91 Enlisted 1,465-1475 Cargo: 150,000 cu ft, 2,700 tons
- Complement: 42-46 officers, 478 enlisted
- Armament: 2 × 5"/38 caliber dual-purpose gun mounts, 2 × Bofors 40 mm L/60 gun mounts, 4 × twin 20mm gun, 12 - 18 × 20 mm single gun mounts.
- Notes: MCV hull type C2-S-B1

The Crescent City-class attack transport was a class of U.S. Navy attack transports that saw service in World War II and the Korean War. There were four ships in the class: USS Crescent City, USS Charles Carroll, USS Monrovia, and USS Calvert.

Like all attack transports, the purpose of the Crescent City ships was to transport troops and their equipment to foreign shores in order to execute amphibious invasions using an array of smaller assault boats integral to the attack transport itself. Also like all the attack transports, the class was armed with antiaircraft weaponry to protect itself and its cargo of troops from air attack in the battle zone.

== Class history ==
The Crescent City class began as a class of Navy transport ships (classification AP). Like many other transports, they were redesignated attack transports (APA) on 1 February 1943, the date on which the Navy formalized its separate classification of transport vessels into ordinary transports and attack transports. Unlike many other classes of attack transport, there was no consistent naming convention for these vessels, with individual ships being named after cities, national heroes, or counties of the United States.

The four ships of the Crescent City class were based on the Maritime Commission's ubiquitous Type C3 merchant/auxiliary hull (specifically, the C3-P or C3-Delta types). These were pre-war merchant ship hull types which had been specifically designed with prospective Naval auxiliary service in mind.

All four ships were laid down by Bethlehem Steel at their Sparrow's Point shipyard, but the lead ship, the eponymous Crescent City was launched almost two years before the others, in February 1940. The remaining three were launched between March and September 1942. The commissioning dates were not so far apart though, since Crescent City had to undergo several months converting to an attack transport before she was ready to serve in October '41. The rest were commissioned from August to December '42. The build time for these ships, from laying down to commission, appears to have been about nine months - relatively fast for the C3 type.

The Crescent City class ships were notable for their variety of armament - no two ships had the same configuration. The ships were fitted out with either three or four 3"/50 caliber guns but the last two also got one 5"/38 caliber gun - a superior weapon which had proven its effectiveness in the antiaircraft role and which all later classes of APA received. The remainder of the weaponry was made up of an assortment of 40 mm and 20 mm guns.

The ships had a moderate troop capacity of around 1,200 to 1,500 men, and a useful cargo capacity of 2,300 to 2,700 tons.

=== In service ===
The last three ships in the class saw service in both the Mediterranean and Pacific Theatres, with one, Charles Carroll, also participating in the Normandy landings in France. Crescent City, the lead ship and first to be commissioned, spent the entirety of the war in the Pacific Theatre, where she accumulated an impressive ten battle stars.

Immediately after the end of the war, the ships were engaged in the redeployment of troops for occupation duties in Japan and its former territories in China and Korea, before taking part in Operation Magic Carpet, the massive sealift organized to return demobilizing troops home to the United States. The ships were then decommissioned between 1946 and 1948, but two, Monrovia and Calvert, were recommissioned in 1950 for the Korean War, where Calvert earned an additional two battle stars to add to the eight received for her World War II service.

Subsequently, the ships were decommissioned one by one, from 1968 to 1977, but Crescent City was given a new lease of life as a training ship for the California Maritime Academy from 1971 to 1995. She was revived again as Artship from 1999 to 2004, but has since joined her sister ships in the scrapyard.

The Crescent City class as a whole earned an impressive 33 battle stars and two Navy Unit Commendations for their military service.
