= USS Charles Carroll =

1942 Crescent City-class attack transport

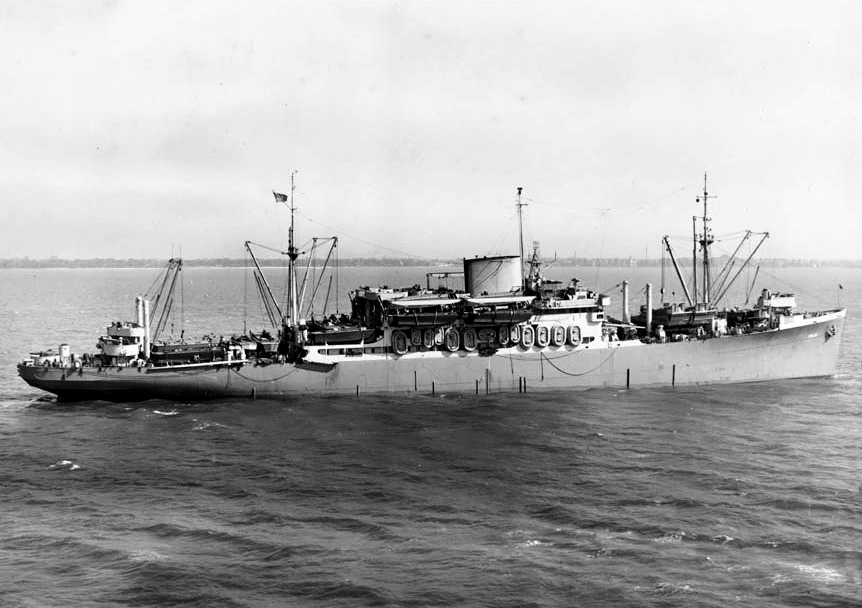
- USS Charles Carroll (APA-28) underway November 1943, location unknown

History

United States
- Name: USS Charles Carroll (APA-28)
- Namesake: Charles Carroll, a signatory of the Declaration of Independence
- Builder: Bethlehem Steel
- Launched: 24 March 1942
- Sponsored by: Mrs C. W. Flesher
- Christened: Deluruguay
- Acquired: 13 August 1942
- Commissioned: 13 August 1942
- Decommissioned: 30 April 1948
- Renamed: USS Charles Carroll
- Reclassified: AP-58 to APA-28, 1 February 1943
- Stricken: 27 December 1946
- Identification: MCV Hull Type C3P-Delta, MCV Hull No. 150
- Honours and awards: Six battle stars for World War II service
- Fate: Sold, 1 April 1977, broken for scrap

General characteristics
- Class & type: Crescent City class attack transport
- Displacement: 8,409 tons (lt), 14,247 t.(fl)
- Length: 491 ft
- Beam: 65 ft 6 in
- Draft: 25 ft 8 in
- Propulsion: 1 x General Electric geared drive turbine, 2 x boilers, designed shaft horsepower 7,800
- Speed: 16 knots
- Capacity: Troops: 67 Officers, 1,255 Enlisted; Cargo: 130,000 cu ft, 2,700 tons
- Complement: Officers 58, Enlisted 554
- Armament: 4 x 3"/50 caliber dual-purpose gun mounts, 2 x twin Bofors 40mm gun mounts, 18 x single20mm gun mounts.

USS Charles Carroll (APA-28) was a Crescent City-class attack transport that served with the US Navy during World War II.

Charles Carroll was named after a signatory to the American Declaration of Independence. Initially classified a transport ship, AP-58, the ship was launched as Deluruguay 24 March 1942 by Bethlehem Steel of Sparrows Point, Maryland; acquired by the Navy 13 August 1942; and commissioned the same day. The ship was affectionately nicknamed “The Lucky Chuck” according to Ensign Frank J. Kempf, an officer who served aboard the Charles Carroll in 1945.

== World War II ==
=== Mediterranean Theatre ===
==== Invasion of French Morocco ====
The transport departed Norfolk, Virginia, 24 October 1942 in the Center Attack Group for the landings in North Africa, and on 8 November arrived off Fedhala, French Morocco, to begin the difficult landing of soldiers and their equipment over a beach whose narrow entrance was confined by rocky entrances. Her untried boat crews completed their part in the landing successfully, and on 15 November, Charles Carroll got underway for Norfolk, which she reached 26 November.

===== Damaged by mine =====
After replenishment, she sailed 27 December, bound for the Pacific, but while approaching the Canal Zone, struck a mine, and had to put into Balboa for repairs. On 1 February 1943, she was reclassified APA-28, and in March 1943 returned to Chesapeake Bay for training operations. On 8 June, the attack transport sailed for action once more. She carried the 40th Engineer Combat Regiment from Hampton Roads to Oran to Sicily.

==== Invasion of Sicily ====
Arriving at Oran 22 June 1943, Charles Carroll rehearsed, then loaded, for the assault on Sicily, and on 10 July, began putting troops ashore through the heavy surf of the Scoglitti beaches. Remaining off Sicily for 6 days, the attack transport repeatedly fired on attacking planes in the furious German air attacks on the assault forces.

==== Invasion of Italy ====
After ferrying reinforcements from North Africa, she returned to Oran 18 August to prepare for the invasion of Italy itself, for which she sailed 5 September.

Operating with the Southern Attack Force, Charles Carroll began landing the initial attack waves at Salerno 9 September, where a strong defense of the beach called for, and received, skill and determination from the boat crews. As resistance stiffened, Charles Carroll joined in bringing fresh troops into action, continuing support until 17 November.

=== Western Theatre ===
==== Normandy landings ====
After a short overhaul in Norfolk from 2 January 1944 to 11 February, on 22 February, she arrived in British waters to begin preparations for the return to continental Europe.

On 5 June 1944, Charles Carroll left England astern headed for formidably protected Omaha Beach with the initial landing force. Overcoming the difficult obstacles placed by the Germans there, her boat crews successfully landed troops of the 29th Division under enemy fire, and all through that historic 6 June plied back and forth, landing additional troops and equipment, and evacuating casualties. Charles Carroll sailed for England that evening.

==== Invasion of Southern France ====
After training off Scotland and in Italian waters, Charles Carroll sailed from Naples 13 August 1944 for the invasion of southern France, assigned to the thoroughly mined, well-defended beaches of Saint Raphael, where she got her troops ashore without mishap on 15 August. Until October, she continued to support the advance of troops in southern France with voyages to Marseille from Naples and Oran with French, British, and American troops, and Italian labor battalions.

=== Pacific Theatre ===
Charles Carroll returned to Norfolk 8 November 1944 for overhaul, and to prepare for Pacific deployment. The veteran of five major assaults reached Espiritu Santo, Noumea, 19 January 1945.

==== Invasion of Okinawa ====
On 27 March 1945, she sailed from Ulithi in the Northern Attack Force for Okinawa, carrying elements of the 1st Marines to the Hagushi beaches. She landed her troops 1 April in the deceptively quiet opening hours of this later fierce campaign, and remained to support the rapid advance of the Marines across the island for 4 days, firing on the many kamikaze attacks which began to sketch the bloody pattern of this operation. She returned by way of Saipan to Pearl Harbor, where she embarked passengers for San Francisco, arriving 22 August.

=== After hostilities ===
After the war, Charles Carroll made five voyages from the west coast to the Philippines and the Far East, carrying occupation troops west-bound, and returning servicemen east-bound. Ports of call included Manila; Nagoya, Sasebo, and Yokosuka, Japan; Tientsin, Shanghai, Qingdao, and Taku, China; and Guam.

=== Decommission ===
She was decommissioned and placed in reserve at San Francisco 27 December 1946. She was transferred to the Maritime Commission 29 October 1958. The vessel was sold for scrap on 1 April 1977 and was broken at General Metals Inc. in Tacoma, Wash., in 1978.

=== Awards ===
Charles Carroll received six battle stars for World War II service.
