= USS Monrovia =

Crescent City class attack transport

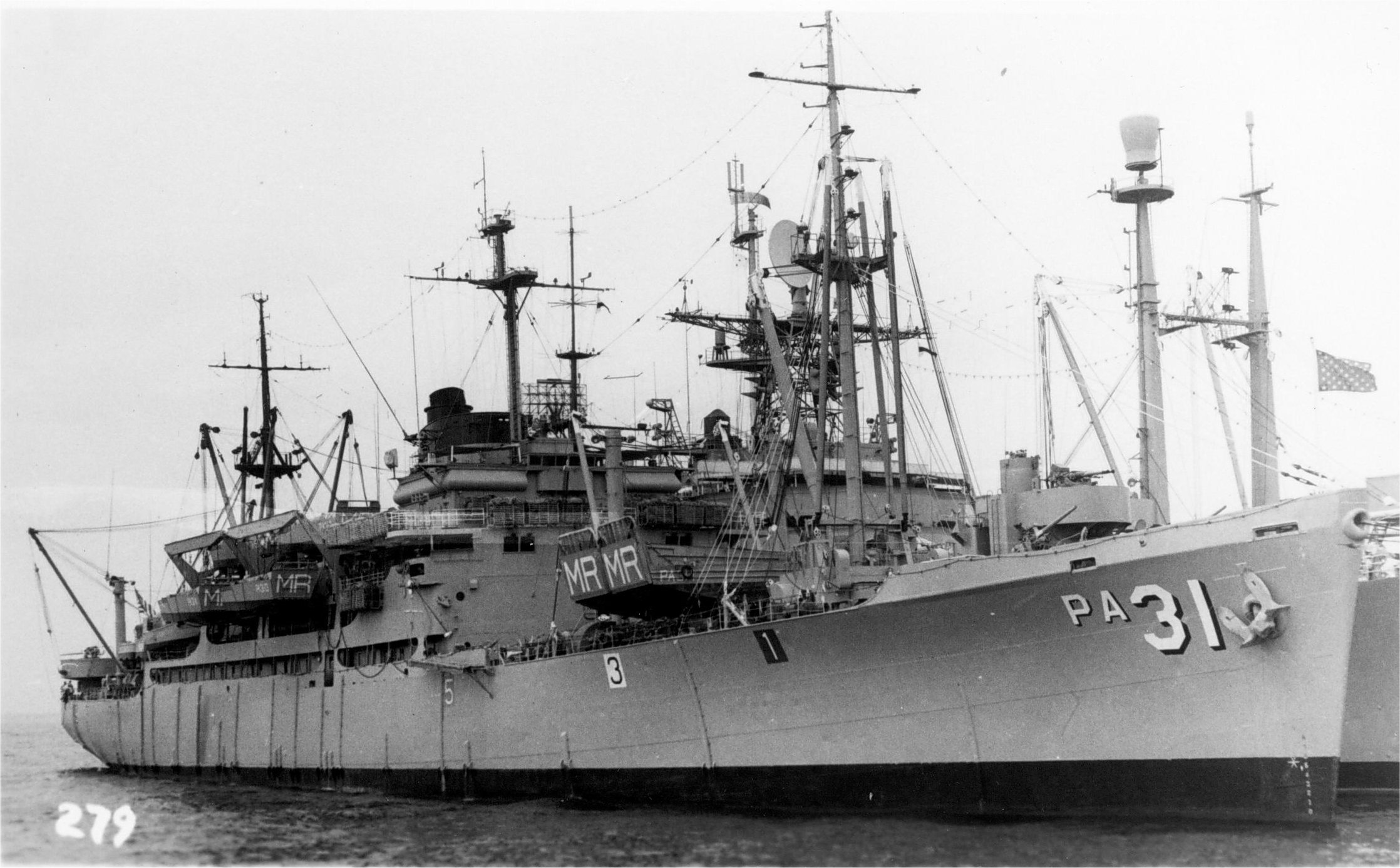
- USS Monrovia (APA-31) moored alongside another ship, date and location unknown

History

United States
- Name: USS Monrovia (APA-31)
- Namesake: Birthplace of President James Monroe, located in Westmoreland County, Virginia
- Builder: Bethlehem Steel
- Laid down: 26 March 1942
- Launched: 19 September 1942
- Sponsored by: Mrs John M. Carmody
- Christened: Del Argentino
- Commissioned: 1 Dec 1942 – 26 Feb 1947; 30 Nov 1950 - 31 Oct 1968
- Renamed: USS Monrovia
- Reclassified: AP-64 to APA-31, 1 February 1943
- Stricken: 1 November 1968
- Identification: MCV Hull Type C3-Delta, MCV Hull No. 152
- Honours and awards: Seven battle stars for World War II service
- Fate: Sold for scrap, 1968

General characteristics
- Class & type: Crescent City class attack transport
- Displacement: 8,889 tons (lt), 14,247 t.(fl)
- Length: 491 ft (150 m)
- Beam: 65 ft 9 in (20.04 m)
- Draft: 25 ft 8 in (7.82 m)
- Propulsion: 1 x General Electric geared drive turbine, 2 x boilers, designed shaft horsepower 7,800
- Speed: 16 knots
- Capacity: Troops: 103 Officers, 1,352 Enlisted; Cargo: 130,000 cu ft, 2,700 tons
- Complement: Officers 55, Enlisted 500
- Armament: 1 x 5"/38 cal dual purpose gun mount; 4 x 3"/50 caliber DP gun mounts, 1 x twin Bofors 40mm gun mounts, 11 x twin 20mm gun mounts.

USS Monrovia (APA-31) was a Crescent City class attack transport of the United States Navy, built from a C-3 Delta commercial freighter design, and was named for the Birthplace of President James Monroe, located in Westmoreland County, Virginia.

Monrovia (APA-31) was laid down as MC hull 152 by Bethlehem Sparrows Point Shipyard, Sparrows Point, Maryland, 1942-03-26; launched 1942-09-19; sponsored by Mrs. John M. Carmody; and commissioned 1 December 1942.

Reclassified APA-31 (Attack Transport) on 1943-02-01, Monrovia conducted shakedown and amphibious training exercises in the Chesapeake Bay through the winter months of 1943.

== World War II Atlantic Service ==
On 10 May, she departed Norfolk, with Army passengers, for the Mediterranean and her first assault assignment. After hurried conversion to accommodate equipment needed by a flagship, accomplished in 2 weeks by USS Delta (AR-9) at Mers el Kebir, she took on Army nurses as passengers for transport to Algiers. There, on 1943-06-20, Vice Admiral Hewitt and his staff came on board, and were joined 10 days later by Lt. Gen. George S. Patton On 6 July, she departed for Sicily where she served as the command ship of the Western Task Force for Operation Husky. Arriving off the assault area on the 10th, she suffered slight damage to her engine room on the 11th when a Stuka loosed bombs which straddled the vessel with two near misses. After repairs at Algiers, she returned to the United States with Italian POWs, mooring at Portsmouth, Virginia, 4 August.

== World War II Pacific Service ==
Reassigned later in the month, the attack transport took on Marines and headed for the Pacific. On 9 October she arrived at Wellington, New Zealand, departing, on the 27th, for Efate, the staging area for the Tarawa assault. By 20 November she stood off that atoll as flagship of TransDiv 18. Afterward, with casualties, elements of the remaining units of the 2nd Marine Division, and several POWs, she returned to Hawaii.

During December and January 1944, she conducted training exercises in the Hawaiian area with Marine and Army personnel. On 22 January she sailed for her third amphibious operation, Kwajalein, participating in the assault there on the 31st, and returning casualties and POWs to Pearl Harbor in February. She then sailed on to San Diego, arriving 17 February for availability and 2 months of training off southern California.

Underway for the combat area again in June, she participated in the assault on Saipan, again landing personnel of the 2nd Marine Division, in spite of reefs, mortar fire, and aerial resistance. After the Battle of the Philippine Sea, she once more transported casualties and POWs to Hawaii, whence she sailed, 9 July, for Guam with units of the 77th Infantry Division. Arriving on the 22nd, she remained in the assault area for 7 days before returning, with casualties, to Pearl Harbor for a brief availability.

In September, with 96th Infantry Division troops embarked, the transport sailed west again, arriving at Manus, the staging area for the upcoming Philippine offensive, 3 October. By dawn, 20 October, she was off Leyte. Unloaded by 1800, on the 21st, she got underway in time to clear the gulf before the arrival of Japanese naval units en route from the Sulu Sea. Heading southeast, she steamed to New Guinea, whence she lifted elements of the 11th Airborne Division to Leyte. She then sailed to New Britain, took on units of the 40th Infantry Division and returned to Manus to stage for the assault on Luzon.

Departing 31 December, she encountered aerial resistance in Lingayen Gulf, 1945-01-09, and, on the 10th, endured a Japanese suicide swimmer attack before departing for Leyte to take on 1st Cavalry Division troops for transport to the Luzon beaches. Monrovia then returned to the Solomons, took on units of the 6th Marine Division, and, as flagship, TransDiv 36, conducted amphibious exercises in preparation for Operation Iceberg, the invasion of Okinawa. From the Solomons, she proceeded to Ulithi to join other ships assigned to TF 53, the northern attack force, and headed for the Hagushi beaches. By dusk on 1 April, she had landed all her marines, but, because of nightly retirements, did not complete discharging her cargo until the 5th. She then steamed eastward, arriving at Portland, Oregon, on the 28th for overhaul.

Monrovia returned to the western Pacific after the Japanese surrender and immediately commenced transporting occupation troops and supplies to China and Japan, returning to the United States with battle weary veterans. She continued to transit the Pacific, between the west coast and Japan, as a cargo and personnel carrier until the spring of 1946, when she was ordered to the east coast for inactivation. On 1946-07-31, she reported to the Atlantic Reserve Fleet, at Norfolk, decommissioning there 1947-02-26.

== Cold War Service ==
Following the outbreak of hostilities in Korea, Monrovia was recalled to active service. Recommissioned 1950-11-30, she joined the Atlantic Fleet's Amphibious Forces the following spring, 1951, to train for fall operations off Greenland. On 27 December, she departed Norfolk, Virginia for the first of her annual deployments to the Mediterranean, which continued, with few interruptions, until 1967.

Assigned to PhibRon 8, she carried Marines while deployed with the Sixth Fleet and conducted amphibious exercises with them while operating along the east coast and in the Caribbean. The maintenance of a defensive readiness throughout this period enabled her to react positively during the many intervening crises such as occurred at Beirut, Lebanon, July 1958; Cuba, October, 1962; and the Panama Canal Zone, January 1964. In 1967 she served in amphibious assault training for Marines in Little Creek, Virginia. Boot camp troops were assigned on board, berthed in sagging old canvas bunk racks spaced 18" apart. Trainees then clambered down cargo netting into LCVP boats and "assaulted" the Virginia coast. In 1968, Monrovia was again ordered deactivated. Decommissioned 31 October, she was struck from the Naval Register the following day and was sold for scrap.

== Awards ==
Monrovia earned seven battle stars during World War II.
