= USS Calvert (APA-32) =

WWII US attack transport

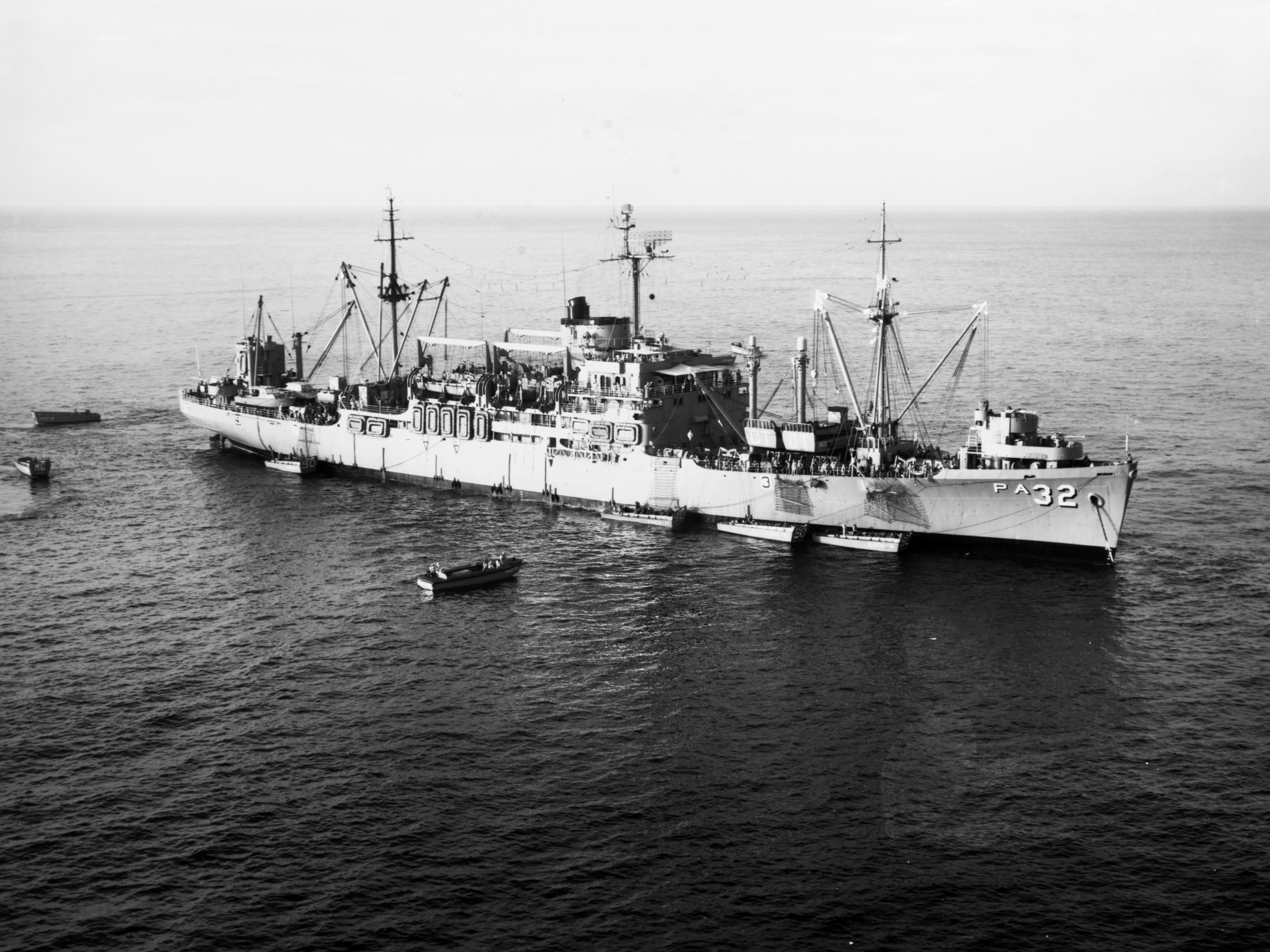

History

United States
- Name: USS Calvert (APA-32)
- Namesake: Calvert County, Maryland
- Builder: Bethlehem Steel
- Launched: 22 May 1942
- Sponsored by: Mrs M. G. Fitch
- Christened: Delorleans
- Acquired: 30 September 1942
- Commissioned: 1 October 1942 – 26 February 1947; 18 October 1950 – 18 May 1966
- Renamed: USS Calvert
- Reclassified: AP-65 to APA-32, 1 February 1943
- Stricken: 1 August 1966
- Identification: MCV Hull Type C3-Delta, MCV Hull No. 151
- Honours and awards: One Navy Unit Commendation, plus eight battle stars for World War II service and two for the Korean War
- Fate: Scrapped, 14 February 1977

General characteristics
- Class & type: Crescent City-class attack transport
- Displacement: 8,889 tons (lt), 14,247 t.(fl)
- Length: 491 ft (150 m)
- Beam: 65 ft 6 in (19.96 m)
- Draft: 25 ft 8 in (7.82 m)
- Propulsion: 1 × General Electric geared drive turbine, 2 × boilers, designed shaft horsepower 7,800 (5.8 MW)
- Speed: 16 knots (30 km/h)
- Capacity: Troops: 92 officers, 1,191 enlisted; Cargo: 130,000 cu ft, 2,700 tons
- Complement: 48 officers, 510 enlisted
- Armament: 1 × 5"/38 cal. DP gun mount; 3 × 3"/50 cal. DP gun mounts, 2 × twin 40 mm gun mounts, 4 × twin 20 mm gun mounts.

USS Calvert (APA-32) was a Crescent City-class attack transport that served with the United States Navy during World War II and the Korean War. In addition to her ten battle stars, Calvert was awarded a Navy Unit Commendation.

Calvert was launched 22 May 1942 as Delorleans by Bethlehem Sparrows Point Shipyard under a Maritime Commission contract. Acquired by the Navy 30 September 1942, she became the second Navy ship named after Calvert County, Maryland, designated transport AP-65. She was commissioned the next day. She was reclassified as attack transport APA-32, on 1 February 1943.

== World War II ==
=== Mediterranean Theatre ===
Calvert began the consistently superior service which was to win her a Navy Unit Commendation when she sailed from Norfolk, Virginia on 25 October 1942 for the invasion of North Africa. She landed her troops at Safi, French Morocco, on 8 November, and six days later sailed for Norfolk to train troops in Chesapeake Bay for other invasions. On 8 June 1943 she departed for the Mediterranean and her second major assault landing, the invasion of Sicily. She put her troops ashore at Scoglitti, Sicily, on 12 July.

=== Pacific Theater ===
By 3 August 1943, Calvert was back at Norfolk, a veteran of assault landings in the Atlantic, and now Pacific-bound for stepping stone invasions to the Japanese homeland. She arrived at Pearl Harbor on 26 September to train and land troops of the 27th Infantry Division on Makin, Gilbert Islands, 20 November. Her busy schedule took the transport back to the west coast the following month to train troops for forthcoming amphibious assaults, and in January 1944 she was underway for the Marshalls where on 1 February her troops stormed ashore on Kwajalein for another successful invasion.

Calvert's next operation was in the Marianas, where she conducted diversionary landings off Tanapag Harbor at Saipan (15–24 June) and Tinian (24 July), an effort which added to the success of the main assault on Saipan. She returned to Pearl Harbor in August carrying 420 Japanese and Korean prisoners of war, and the following month was again westward bound to take part in the invasion of the Philippines.

On 20 October 1944 Calvert was off Leyte dispatching her troops for the initial landings. She made a quick turn around and was back on 18 November to pour more men and equipment from New Guinea into the Philippines to ensure the Allied advance. At Cape Gloucester she embarked troops for another assault on the Philippines (9 January 1945) at Lingayen Gulf to begin the capture of Luzon. The following month, with troops embarked at Biak, Calvert successfully landed her assault waves at Mindoro on 9 February.

The veteran Calvert was now ordered to the west coast for overhaul and conversion to an amphibious flagship, arriving at Bremerton on 26 March. Calvert completed her conversion as the war ended in the Pacific, and on 24 August 1945 cleared for the Philippines to lift troops to Hiro Wan for the occupation of Japan. Magic Carpet duty, returning troops home to the west coast, was her assignment between 7 November 1945 and 31 May 1946.

Calvert arrived at Norfolk where she was placed out of commission in reserve 26 February 1947.

== Korean War ==
With the outbreak of the Korea War in the summer of 1950, Calvert was recalled to active service and recommissioned 18 October 1950. During her two tours ( actually, the Calvert made three tours ) in the Far East she trained troops in Japan and Korea, redeployed Korean troops, and transported troops to and from Korea from the west coast.

== Peacetime operations ==
Following this war Calvert remained on active service with the fleet, alternating west coast operations with cruises to the western Pacific, continuing through 1960.

During this service she took part in the Passage to Freedom operation in the summer of 1954 when she lifted over 6,000 Indochinese civilians from Communist-surrounded Haiphong to southern Vietnam. She returned to San Diego on 21 November 1954, along with several other attack transports.

Between 1954 and 1957 she served as the flagship for Comphibron 5, and made two cruises to the Far East, including troop training landings on Iwo Jima and in the Philippines. Ports of call included Yokosuka, Nagoya, Shimoda, Kobe, Nagasaki, Sasebo, and Kure, Japan, Okinawa, Subic Bay, Manila, Hong Kong and Pearl Harbor.

In 1958 during the Middle East crisis and Lebanon landings by the 6th Fleet, Calvert, combat-loaded, stood ready with the 7th Fleet, alert for any extension of trouble in the Pacific.

In November 1960 Calvert departed San Diego, with Comphibron 5 aboard and returned to San Diego in July 1961. An overview includes stops at Pearl Harbor, Yokosuka, Iwakuni and many months spent at Buckner Bay in Okinawa. Other stops included Manila, Subic Bay, Hong Kong, Chinhae Korea, and troop exercises on an island in North Borneo. Comphibron 5 left Calvert in Yokosuka in early July, transferring to the Paul Revere (APA number unknown) before Calvert got underway for the States.

In 1961 Calvert underwent major overhaul at the naval shipyards in Bremerton Washington. She received upgrades to her sonar and radar as well as diesel generators and boiler replacement. Her hull was blasted and repainted making Calvert battle-ready for assignment with Conphibron 5, and 7th Fleet assignment in the Vietnam War.

== Vietnam War ==
Calvert also participated in the Vietnam War, from November 1965 to January 1966.

== Final years ==
Calvert was decommissioned at Hunter's Point Naval Shipyard in San Francisco on 18 May 1966. She was then moved to the Naval Supply Center, Oakland, Traffic Management School for use as a training hulk until 1976.

Calvert was struck from the Naval Register on 1 August 1966. She was sold for scrapping on 14 February 1977 to Levin Metals of San Jose, California, which broke her up at their facility in Richmond, California.

== Awards and decorations ==
In addition to her Navy Unit Commendation, Calvert received eight battle stars for service in World War II, two for service in the Korean War and two for service in the Vietnam War.

== Sources ==
- USS Calvert (APA-32), DANFS Online.
- Photo gallery of USS Calvert (APA-32) at NavSource Naval History
