= London, Kiribati =

London
- Village
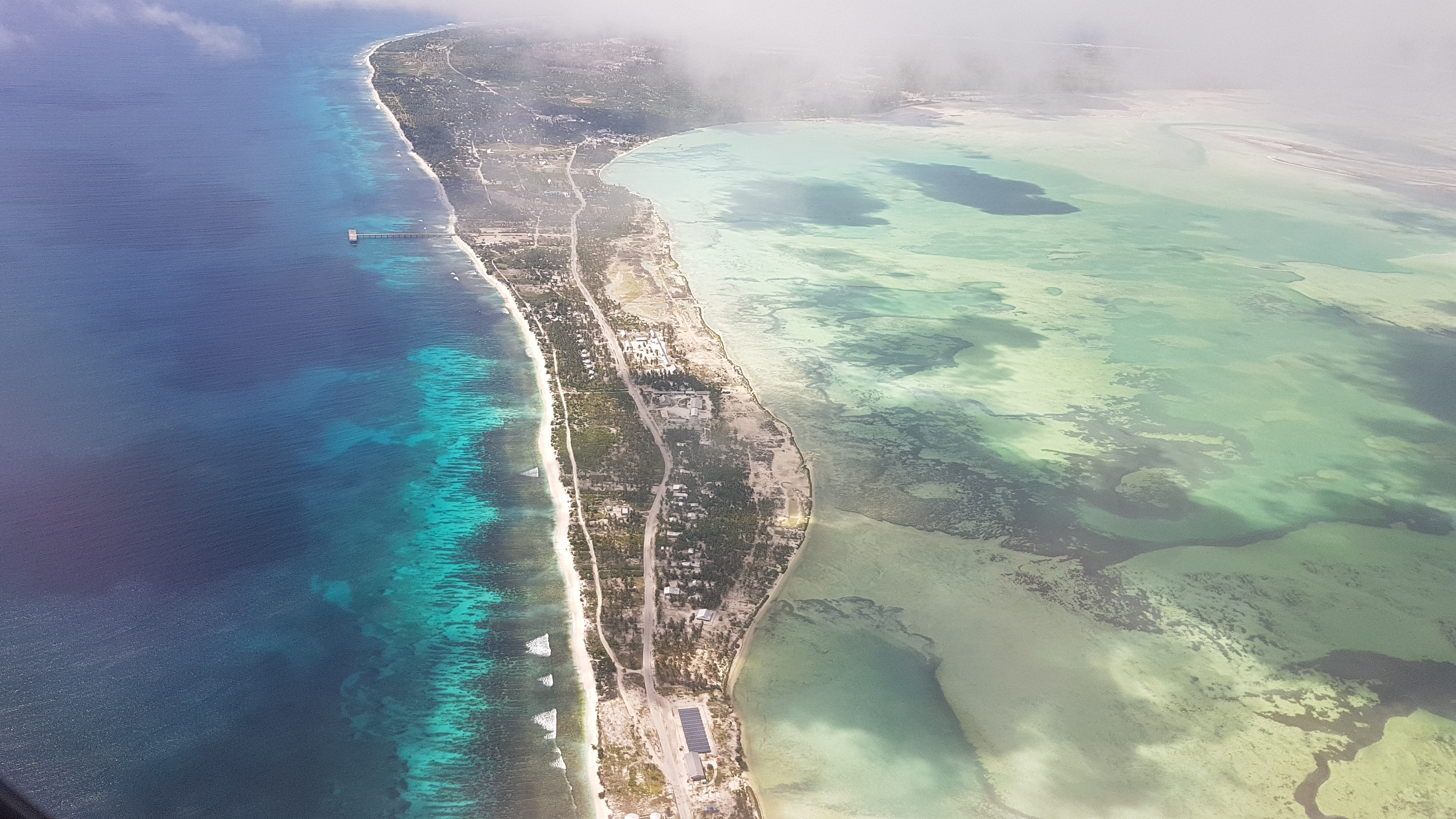
- London, Kiritimati

- Location within Kiribati
- Coordinates: 1°59′00″N 157°28′30″W
- Country: Kiribati
- Local council: Kiritimati

Population (2015)
  - Total: 1,895
- Time zone: UTC+14

London (Gilbertese: Ronton; historically: Londres) is a village in Kiribati, located on the island of Kiritimati, within the archipelago of Line Islands. It is the administrative capital of Kiritimati.

== Name ==
London was originally named Londres by French priest Emmanuel Rougier, who was leasing the island from Britain from 1917 to 1939, and wanted to honor the island's British connection. In 1939, the island reverted to Britain and Londres was anglicised to London. Its local name, Ronton, is derived from "London" written in Gilbertese according to its phonology.

== Demographics ==
In 2015, London was inhabited by 1,899 people, making it the second most populous of the four villages on the island. The overwhelming majority of the population of Kiritimati as of 2023 lived in the Tabwakea, Banana, London, or Poland villages.

== Infrastructure ==
The headquarters of the Ministry of Line and Phoenix Islands Development is located in London. The Port of London is Kiritimati's major port.

== Climate ==
Climate data for London
Month	Jan	Feb	Mar	Apr	May	Jun	Jul	Aug	Sep	Oct	Nov	Dec	Year
Record high °C (°F)	31.0 (87.8)	32.0 (89.6)	33.0 (91.4)	33.0 (91.4)	33.0 (91.4)	32.0 (89.6)	32.0 (89.6)	32.0 (89.6)	32.0 (89.6)	33.0 (91.4)	33.0 (91.4)	32.0 (89.6)	33.0 (91.4)
Mean daily maximum °C (°F)	29.0 (84.2)	29.0 (84.2)	30.0 (86.0)	30.0 (86.0)	30.0 (86.0)	30.0 (86.0)	30.0 (86.0)	30.0 (86.0)	30.0 (86.0)	30.0 (86.0)	30.0 (86.0)	30.0 (86.0)	30.0 (86.0)
Daily mean °C (°F)	26.0 (78.8)	26.0 (78.8)	27.0 (80.6)	27.0 (80.6)	27.0 (80.6)	27.0 (80.6)	27.0 (80.6)	27.0 (80.6)	27.0 (80.6)	26.0 (78.8)	27.0 (80.6)	26.0 (78.8)	27.0 (80.6)
Mean daily minimum °C (°F)	23.0 (73.4)	23.0 (73.4)	24.0 (75.2)	24.0 (75.2)	24.0 (75.2)	24.0 (75.2)	24.0 (75.2)	25.0 (77.0)	24.0 (75.2)	23.0 (73.4)	24.0 (75.2)	23.0 (73.4)	24.0 (75.2)
Record low °C (°F)	18.0 (64.4)	21.0 (69.8)	21.0 (69.8)	21.0 (69.8)	22.0 (71.6)	20.0 (68.0)	22.0 (71.6)	21.0 (69.8)	20.0 (68.0)	20.0 (68.0)	19.0 (66.2)	20.0 (68.0)	18.0 (64.4)
Average precipitation mm (inches)	25 (1.0)	71 (2.8)	64 (2.5)	210 (8.1)	89 (3.5)	81 (3.2)	51 (2.0)	15 (0.6)	2.5 (0.1)	2.5 (0.1)	7.6 (0.3)	15 (0.6)	633.6 (24.8)
Average precipitation days	2	4	6	13	6	6	3	1	0	0	0	1	47
Average relative humidity (%)	77	80	80	83	81	80	78	75	74	74	73	75	78
Source: Weatherbase
