= Paris, Kiribati =

Abandoned settlement in Kiribati

Paris
- Village
- Location within Kiribati
- Coordinates: 1°55′34.22″N 157°29′19.06″W
- Country: Kiribati
- Local council: Kiritimati

Population (2010)
  - Total: 0
- Time zone: UTC+14

Paris is an abandoned settlement in Kiribati, located on the island of Kiritimati, within the archipelago of Line Islands.

== History ==
Paris had a coconut plantation in the 1920s, which is now abandoned. French priest Emmanuel Rougier lived in a clapboard house in Paris, which has since been destroyed. Paris was mostly abandoned due to limited accessibility. It is believed that Paris was once home to roughly 20 people.

== Name ==
Paris was named by French priest Emmanuel Rougier who lived there while running a coconut plantation. He named the town Paris due to the fact that he was homesick.

== Population ==
The current population of Paris is 0 and is abandoned.
