= Tabwakea =

- Village
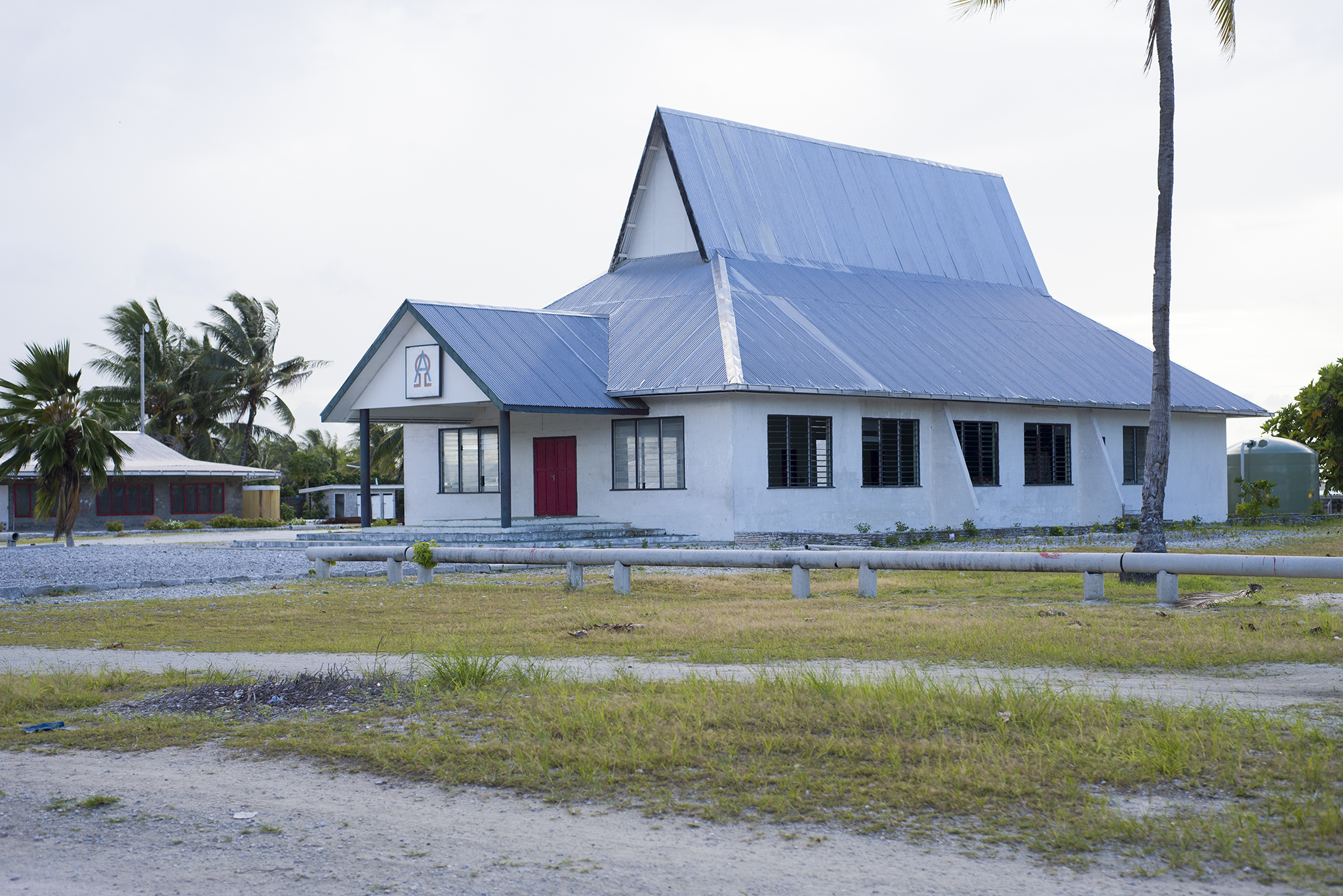
- Tabwakea Church in 2014.

- Location within Kiribati
- Coordinates: 2.018084°N 157.487729°W
- Country: Kiribati
- Local council: Kiritimati

Population (2015)
  - Total: 3,001
- Time zone: UTC+14

Tabwakea is the largest village on the island of Kiritimati, within the Line Islands of Kiribati.

== Name ==
Tabwakea means 'turtle' in Gilbertese, which refers to the island's first name given by James Cook, Turtles Island, which later became Christmas Island (Kiritimati).

== Demographics ==
In 2015, Tabwakea was inhabited by 3,001 people, making it the most populous village in the Line Islands.
