= Maiana Civil War =

The Maiana Civil War was an armed conflict on Maiana, Gilbert Islands, in 1877. It was fought between two kin groups. After Ten Tokou slew a relative of Tem Abraham Beru in a duel, Tokou was forced to forfeit his best land to Beru's clan as nenebo (recompense), under traditional law. Tokou rallied his wife's clan against Beru's in an attempt to retake his former property, but was murdered in the ensuing battle. Beru had been blessed by William Nehemiah Lono, Maiana's resident missionary, before the battle and his victory drew many I-Maiana to Christianity. Beru later headed the first island council of Maiana after British annexation.

== Background ==
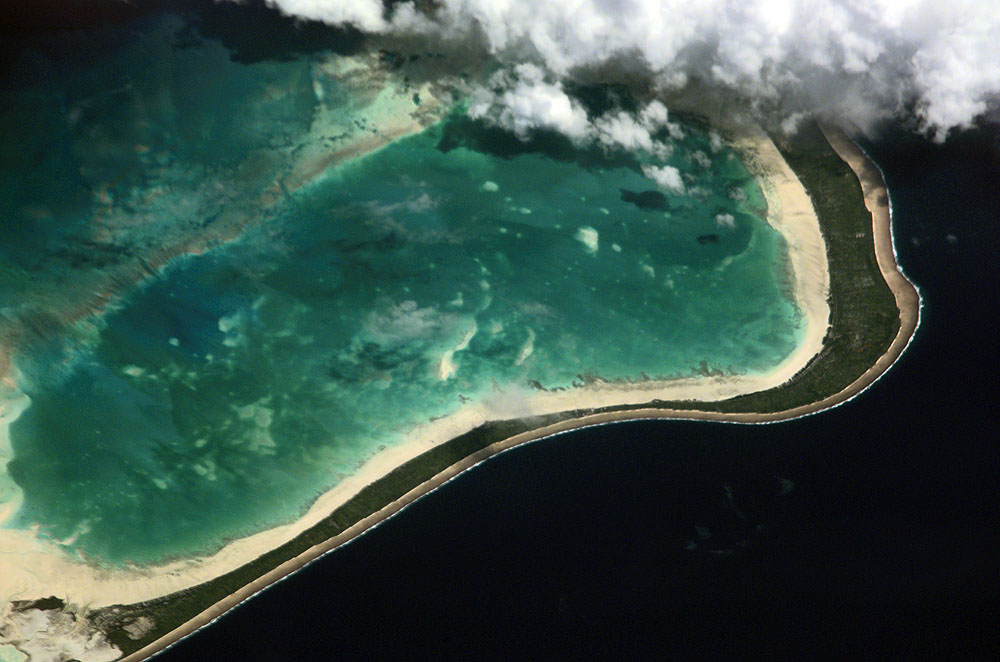
Maiana, island of Kiribati

Tarawa, Abaiang, Marakei, and Maiana were the most unstable of the Gilbert Islands in the 19th century, and were home to many warring factions. In 1871, William Nehemiah Lono, a Hawaiian Congregationalist missionary, arrived on Maiana. The island's 15.9 square kilometres (6.1 sq mi) of land was home to around 200 I-Maiana. Life on Maiana was beset by drought, famine, and war; according to Lono, many I-Maiana fought since they believed "it is better to die in battle than to die of hunger."

According to I-Kiribati historians, the Maiana Civil War began after the chief Ten Tokou killed another man, Te Koakoa, in a duel. Under Gilbertese law, Tokou was forced to surrender his two best lands to Te Koakoa as nenebo (recompense). Therefore, the Maiana Civil War is also known as Te Nenebo War. With little land left, Tokou left his village, Tannakoroa, to live with his father-in-law, Ten Tebeia, at Etanterawa. Requests from in-laws were very important. Most of the people of Etanterawa were related to Tebeia, so when Tokou asked them to help him reconquer his lands, they were obliged to help him.

Abraham Beru, a relative of Koakoa, rallied supporters from Bubutei, Raweai, Tebiauea, and Toora to defend his family's lands against Tokou. Beru was a chief of Bubutei; he had rechristened himself after Abraham (né Kaeia), a chief on Abaiang backed by the Christian mission. Beru had also befriended Lono, the missionary.

== Temangaua ==
Tem Beru, a relative of Koakoa's from the village of Bubutei, led the opposing side. Most of Beru's supporters came from Bubutei, Raweai, Tebiauea, and Toora. A Hawaiian Christian missionary, Rev. William Nehemiah Lono, had been preaching on Maiana since 1871, and was in Bubutei at the time. Before Beru left for battle, Lono blessed him in an attempt to win support for his mission. In a letter to his superior, Lono wrote that although he did not completely understand the cause of the war, he supposed "it was because of the lofty thoughts of some to become an important person like the king."

Both sides were armed with guns in addition to traditional weapons such as spears. In Temangaua, Tokou built a fort, about 3 feet (0.91 m) deep, out of sand to shield his allies from bullets. Beru's forces went to Toora, a village half a mile away. After several days, neither side had attacked Tokou's men left the fort to find food. A few stayed behind to guard the fort.

Nei Tarimwe, who was married to one of Tokou's men, betrayed Tokou by informing Beru, her relative, they had left. Beru's forces then attacked the fort and killed the guards. When Tokou returned, they killed him as well. Beru then ended the conflict since the instigator was dead and many of their men had relatives on the opposing side. Lono, the Hawaiian missionary, was pleased, since Beru's victory brought many converts to his mission.

== Bibliography ==
- Baraniko, Mikaere; Taam, Tangitang; Tabokai, Nakibae (1984). "Strife: The Civil Wars". In Talu, Alaima (ed.). Kiribati: Aspects of History. Ministry of Education, Training, and Culture. pp. 44–64. ISBN 978-982-02-0051-7.
- Morris, Nancy Jane (1987). Hawaiian Missionaries Abroad, 1852–1909 (PhD thesis). University of Hawaiʻi at Mānoa.
