= Poland, Kiribati =

Poland
- Village
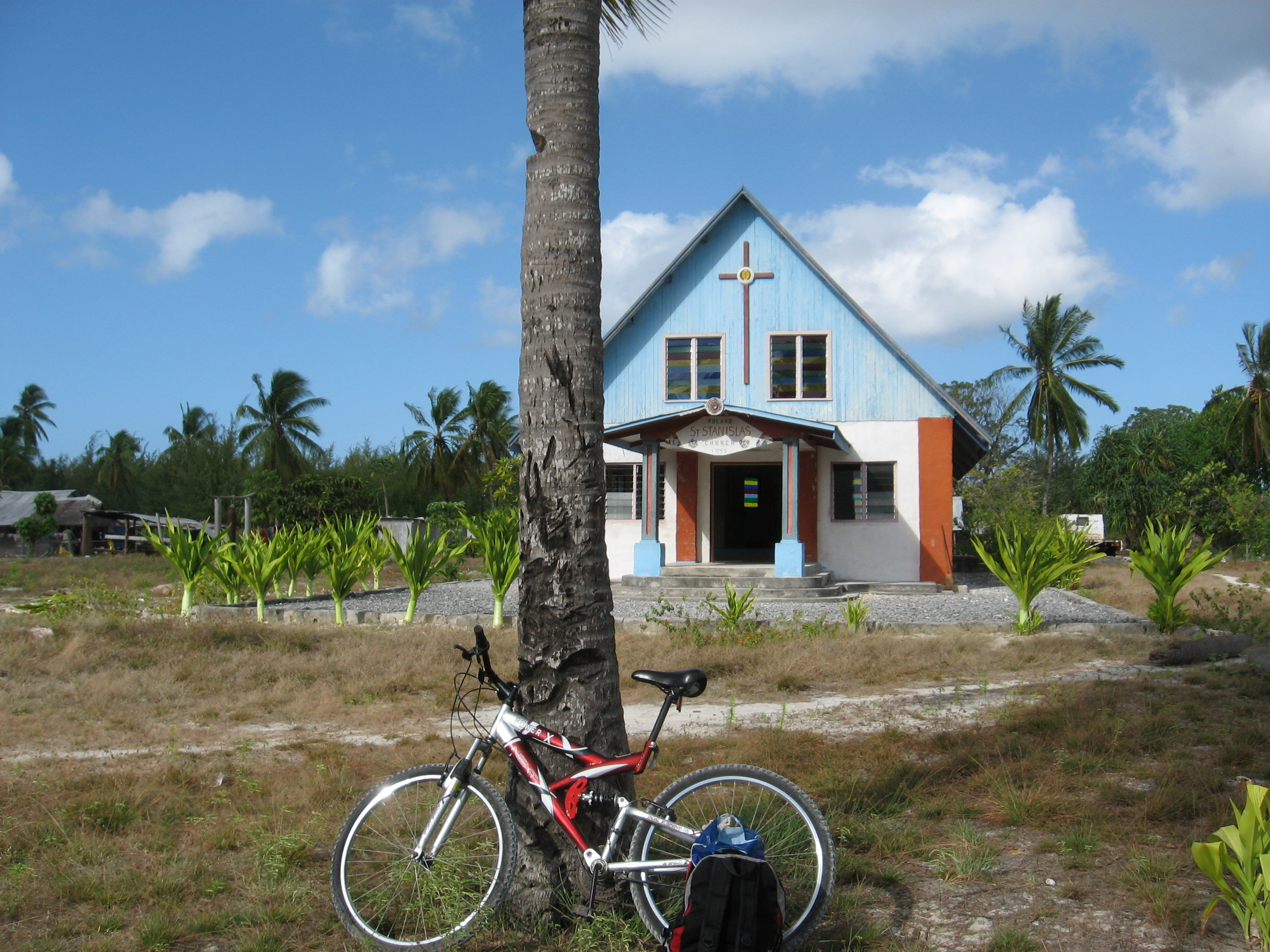
- Church of St. Stanislaw in 2007.

- Location within Kiribati
- Coordinates: 1°51′52″N 157°33′07″W
- Country: Kiribati
- Local council: Kiritimati

Area
  - Total: 0.52 km^{2} (0.20 sq mi)

Population (2015)
  - Total: 351
- Time zone: UTC+14

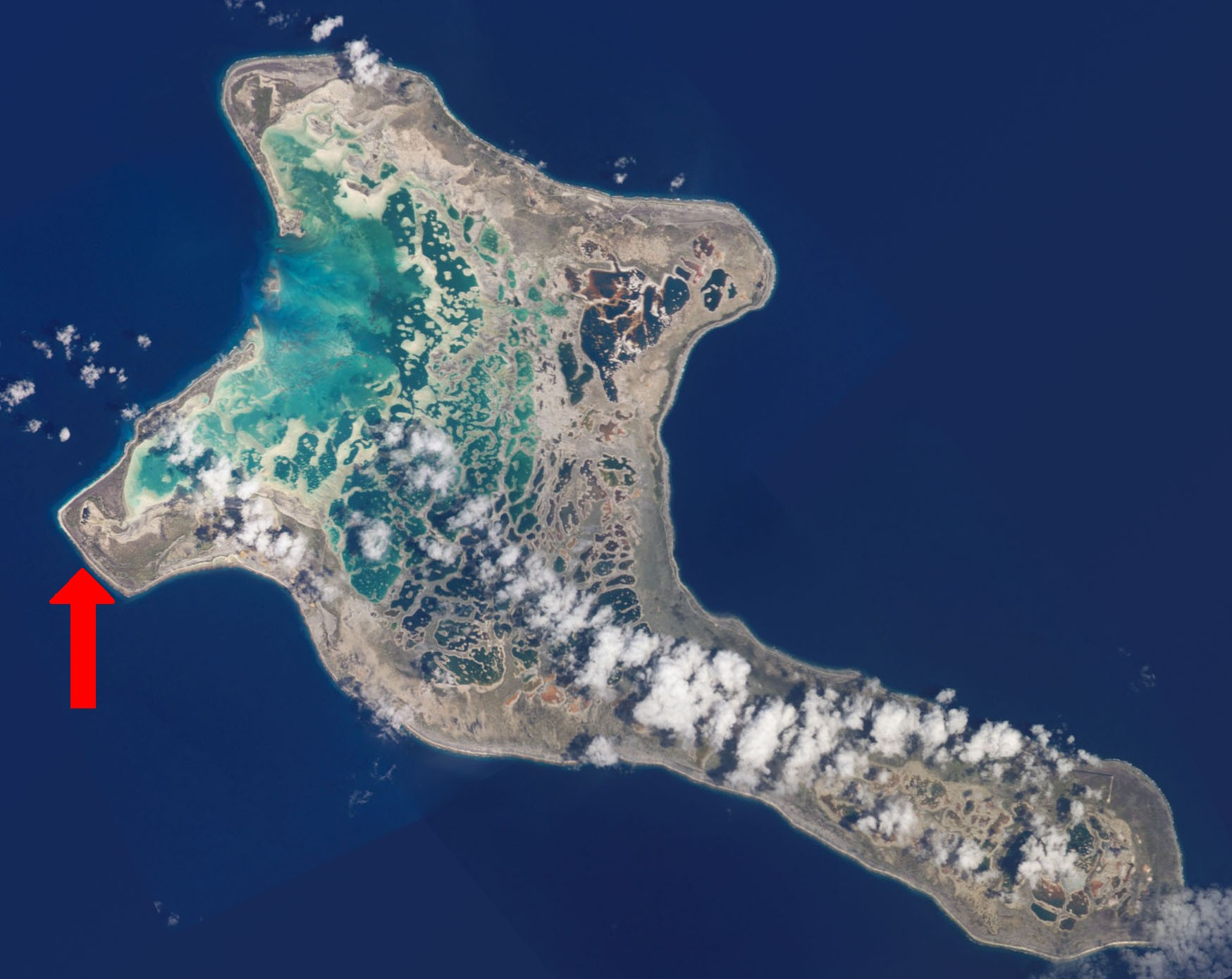
Location of Poland on Kiritimati, Kiribati

Poland (Gilbertese: Poran) is a village in Kiribati, located on the westernmost part of the island of Kiritimati, within the archipelago of Line Islands.

== History ==
The town was most likely founded in 1916.

== Name ==
The origin of the name is unclear. One version states that Poland was named in honor of Polish mechanic Stanisław Pełczyński, who greatly improved the island's coconut plantation by introducing a modified irrigation system that could effectively water palm trees during the dry season. Scholars however consider it a legend; some other explanations exist, but none have been fully confirmed.

== Demographics ==
In 2015, Poland was inhabited by 351 people.

== Infrastructure ==
Poland has a kindergarten, a primary school, and a Catholic church.

== Climate ==
In 2013, the Ministry of Environment in Warsaw, Poland produced a video featuring the village to highlight its sea level rise problem. The video was shown at the COP19. The video caused some controversy for possibly wasteful use of funds; however, it has been related to an ongoing Polish (mostly non-governmental, organized by the foundation Poland helps Poland) initiative providing the village with aid.
