= Bay of Wrecks =

Coordinates: 1°53′N 157°19′W

The Bay of Wrecks is a large bay which extends along the northeast coast of Kiritimati Island in Kiribati from Banana to Aeon Point. It is so named as it was a notable hazard to shipping, especially during the 19th century.
