= Aeon Field =

Abandoned airfield in Kiribati

- IATA: none; ICAO: none

Summary
- Airport type: abandoned
- Owner: Island Government of Kiritimati
- Operator: none
- Serves: none
- Location: Kiritimati
- Elevation AMSL: 016 ft (4.9 m)
- Coordinates: 001°45′48″N 157°11′43″W
- Interactive map of Aeon Field

Runways
Direction	Length		Surface
Direction	m	ft	Surface
09/27	1,830	6,004	Asphalt

Aeon Field is an abandoned airport located at Aeon Point on the southeastern peninsula of the Republic of Kiribati island of Kirimati. It was constructed in the late 1950s by the British to support their nuclear tests held at the island.

A Japanese Aerospace organisation intended to use this airfield to launch and land an experimental plane from 2002 onwards as part of the space vehicle test program HOPE-X. Although development of the airfield did start, the program was terminated before any test flights took

place.

== Facilities ==
The airfield was built to support medium-sized aircraft. There is a single runway oriented east–west and a small apron to the northwest.
