= Banana, Kiribati =

Village in Kiritimati, Kiribati

Banana
- Village
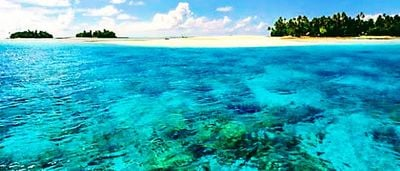
- The shore by Banana

- Location within Kiribati
- Coordinates: 1°58′58″N 157°21′51″W
- Country: Kiribati
- Local council: Kiritimati

Population (2025)
  - Total: 1,553
- Time zone: UTC+14

Banana is a village, located in the northeast of the island of Kiritimati, within the archipelago of Line Islands. It is located close to Cassidy International Airport.

== History ==
In 1962, when over 4,000 American servicemen were on the island as part of Operation Dominic, the village became known as Banana for unclear reasons.

In 2024, a Twitter account (@KiribatiGov) which had successfully impersonated the Kiribati government for some time, went viral after responding, "Fine. You're not invited." to a post making fun of the village's name.

== Demographics ==
According to the 2015 census, Banana was inhabited by 1,209 people, making it the third most populous of the four villages on the island. This includes 567 children aged 0-17, 529 people aged 18-49, and 113 people over 50 years of age.
