= List of islands of Kiribati =

This is a list of all of the islands of Kiribati. The Republic of Kiribati consists of 32 atolls and one raised coral island. These islands are dispersed throughout the three island groups that form Kiribati:

- the Gilbert Islands,
- the Phoenix Islands,
- the Line Islands.

All the Phoenix Islands are uninhabited except for one island, the sparsely populated Canton Island. The remaining Phoenix Islands make up the Phoenix Islands Marine Protected Area, which is the third largest marine protected area in the world.

The Gilbert Islands are part of Micronesia. The Phoenix Islands and Line Islands are geographically located within the Polynesian Triangle, but had no permanent settlements until European colonization and their current populations stem from the Micronesian inhabitants of the Gilbert Islands.

The table includes area and population data.

== Gilbert Islands ==
Image	Island (Previous name)	Land area (km^{2})	Lagoon area (km^{2})	Coordinates	Type	Population (2020)
Abaiang	Abaiang	16.0	232.5	01°51′0″N 172°58′0″E	Atoll	5,815
Abemama	Abemama	27.8	132.4	0°24′0″N 173°52′0″E	Atoll	3,255
Aranuka	Aranuka	15.5	19.4	0°11′0″N 173°36′0″E	Atoll	1,221
Arorae	Arorae	9.5	0	2°38′0″S 176°49′0″E	Atoll	994
Beru (Island)	Beru (Island)	14.7	38.9	1°20′0″S 176°0′0″E	Atoll	2,214
Butaritari	Butaritari (Makin)	13.6	191.7	3°10′04″N 172°49′33″E	Atoll	3,250
Kuria (atoll)	Kuria (atoll)	12.7	?	0°55′0″N 173°0′0″E	Atoll	1,190
Maiana	Maiana	15.9	98.4	1°50′0″N 173°01′0″E	Atoll	2,345
Makin (atoll)	Makin (atoll)	6.7	0.3	3°23′00″N 173°00′00″E	Atoll	1,914
Marakei	Marakei	13.5	19.6	02°01′0″N 173°17′0″E	Atoll	2,738
Nikunau	Nikunau	18.2	0	01°22′0″S 176°28′0″E	Atoll	2,055
Nonouti	Nonouti	29.2	370.4	00°40′0″S 174°21′0″E	Atoll	2,749
Onotoa	Onotoa	13.5	54.4	01°52′0″S 175°34′0″E	Atoll	1,417
Tabiteuea	Tabiteuea	38.0	365.2	01°20′0″S 174°50′0″E	Atoll	5,537
Tamana, Gilbert Islands	Tamana, Gilbert Islands	4.8	0	2°30′0″S 175°59′0″E	Coral island	1,028
Tarawa	Tarawa	31.9	343.6	1°25′0″N 173°02′0″E	Atoll	70,090
		281.5	1866.5			107,812

== Line Islands ==
Image	Island (Previous name)	Land area (km^{2})	Lagoon area (km^{2})	Coordinates	Type	Population (2020)
Millennium Island	Millennium Island (Caroline Island)	3.76	2.5	9°56′13.13″S 150°12′0″W	Atoll	0
Flint Island	Flint Island	3.2	0	11°25′48″S 151°49′0″W	Coral island	0
Kiritimati	Kiritimati (Christmas Island)	384.4	324	1°53′0″N 157°24′0″W	Atoll	7,369
Malden Island	Malden Island	39.3	?	4°03′0″S 154°59′0″W	Atoll	0
Starbuck Island	Starbuck Island	16.2	25	5°37′0″S 155°56′0″W	Atoll	0
Tabuaeran	Tabuaeran (Fanning Island)	33.7	110	3°52′0″N 159°22′0″W	Atoll	1,990
Teraina	Teraina (Washington Island)	14.2	0 (enclosed lake)	4°43′0″N 160°24′0″W	Atoll	1,893
	Vostok Island	0.24	0	10°06′0″S 152°25′0″W	Atoll	0
		495	461.5			11,252

== Phoenix Islands ==
Image	Island (Previous name)	Land area (km^{2})	Lagoon area (km^{2})	Coordinates	Type	Population (2020)
Canton Island	Canton Island	9.1	50	2°50′0″S 171°40′0″W	Atoll	41
	Birnie Island	0.2	?	03°35′0″S 171°33′0″W	Atoll	0
Enderbury Island	Enderbury Island	5.1	?	3°08′0″S 171°05′0″W	Atoll	0
Manra Island	Manra Island (Sydney Island)	4.4	?	4°27′0″S 171°16′0″W	Atoll	0
	McKean Island	0.57	?	03°36′0″S 174°08′0″W	Atoll	0
Nikumaroro	Nikumaroro (Gardner Island)	4.1	4	04°40′0″S 174°31′0″W	Atoll	0
Orona	Orona (Hull Island)	3.9	30	04°30′0″S 172°10′0″W	Atoll	0
Rawaki Island	Rawaki Island (Phoenix Island)	0.5	0.5	03°43′0″S 170°43′0″W	Atoll	0
		27.87	84.5			41

== West of the Gilberts ==
Image	Island (Previous name)	Land area (km^{2})	Lagoon area (km^{2})	Coordinates	Type	Population (2020)
Banaba	Banaba (Ocean Island)	6	0	0°51′34″S 169°32′13″E	Raised coral	333
		6	0			333

== See also ==
- ISO 3166-2:KI
- Districts of Kiribati
