= ISO 3166-2:KI =

Entry for Kiribati in ISO 3166-2

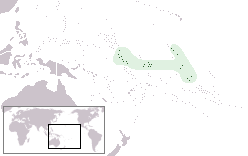

ISO 3166-2:KI is the entry for Kiribati in ISO 3166-2, part of the ISO 3166 standard published by the International Organization for Standardization (ISO), which defines codes for the names of the principal subdivisions (e.g., provinces or states) of all countries coded in ISO 3166-1.

Currently for Kiribati, ISO 3166-2 codes are defined for three groups of islands (20 inhabited islands). The groups of islands are geographical subdivisions, as the country has no official administrative subdivisions.

Each code consists of two parts separated by a hyphen. The first part is KI, the ISO 3166-1 alpha-2 code of Kiribati. The second part is a letter.

== Current codes ==
Subdivision names are listed as in the ISO 3166-2 standard published by the ISO 3166 Maintenance Agency (ISO 3166/MA).

Click on the button in the header to sort each column.

Code	Subdivision name (en)
KI-G	Gilbert Islands
KI-L	Line Islands
KI-P	Phoenix Islands

== Changes ==
The following changes to the entry are listed on ISO's online catalogue, the Online Browsing Platform:

Effective date of change	Short description of change (en)
2014-12-18	Alignment of the French short name lower case with UNTERM; update of the remarks in French
2014-11-03	Update List Source

== See also ==
- Subdivisions of Kiribati
- FIPS region codes of Kiribati
