= Vaskess Bay =

Bay in Kiribati

Coordinates: 1°50′N 157°30′W

Vaskess Bay is a large bay which extends along the southwest coast of Kiritimati Island in Kiribati.
