= Aeon Point =

Coordinates: 1.759°N 157.173°W

Aeon Point is the easternmost point of Kiritimati Island in Kiribati. There is an abandoned airport, named Aeon Field, near Aeon Point which was constructed before British nuclear tests.
