= Kiritimati =

Coral atoll in the northern Line Islands, Kiribati

Kiritimati (Christmas Island)
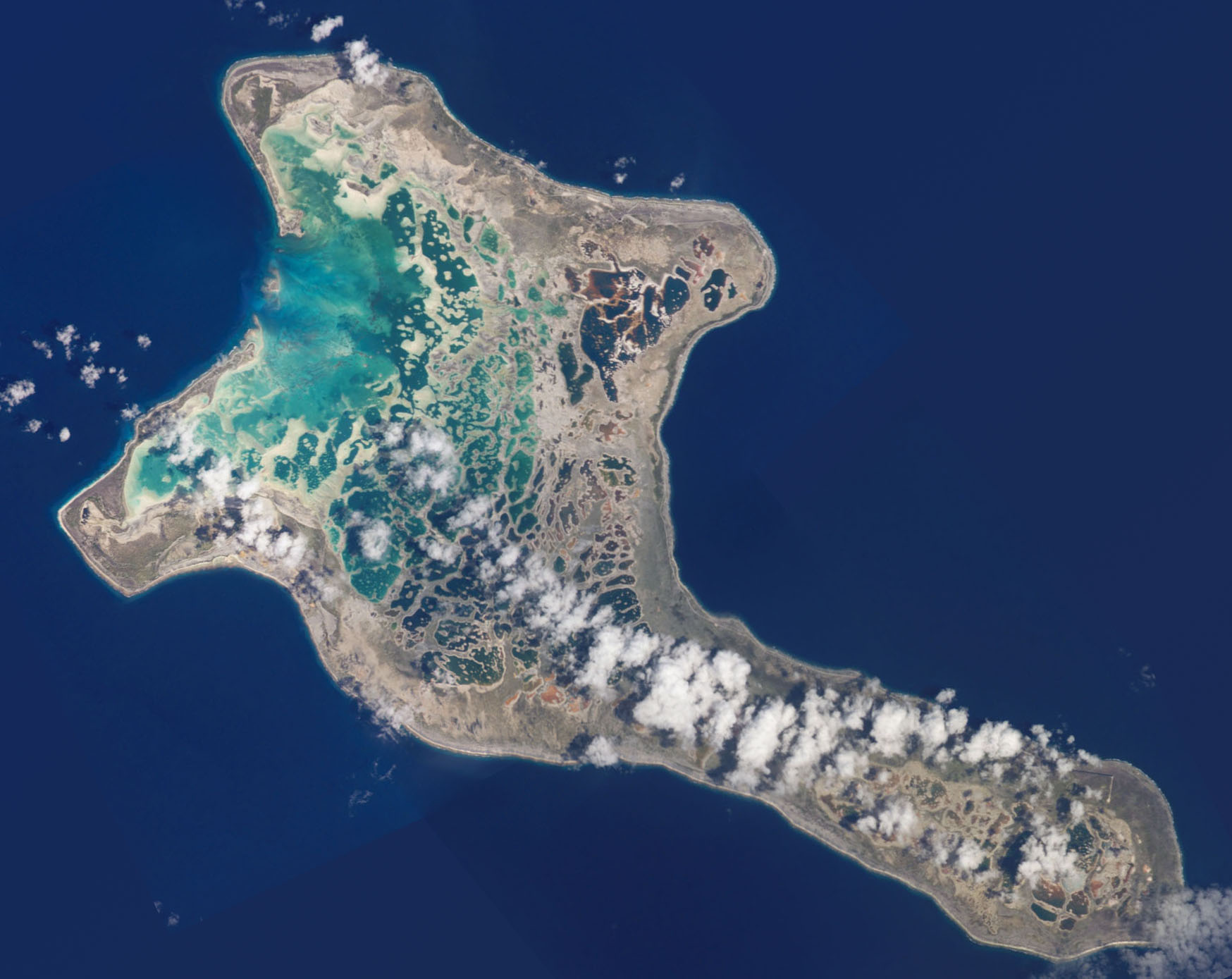
- Photograph from the International Space Station

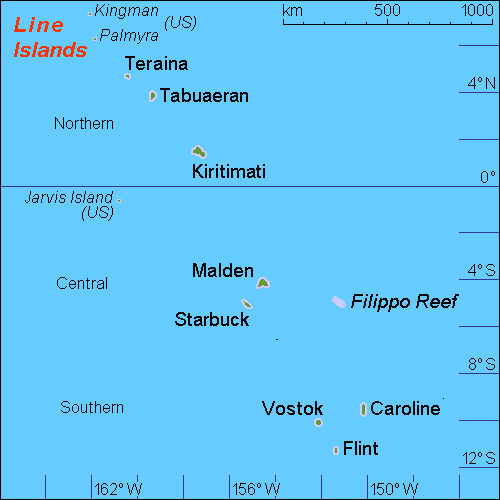
- Map of the Line Islands

- Location within Kiribati Location within Pacific Ocean

Geography
- Location: North Pacific Ocean
- Coordinates: 01°51′00″N 157°24′00″W
- Archipelago: Line Islands
- Area: 312.38 km^{2} (120.61 sq mi)
- Highest elevation: 13 m (43 ft)
- Highest point: Joe's Hill

Administration
- Kiribati
- Island council: Kiritimati
- Largest settlement: Tabwakea (pop. 3,547)

Demographics
- Population: 7,369 (2020 census)
- Pop. density: 16.6/km^{2} (43/sq mi)
- Languages: Gilbertese
- Ethnic groups: I-Kiribati

Additional information
- Time zone: UTC+14:00

Kiritimati (Gilbertese pronunciation: [kiˈrɪsmæs]), also known as Christmas Island, is a Pacific Ocean atoll in the northern Line Islands. It is part of the Republic of Kiribati. The name is derived from the English word "Christmas" written in Gilbertese according to its phonology, in which the combination ti is pronounced /s/.

Kiritimati is one of the world's largest atolls in terms of land area, consisting of about 312.38 km^{2} (120.61 sq mi) land area and a 328 km^{2} (127 sq mi) network of lagoons. The atoll is about 150 km (93 mi) in perimeter, while the lagoon shoreline extends for over 48 km (30 mi). Kiritimati comprises over 70% of the total land area of Kiribati, a country encompassing 33 Pacific atolls and islands.

It lies 232 km (144 mi) north of the equator, 2,160 km (1,340 mi) south of Honolulu, and 5,360 km (3,330 mi) from San Francisco. Kiritimati is in the world's furthest forward time zone, UTC+14, and is therefore one of the first inhabited places on Earth to experience New Year's Day (see also Caroline Atoll, Kiribati). Although it lies 2,460 km (1,530 mi) east of the 180th meridian, the Republic of Kiribati realigned the International Date Line in 1995, placing Kiritimati to the west of the dateline.

Nuclear tests were conducted on and around Kiritimati by the United Kingdom in the late 1950s, and by the United States in 1962. During these tests, the island was not evacuated, exposing the Kiribati residents and the British, New Zealand, and Fijian servicemen to nuclear radiation.

The entire island is a wildlife sanctuary; access to five particularly sensitive areas is restricted.

== History ==
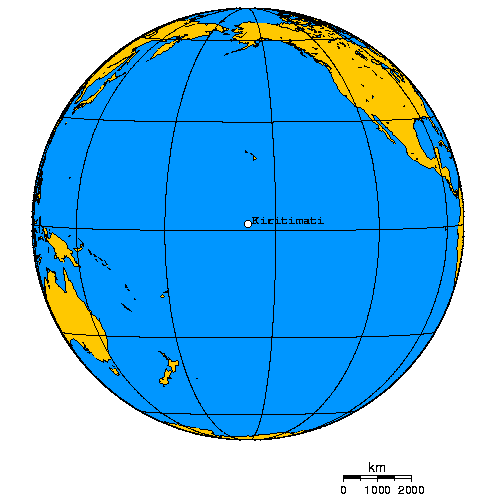
Location of Kiritimati

Kiritimati was initially inhabited by Polynesian people. Radiometric dating from sites on the island place the period of human use between 1250 and 1450 AD. Permanent human settlement on Kiritimati likely didn't occur until 1882. Stratigraphic layers excavated in fire pits show alternating bands of charcoal indicating heavy use and local soil indicating a lack of use. As such, some researchers have suggested that Kiritimati was used intermittently (likely by people from Tabuaeran to the north) as a place to gather resources such as birds and turtles in a similar fashion to the ethnographically documented use of the five central atolls of the Caroline Islands.

Archaeological sites on the island are concentrated along the east (windward) side of the island and known sites represent a series of habitation sites, marae, and supporting structures such as canoe storage sheds and navigational aids.

The atoll was then discovered by Europeans with the Spanish expedition of Hernando de Grijalva in 1537, that charted it as Acea. This discovery was referred by a contemporary, the Portuguese António Galvão, governor of Ternate, in his book Tratado dos Descubrimientos of 1563. During his third voyage, Captain James Cook visited the island on Christmas Eve (24 December) 1777 and the island was put on a map in 1781 as île des Tortues (Turtles Island) by Tobias Conrad Lotter in Augsburg. (Note: This is the first separately-issued map to depict Sandwich Islands (O-Why-hee) and Christmas Island: Two panels of text, beneath the map, in both French and German, mention the discoveries and report that Christmas Island was not inhabited. The text also claims that it is based on a map published in The Gentleman's Magazine of 1780. This previously-produced map, from the Gentleman's Magazine, was published by the elder Thomas Kitchin, initially in July 1780. Tobias Conrad Lotter (1717–1777) was also an engraver. James Cook described it: "On the 24th, about half an hour after day-break, land was discovered bearing North East by East, half East. Upon a nearer approach, it was found to be one of those low islands so common in this ocean; that is, a narrow bank of land incloseing the sea within. A few cocoa-nut trees were seen in two or three places; but in general, the land has a very barren appearance. ... The meeting with Soundings determined me to anchor to try to get some turtle, as the island seemed to be a good place for them and to be without inhabitents.") Whaling vessels visited the island from at least 1822. and it was claimed by the United States under the Guano Islands Act of 1856, though little actual mining of guano took place.

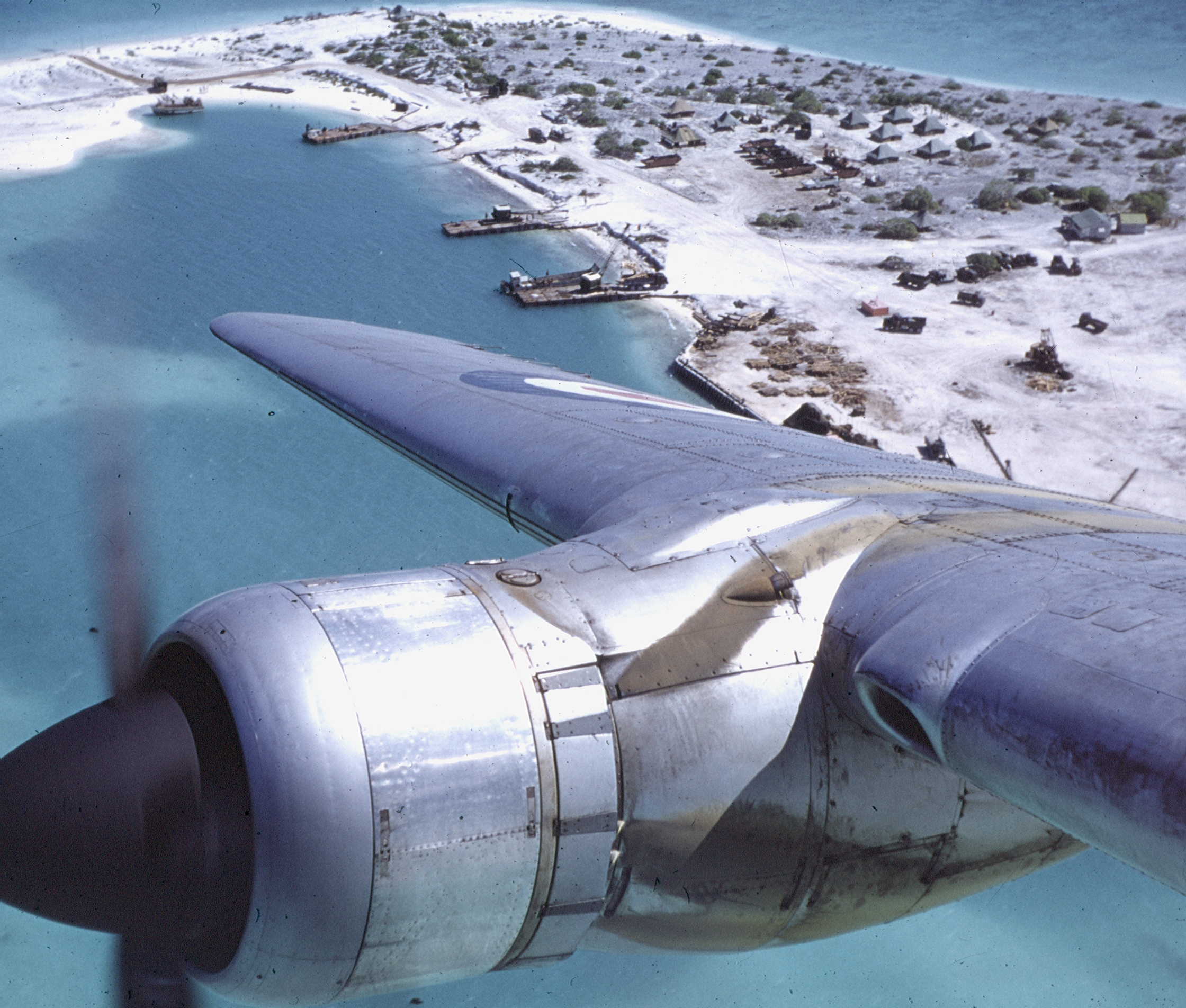
View of the village of London on Kiritimati, from a Handley Page Hastings of the RAF, 1956.

Permanent settlement started in 1882, mainly by workers in coconut plantations and fishermen. In 1902, the British Government granted a 99-year lease on the island to Levers Pacific Plantations. The company planted 72,863 coconut palms on the island and introduced silver-lipped pearl oysters into the lagoon. The settlement did not endure: Extreme drought killed 75% of the coconut palms, and the island was abandoned from 1905 to 1912.

Many of the toponyms in the island date to Father Emmanuel Rougier, a French priest who leased the island from 1917 to 1939, and planted some 500,000 coconut trees there. He lived in his Paris house (now only small ruins) located at Benson Point, across the Burgle Channel from Londres at Bridges Point (today London) where he established the port. He gave the name of Poland to a village where Stanisław (Stanislaus) Pełczyński, his Polish plantation manager then lived.

Joe English, of Medford, Massachusetts, Rougier's plantation manager from 1915 to 1919, named Joe's Hill (some 12 metres; 39 feet high) after himself. English and two teenagers were marooned on the island for a year and a half (1917–1919) as transport had stopped due to the Spanish flu breaking out in Tahiti and around the world. English was later rescued by British admiral John Jellicoe. English, thinking that the rescue ship was German and the war was still in effect, pulled his revolver on the admiral Jellicoe, causing a short standoff until some explanation defused the situation. (Note: After his rescue, English's adventures were chronicled in the Boston Globe https://www.roland-klinger.de/christmas-island/english.htm)

Kiritimati was occupied by the Allies in World War II with the U.S. in control of the island garrison. (Note: The first contingent of Americans was a company from the 102nd Infantry Regiment, a National Guard unit from New Haven, Connecticut.) The atoll was important to hold, since Japanese occupation would allow interdiction of the Hawaii-to-Australia supply route. For the first few months there were next to no recreational facilities on the island, and the men amused themselves by shooting sharks in the lagoon. The island's first airstrip was constructed at this time to supply the Air Force weather station and communications centre. The airstrip also provided rest and refuelling facilities for planes travelling between Hawaii and the South Pacific. The 1947 census listed only 47 inhabitants on the island. The U.S. Guano Islands Act claim was formally ceded by the Treaty of Tarawa between the U.S. and Kiribati. The treaty was signed in 1979 and ratified in 1983.

=== Spain's sovereignty rights ===
During the dispute over the Caroline Islands between Germany and Spain in 1885 which was arbitrated by Pope Leo XIII, the sovereignty of Spain over the Caroline and Palau islands as part of the Spanish East Indies was analysed by a commission of cardinals and confirmed by an agreement signed on 17 December 1885. Its Article 2 specifies the limits of Spanish sovereignty in South Micronesia, being formed by the Equator and 11°N Latitude and by 133° and 164° Longitude. In 1899, Spain sold the Marianas, Carolines, and Palau to Germany after its defeat in 1898 in the Spanish–American War. However Emilio Pastor Santos, a researcher of the Spanish National Research Council, claimed in 1948 that there was historical basis to argue that Kiritimati ("Acea" on the Spanish maps) and some other islands had never been considered part of the Carolines, supported by the charts and maps of the time. (Note: Based on Pastor Santos' interpretation, Kiritimati was not included in the description of the territory transferred to Germany, since it wasn't part of the Carolines, and therefore was not affected on the part of Spain to any cessation of transfer. Theoretically Spain would then have the only jurisdiction and right to the island. Pastor Santos presented his thesis to the Spanish government in 1948. In the Council of Ministers of Spain on 12 January 1949, the Minister of Foreign Affairs declared that the proposal had passed to the first stage of public attention. The Cabinet of Diplomatic Information of the Ministry of Foreign Affairs circulated the following note: The Minister of Foreign Affairs informed the Council of Ministers of the situation in which we find ourselves in view of information and public commentary in the press and because of the requests made of the Spanish administration. The Ministry recognises that it is a certain fact and historic truth due to Article 3 of the Treaty of 1 July 1899, that Spain reserved a series of rights in Micronesia and for another thing, the specifications of the territories which Spain ceded in 1899 leaves apart certain groups of islands in the same zone. However, no Spanish government has made any attempt in this respect.) Despite having sought acknowledgement of the issue regarding interpretation of the treaty, no Spanish government has made any attempt to assert sovereignty over Kiritimati, and the case remains a historical curiosity.

=== Nuclear bomb tests ===
During the Cold War, Kiritimati was used for nuclear weapons testing by the United Kingdom and the US. The United Kingdom conducted its first hydrogen bomb test series, Grapple 1–3, at Malden Island from 15 May to 19 June 1957 and used Kiritimati as the operation's main base. On 8 November 1957, the first H-bomb was detonated over the southeastern tip of Kiritimati in the Grapple X test. Subsequent tests in 1958 (Grapple Y and Z) also took place above or near Kiritimati.

The United Kingdom detonated some 5 megatonnes of TNT (21 PJ) of nuclear payload near and 1.8 megatonnes of TNT (7.5 PJ) directly above Kiritimati in 1957–1958, while the total yield of weapons tested by the United States in the vicinity of the island between 25 April and 11 July 1962 was 24 megatonnes of TNT (100 PJ). During the British Grapple X test, yield was stronger than expected, resulting in the blast demolishing buildings and infrastructure. Islanders were usually not evacuated during the nuclear weapons testing, and data on the environmental and public health impact of these tests remains contested. Servicemen believe that cancer and genetic damage were consequences of their occupational exposure and have sought apologies and compensation without success. A spokesperson for the UK's Ministry of Defence stated in 2018 that "the National Radiological Protection Board has carried out three large studies of nuclear test veterans and found no valid evidence to link participation in these tests to ill health."

The United States also conducted 22 successful nuclear detonations over the island as part of Operation Dominic in 1962. Some toponyms (like Banana and Main Camp) come from the nuclear testing period, during which at times over 4,000 servicemen were present. By 1969, military interest in Kiritimati had ended and the facilities were mostly dismantled. However, some communications, transport, and logistics facilities were converted for civilian use, which Kiritimati uses to serve as the administrative centre for the Line Islands.

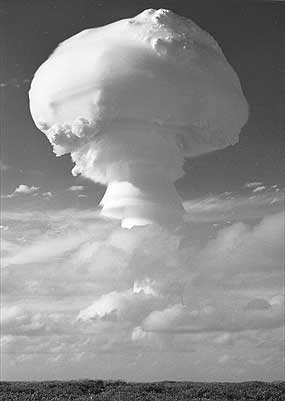
The British Grapple Y test on 28 April 1958

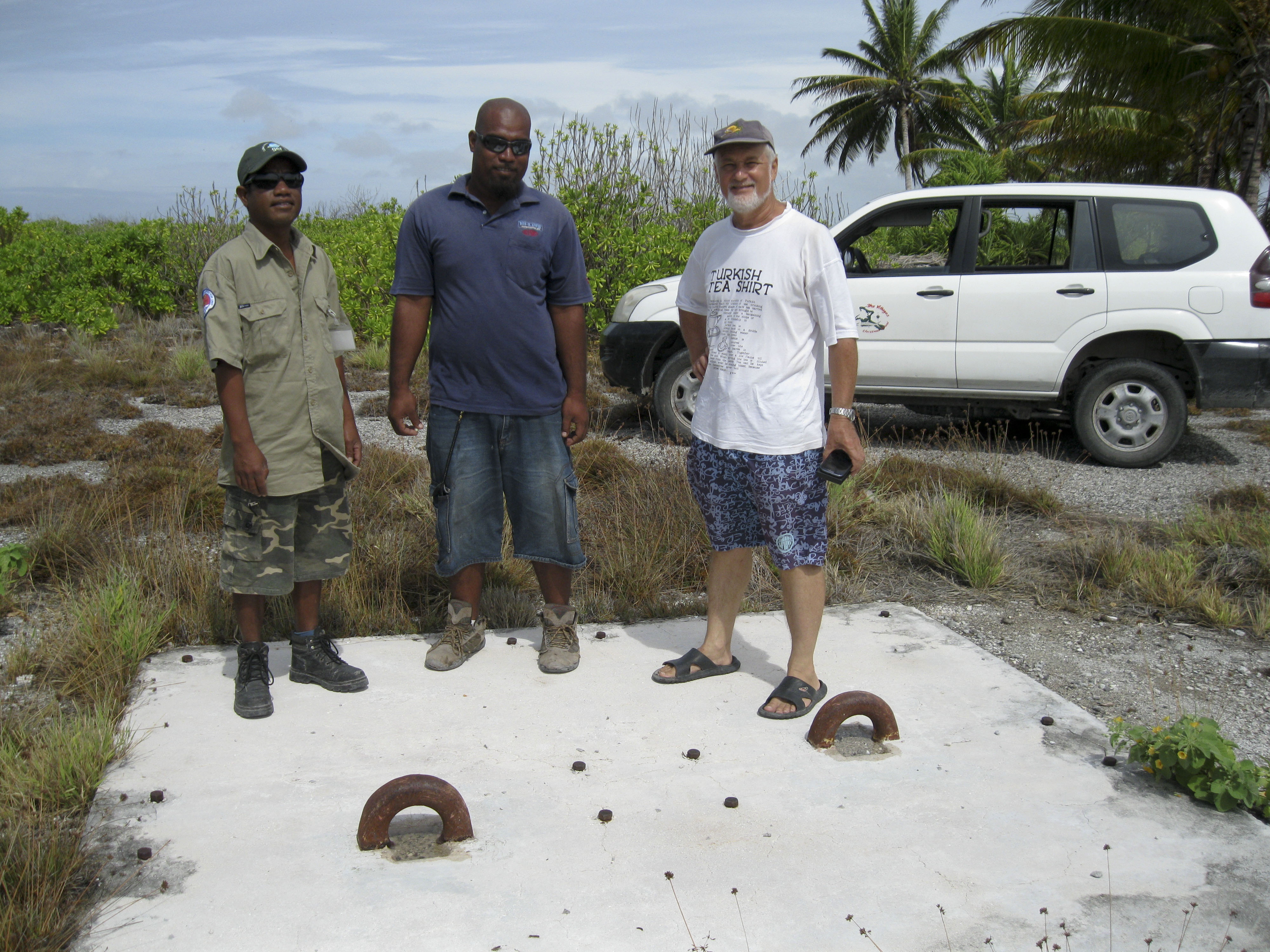
The bombs for the British Grapple Z1 and Z4 tests were hoisted by balloon; this is the East Point balloon anchor.

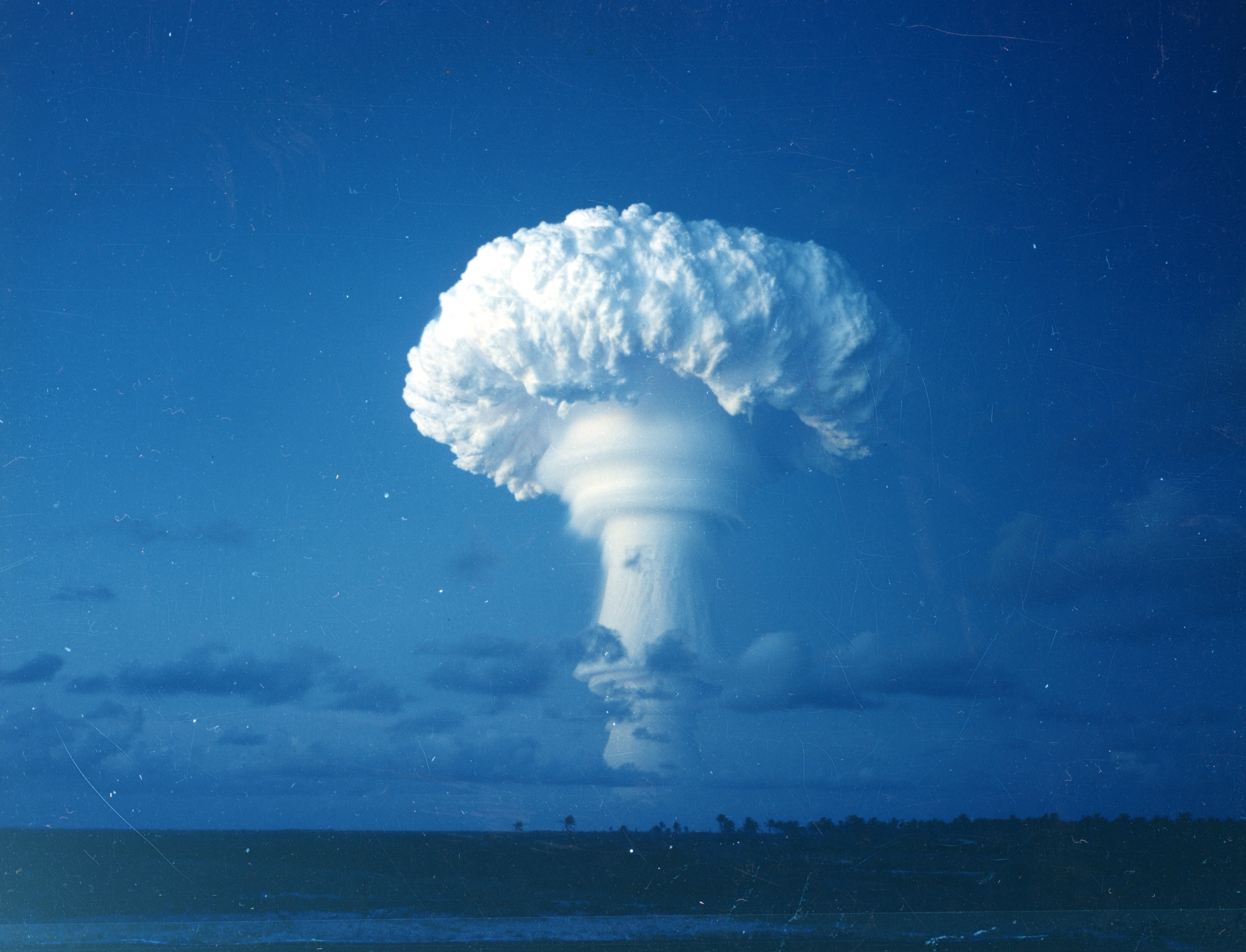
A US test in the Operation Dominic series, 1962

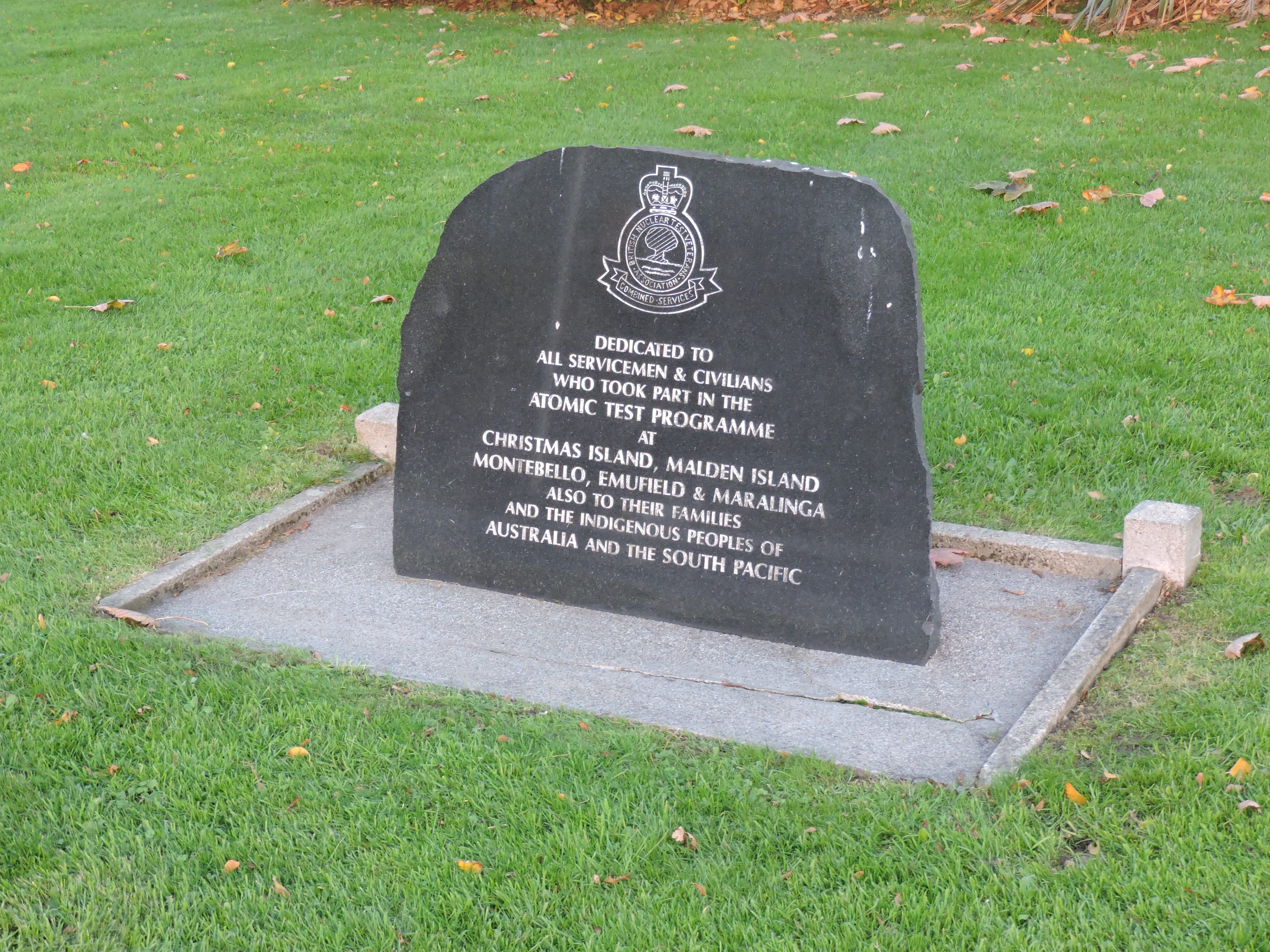
Memorial tablet in Paisley remembering the people involved in the tests

== Present status ==
Kiritimati population by village
No.	Village	Population (2015)
1	Tabwakea	3,001
2	London	1,895
3	Banana (Banana Wells)	1,209
4	Poland	351
5	Paris (ruins)	0
Kiritimati		6,456

The island's population increased from about 2,000 in 1989 to about 5,000 in the early 2000s, and reached 7,369 at the 2020 Census. Kiritimati has three representatives in the Maneaba ni Maungatabu. There are five main villages on the island, four populated and one abandoned; Banana, Tabwakea and London, which are located along the main road on the northern part of the island, and Poland (near South West Point) and unpopulated Paris (near Benson Point), which are across the main lagoon to the south.

London is the main village and hosts the port facility, and the ministry of the Line and Phoenix islands. Poland hosts a Catholic church, dedicated under the auspices of Saint Stanislaus. Banana is near Cassidy International Airport but may be relocated closer to London to prevent groundwater contamination. Paris is an abandoned village and is no longer listed in census reports.

=== Education ===
There is a primary school in Poland and two high schools on the road between Tabwakea and Banana: one Catholic, St. Francis High School, and one Protestant. The government high school, Melaengi Tabai Secondary School, is located on Tabuaeran (though the government of Kiribati wished to re-open its campus on Kiritimati instead). The University of Hawaii has a climatological research facility on Kiritimati. The Kiribati Institute of Technology (KIT), based on Tarawa, opened a campus on Kiritimati in June 2019.

=== Commerce ===
Most of the atoll's food supplies have to be imported. Potable water can be in short supply, especially around November in La Niña years. A large and modern jetty, handling some cargo, was built by the Japanese at London. Marine fish provide a large portion of the island's nutrition, although overfishing has caused a drastic decrease in the populations of large, predatory fish over the last several years.

Exports of the atoll are mainly copra (dried coconut pulp); the state-owned coconut plantation covers about 51 square kilometres (20 sq mi). In addition aquarium fish and seaweed are exported. A 1970s project to commercially breed Artemia salina brine shrimp in the salt ponds was abandoned in 1978. In recent years there have been attempts to explore the viability of live crayfish and chilled fish exports and salt production.

=== Transport ===
Cassidy International Airport (CXI) is located just north of Banana and North East Point. It has a paved runway with a length of 6,900 feet (2,103 m) and was for some time the only airport in Kiribati to serve the Americas, via an Air Pacific (now Fiji Airways) flight to Honolulu, Hawaii. Te Mauri Travel no longer offers weekly charter flights from Honolulu.

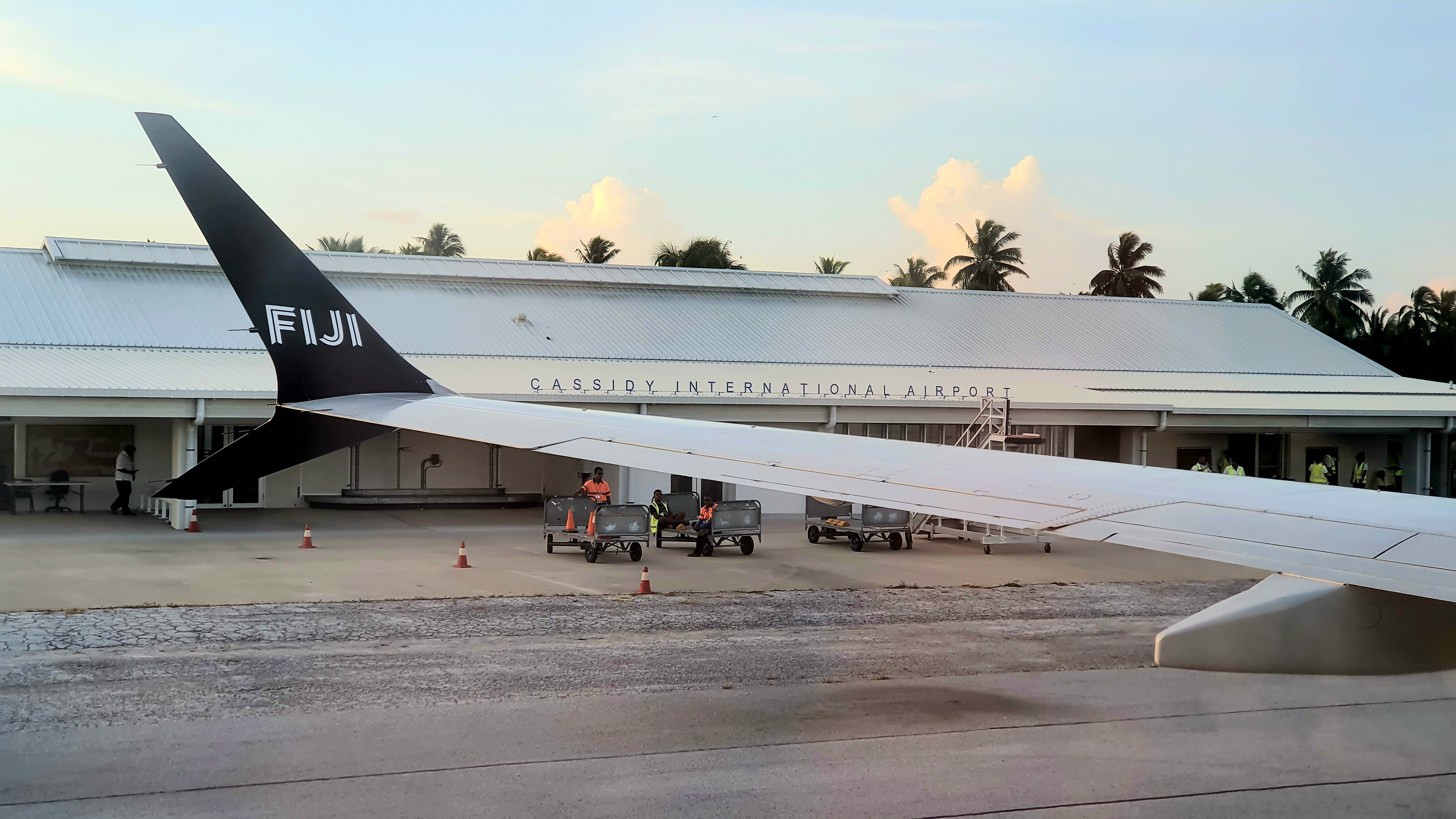
Cassidy International Airport, Kiritimati

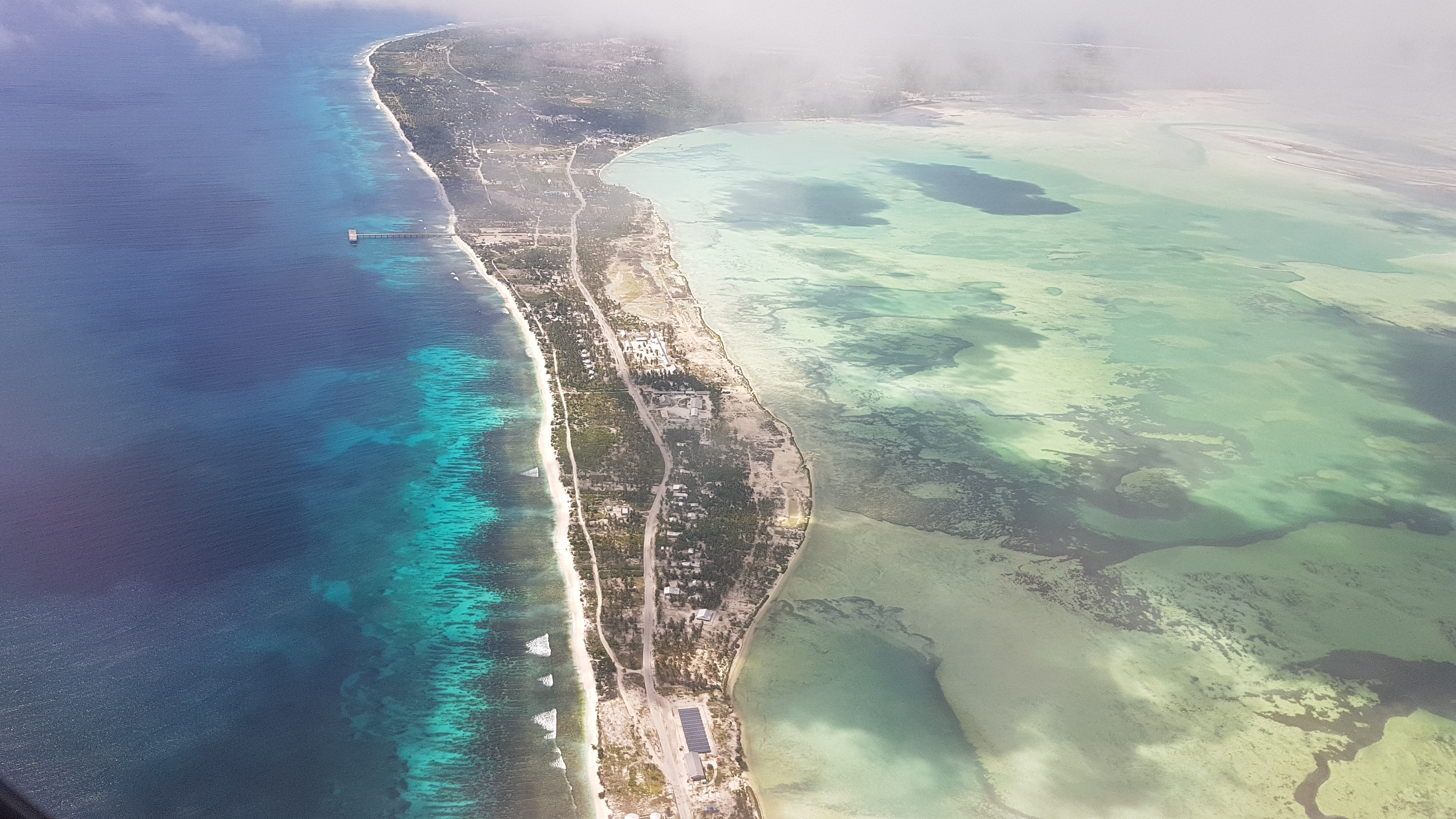

Air Tungaru was serving Kiritimati in 1981 with nonstop Boeing 727-100 jet flights to Honolulu (HNL), Papeete, Tahiti (PPT) and Tarawa (TRW) with each service operating once a week with the service to Papeete being operated in association with Union de Transports Aeriens (UTA), a French airline. Aloha Airlines introduced its weekly nonstop jet service between Honolulu and the island in 1986 operated with a Boeing 737-200. Aloha was continuing to serve Kiritimati from 2000 to 2003 with 737 jet service to and from Honolulu nonstop. Air Pacific ran flights to Kiritimati until 2008, when they ceased service over concerns about the condition of the runway. Services resumed in 2010. A monthly air freight service is flown using a chartered Boeing 727 from Honolulu operated by Asia Pacific Airlines.

Aeon Field is an abandoned airport, constructed before the British nuclear tests. It is located on the southeastern peninsula.

=== Communications ===
The island's remote location in the Central Pacific has hindered its communications with the rest of the world. In October 2023, all calls and data relied on slow satellite internet connection. As of June 2025, it has 3G data towers.

In July 2022 The Southern Cross NEXT 15,857 km submarine cable system, entered service, connecting Los Angeles and Sydney with a dedicated 377 kilometres (one fibre pair) branch to Tabwakea, Kiritimati. The cable landing station is located in Tabwakea, owned by Bwebwerikinet Limited. As of October 2023 the landing station was built, but still not commissioned. Apart from Australia and the US, the cable will also provide direct low latency connection to Fiji, New Zealand and Tokelau.

=== Tourism ===
There is a small amount of tourism, mainly associated with anglers interested in lagoon fishing (for bonefish in particular) or offshore fishing. Week-long ecotourism packages during which some of the normally closed areas can be visited are also available.

Christmas Island (Kiritimati) is recognized as a world-class destination for fly fishing on its extensive, shallow hard-sand flats and clear lagoon waters. The island offers ideal conditions for species such as bonefish and giant trevally, attracting anglers seeking both moderate-sized and trophy fish.

The remote location and relatively low fishing pressure allow for an immersive flats-fishing experience. Improved accessibility through renewed tourism infrastructure has helped establish Kiritimati as one of the premier saltwater fly fishing destinations in the Pacific.

In recent years, surfers have discovered that there are good waves during the Northern Hemisphere's winter season and there are interests developing to service these recreational tourists. There is some tourism-related infrastructure, such as a small hotel, rental facilities, and food services.

=== Prospective launch sites ===
In the early 1950s, Wernher von Braun proposed using this island as a launch site for crewed spacecraft, based on its proximity to the equator, and the generally empty ocean down-range (east).

There is a Japanese JAXA satellite tracking station. The abandoned Aeon Field had at one time been proposed for reuse by the Japanese for their now-cancelled HOPE-X space shuttle project.

Kiritimati is also located fairly close to the Sea Launch satellite launching spot at 0° N 154° W, about 370 kilometres (200 nmi) to the east in international waters.

== Geography ==
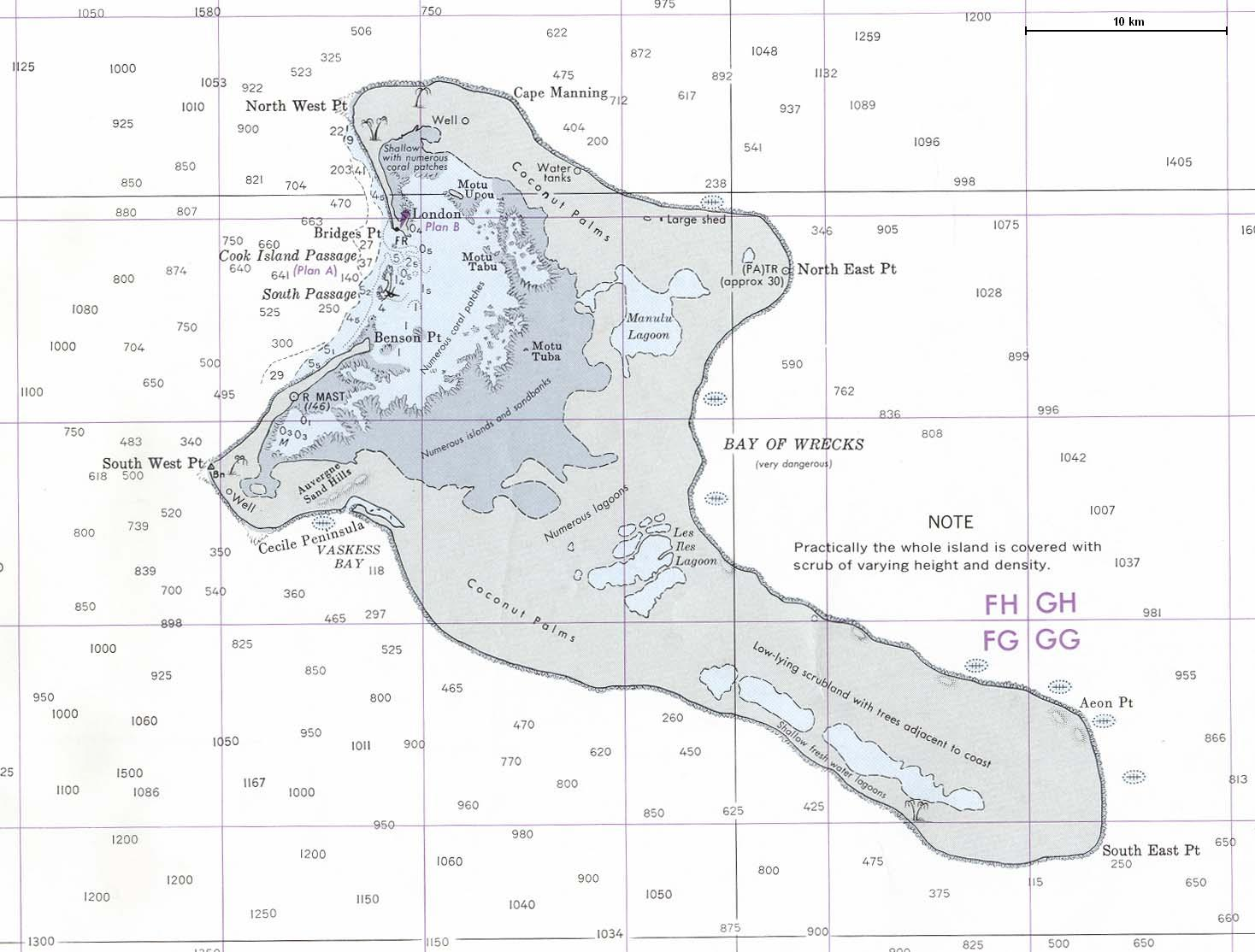
Nautical chart (1977)

Kiritimati's roughly 328 km^{2} (127 sq mi) lagoon area opens to the sea in the northwest; Burgle Channel (the entrance to the lagoon) is divided into the northern Cook Island Passage and the southern South Passage. The southeastern part of the lagoon area is partially desiccated. The lagoon area currently consists of a 160 km^{2} (62 sq mi) main lagoon at Burgle Channel. Southeast of this, the lagoon gradually transitions into a network of subsidiary lagoons, tidal flats, partially hypersaline brine ponds and salt pans which have a total combined area of about 168 km^{2} (65 sq mi). Thus, the land and lagoon areas can only be given approximately, as no firm boundary exists between the main island body and the salt flats.

Kiritimati is a raised coral atoll with about 312.38 km^{2} (120.61 sq mi) land area surrounding a lagoon area of roughly the same size. Kiritimati has the largest land area in the world amongst atolls that contain a lagoon, and the third largest land area overall, after Lifou Island and Rennell Island. Kiritimati is often cited as being the world's largest atoll by land area, however, because Lifou Island and Rennell Island do not have lagoons and therefore end up being overlooked as atolls.

In addition to the main island, there are several smaller ones. Cook Island is part of the atoll proper but unconnected to the Kiritimati mainland. It is a sand/coral island of 19 ha (47 acres), divides Burgle Channel into the northern and the southern entrance, and has a large seabird colony. Islets (motus) in the lagoon include Motu Tabu (3.5 ha or 8.6 acres) with its Pisonia forest and the shrub-covered Motu Upua (also called Motu Upou or Motu Upoa, 19 ha or 47 acres) at the northern side, and Ngaontetaake (2.7 ha or 7 acres) at the eastern side.

Joe's Hill (originally La colline de Joe) on the north coast of the south-eastern peninsula, southeast of Artemia Corners, is the highest point on the atoll, at about 13 m (43 ft) ASL. On the northwestern peninsula for example, the land rises only to some 7 m (23 ft), which is still considerable for an atoll. Due to its isolation in the vast Pacific Ocean, Joe's Hill is the 33rd most topographically isolated summit on Earth.

Vaskess Bay is a large bay which extends along the southwest coast of Kiritimati Island.

=== Climate ===
Despite its proximity to the Intertropical Convergence Zone (ITCZ), Kiritimati is located in an equatorial dry zone and rainfall is rather low except during El Niño years; 873 mm (34.4 in) on average per year, in some years it can be as little as 177 mm (7.0 in) and much of the flats and ponds can dry up, as happened in late 1978. On the other hand, in some exceptionally wet years abundant downpours in March–April may result in a total annual precipitation of over 2,500 mm (98 in). Kiritimati is thus affected by regular, severe droughts. They are exacerbated by its geological structure; climatically "dry" Pacific islands are more typically located in the "desert belt" at about 30°N or S latitude. Kiritimati is a raised atoll, and although it does occasionally receive plenty of precipitation, little is retained given the porous carbonate rock, the thin soil, and the absence of dense vegetation cover on much of the island, while evaporation is constantly high. Consequently, Kiritimati is one of the rather few places close to the Equator that has an effectively arid climate.

The temperature is constantly between 24 and 30 °C (75 and 86 °F) with more diurnal temperature variation than seasonal variation. Easterly trade winds predominate.

Climate data for London, Kiritimati, Kiribati
Month	Jan	Feb	Mar	Apr	May	Jun	Jul	Aug	Sep	Oct	Nov	Dec	Year
Record high °C (°F)	32 (89)	33 (91)	33 (92)	33 (92)	34 (93)	32 (90)	32 (90)	33 (91)	33 (91)	33 (92)	33 (92)	33 (91)	34 (93)
Mean daily maximum °C (°F)	29 (85)	29 (85)	30 (86)	30 (86)	31 (87)	31 (87)	30 (86)	31 (87)	31 (87)	31 (87)	30 (86)	30 (86)	30 (86)
Daily mean °C (°F)	27 (80)	27 (80)	27 (81)	27 (81)	27 (81)	27 (81)	27 (81)	28 (82)	27 (81)	27 (81)	27 (81)	27 (80)	27 (81)
Mean daily minimum °C (°F)	24 (75)	24 (75)	24 (76)	24 (76)	24 (76)	24 (76)	24 (76)	25 (77)	24 (76)	24 (75)	24 (76)	24 (75)	24 (76)
Record low °C (°F)	19 (66)	22 (71)	22 (71)	21 (70)	23 (73)	20 (68)	22 (72)	22 (71)	21 (69)	20 (68)	19 (67)	21 (69)	19 (66)
Average precipitation mm (inches)	25 (1.0)	71 (2.8)	64 (2.5)	210 (8.1)	89 (3.5)	81 (3.2)	51 (2.0)	15 (0.6)	2.5 (0.1)	2.5 (0.1)	7.6 (0.3)	15 (0.6)	633.6 (24.8)
Average precipitation days	2.4	4.6	6.0	13.8	6.8	6.1	3.0	1.8	0.1	0.3	0.7	1.7	47.3
Average relative humidity (%)	77	80	80	83	81	80	78	75	74	74	73	75	78
Source: Weatherbase

=== Demography ===
At the first census done in the Gilbert and Ellice Islands colony in 1931, there were only 38 inhabitants on the island, most of them workers of the Emmanuel Rougier Company. After WWII in 1947 there were 52 inhabitants. After the nuclear tests, in 1963, this had increased to 477, reducing to 367 by 1967 but increasing again to 674 in 1973, 1,265 in 1978, 1,737 in the 1985 census, 2,537 in 1990, 3,225 in 1995, 3,431 in 2000, 5,115 in 2005, 5,586 in 2010, 6,456 in 2015 and 7,369 in 2020. This was the fastest population growth in Kiribati.

== Ecology ==
The flora and the fauna consist of taxa adapted to drought. Terrestrial fauna is scant; there are no truly native land mammals and only one native land bird – Kiribati's endemic reed-warbler, the bokikokiko (Acrocephalus aequinoctialis). The 1957 attempt to introduce the endangered Rimitara lorikeet (Vini kuhlii) has largely failed; a few birds seem to linger on, but the lack of abundant coconut palm forest, on which this tiny parrot depends, makes Kiritimati a suboptimal habitat for this species.

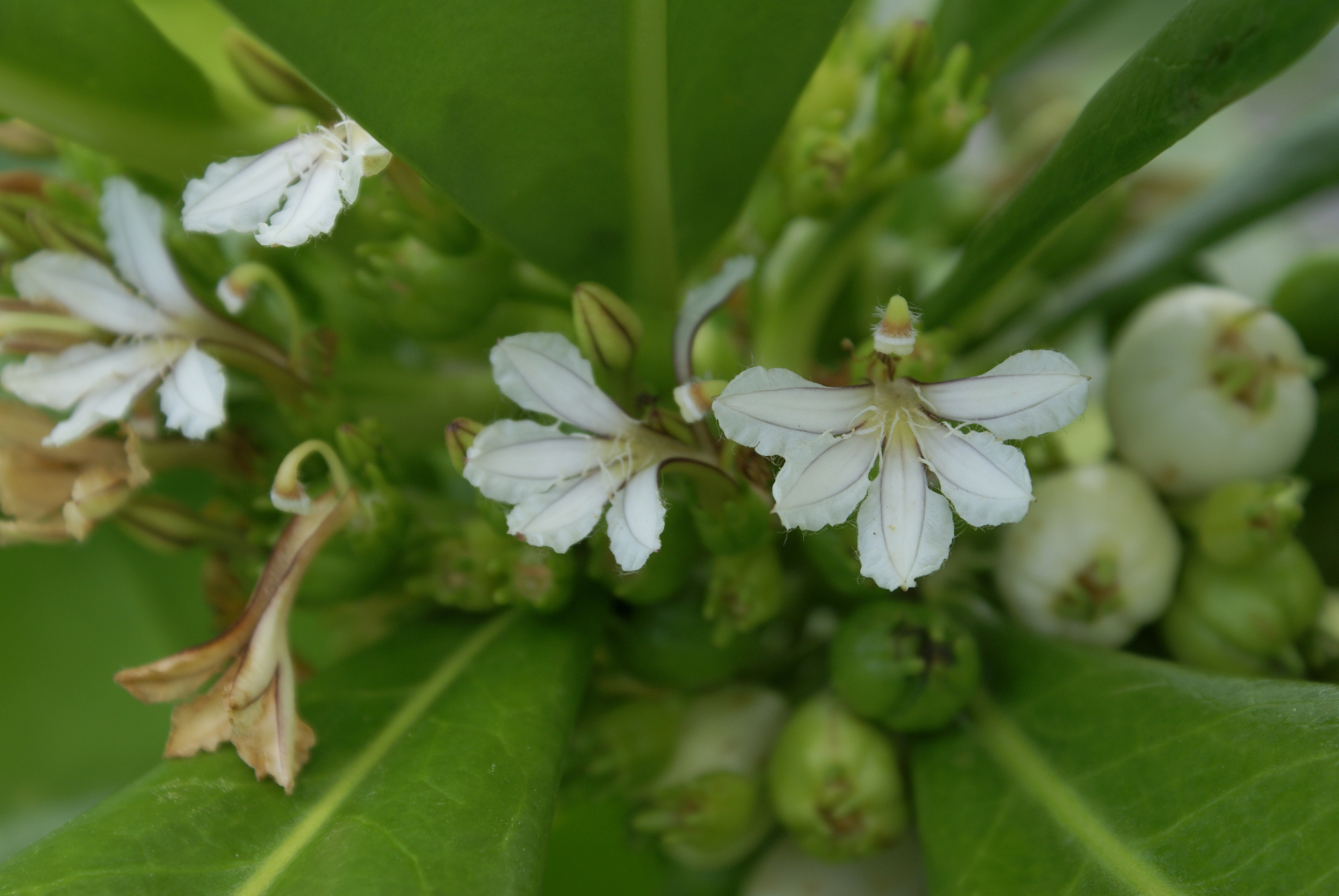
Flowers of beach naupaka (Scaevola taccada), Kiritimati's most typical woody plant.

=== Flora ===
The natural vegetation on Kiritimati consists mostly of low shrubland and grassland. What little woodland exists is mainly open coconut palm (Cocos nucifera) plantation. There are three small woods of catchbird trees (Pisonia grandis), at Southeast Point, Northwest Point, and on Motu Tabu. The latter was planted there in recent times. About 50 introduced plant species are found on Kiritimati; as most are plentiful around settlements, former military sites and roads, it seems that these only became established in the 20th century.

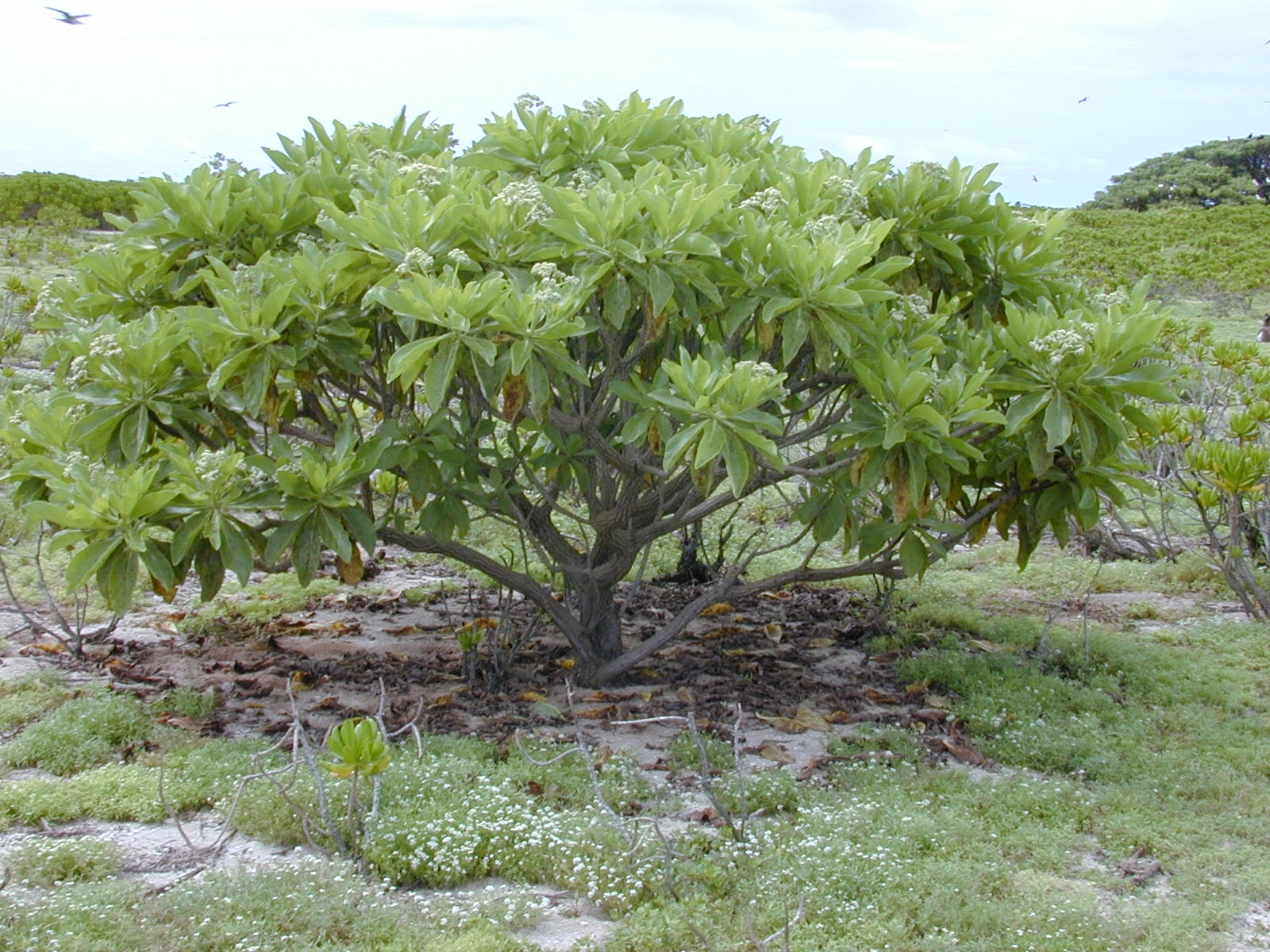
Tree heliotrope (Heliotropium foertherianum) in typical habitat on a Hawaiian island.

Beach naupaka (Scaevola taccada) is the most common shrub on Kiritimati; beach naupaka scrub dominates the vegetation on much of the island, either as pure stands or interspersed with tree heliotrope (Heliotropium foertherianum) and bay cedar (Suriana maritima). The latter species is dominant on the drier parts of the lagoon flats where it grows up to 2 m (6.6 ft) tall. Tree heliotrope is most commonly found a short distance from the sea- or lagoon-shore. In some places near the seashore, a low vegetation dominated by Polynesian heliotrope (Heliotropium anomalum), yellow purslane (Portulaca lutea) and common purslane (P. oleracea) is found. In the south and on the sandier parts, Sida fallax, also growing up to 2 m tall, is abundant. On the southeastern peninsula, S. fallax grows more stunted, and Polynesian heliotrope, yellow and common purslane as well as the spiderling Boerhavia repens, the parasitic vine Cassytha filiformis, and Pacific Island thintail (Lepturus repens) supplement it. The last species dominates in the coastal grasslands. The wetter parts of the lagoon shore are often covered by abundant growth of shoreline purslane (Sesuvium portulacastrum).

Perhaps the most destructive of the recently introduced plants is sweetscent (Pluchea odorata), a camphorweed, which is considered an invasive weed as it overgrows and displaces herbs and grasses. The introduced creeper Tribulus cistoides, despite having also spread conspicuously, is considered to be more beneficial than harmful to the ecosystem, as it provides good nesting sites for some seabirds.

=== Birds ===
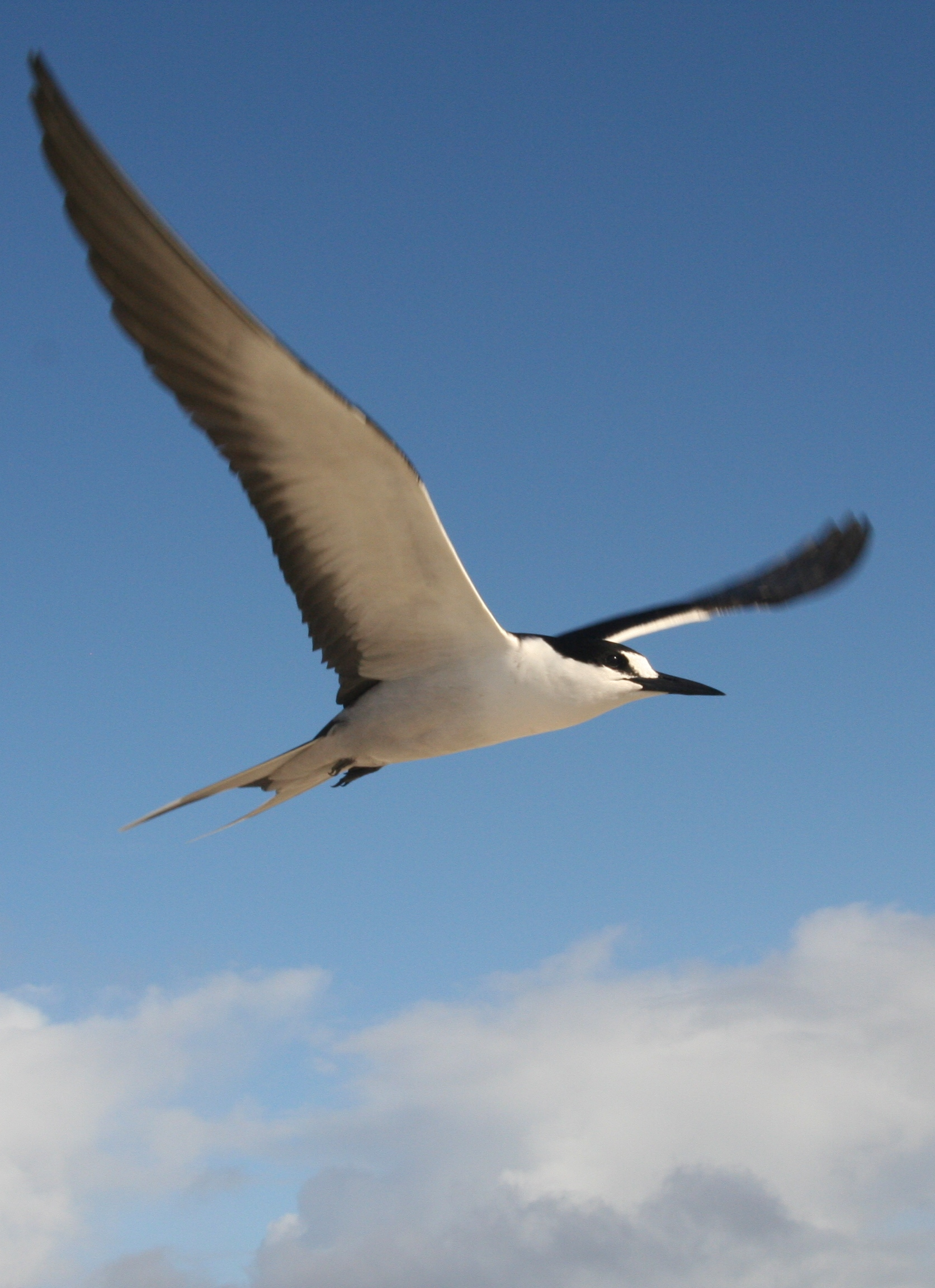
Despite massive declines in recent decades, more sooty terns continue to nest on Kiritimati than anywhere else in the world.

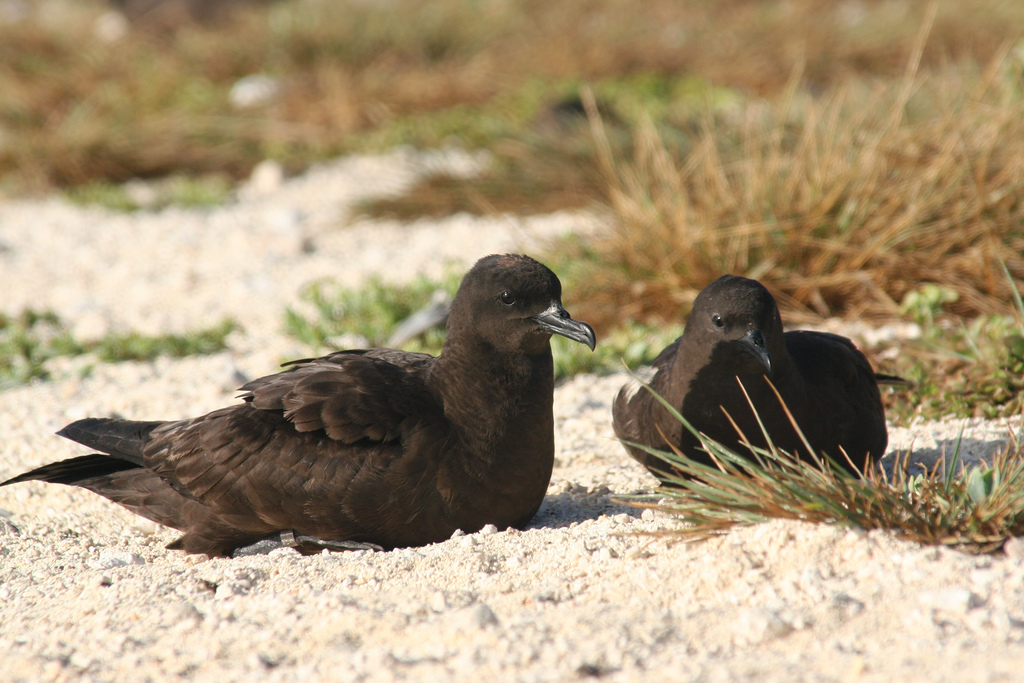
The Christmas shearwater was named after Kiritimati.

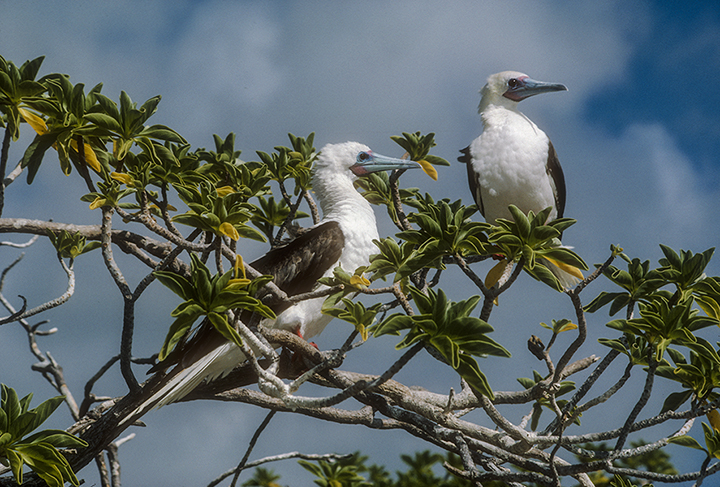
White-morph red-footed boobies. Those on Kiritimati will reuse nests for several years, unlike in most other colonies.

More than 35 bird species have been recorded from Kiritimati. As noted above, only the bokikokiko (Acrocephalus aequinoctialis), perhaps a few Rimitara lorikeets (Vini kuhlii) – if any remain at all – and the occasional eastern reef egret (Egretta sacra) make up the entire landbird fauna. About 1,000 adult bokikokikos are to be found at any date, but mainly in mixed grass/shrubland away from the settlements.

On the other hand, seabirds are plentiful on Kiritimati, and make up the bulk of the breeding bird population. There are 18 species of seabirds breeding on the island, and Kiritimati is one of the most important breeding grounds anywhere in the world for several of these:

Phaethontiformes

- Eastern red-tailed tropicbird (Phaethon rubricauda melanorhynchus (Note: Validity of subspecies disputed.)) – important breeding colony; 8,000 birds before the 1982–1983 decline, fewer than 3,000 in 1984

Charadriiformes

- Micronesian black noddy (Anous minutus marcusi) – 20,000 birds before the 1982–1983 decline
- Little white tern (Gygis microrhyncha (Note: Usually described as a sub-species Gygis alba microrhyncha)) – 8,000 birds before the 1982–1983 decline
- Central Pacific sooty tern (Onychoprion fuscatus oahuensis) – largest breeding colony in the world; around 7,000,000 birds before the 1982–1983 decline
- Spectacled tern (Onychoprion lunatus) – important breeding colony; 6,000 birds before the 1982–1983 decline
- Central blue-grey noddy (Procelsterna cerulea cerulea) – important breeding colony, possibly the largest worldwide of this subspecies; 4,000 birds before the 1982–1983 decline

Procellariiformes

- Polynesian storm petrel (Nesofregetta fuliginosa) – important breeding colony; 1,000 birds before the 1982–1983 decline
- Phoenix petrel (Pterodroma alba) – largest breeding colony in the world; 24,000 birds before the 1982–1983 decline
- Christmas shearwater (Puffinus nativitatis) – largest subpopulation worldwide on Motu Upua; 12,000 birds before the 1982–1983 decline
- Wedge-tailed shearwater (Puffinus pacificus) – among the very largest breeding colonies in the world; about 1,000,000 birds before the 1982–1983 decline

Pelecaniformes

- Indopacific lesser frigatebird (Fregata ariel ariel) – important breeding colony; 9,000 birds before the 1982–1983 decline
- Central Pacific great frigatebird (Fregata minor palmerstoni) – important breeding colony; 12,000 birds before the 1982–1983 decline, 6,500 afterwards
- Austropacific masked booby (Sula dactylatra personata) – important breeding colony; 3,000 birds before the 1982–1983 decline
- Indopacific red-footed booby (Sula sula rubripes) – 12,000 birds before the 1982–1983 decline

Kiritimati's lagoon and the saltflats are a prime location for migratory birds to stop over or even stay all winter. The most commonly seen migrants are ruddy turnstone (Arenaria interpres), Pacific golden plover (Pluvialis fulva), bristle-thighed curlew (Numenius tahitiensis), and wandering tattler (Tringa incana); other seabirds, waders, and even dabbling ducks can be encountered every now and then. Around 7 October (±5 days), some 20 million sooty shearwaters pass through here en route from the North Pacific feeding grounds to breeding sites around New Zealand.

=== Other fauna ===
The only mammals native to the region are the common Polynesian rat (Rattus exulans) and the goats. The rat seems to have been introduced by seafarers many centuries before Cook arrived in 1777 (he mentioned them already being present); goats have been extinct since 14 January 2004. Black rats (Rattus rattus) were present at some time, perhaps introduced by 19th-century sailors or during the nuclear tests. They were not able to gain a foothold between predation by cats and competitive exclusion by Polynesian rats, and no black rat population is found on Kiritimati today.

Up to 2,000 feral cats can in some years be found on the island; the population became established in the 19th century. Their depredations seriously harm the birdlife. Since the late 19th century, they have driven about 60% of the seabird species from the mainland completely, and during particular dry spells they will cross the mudflats and feast upon the birds on the motus. Spectacled tern chicks seem to be a favourite food of the local cat population. There are some measures being taken to ensure the cat population does not grow. That lowering the cat population by some amount would much benefit Christmas and its inhabitants is generally accepted, but the situation is too complex to simply go and eradicate them outright. A limited population of feral pigs exists. They were once plentiful and wreaked havoc especially on the Onychoprion and noddies. Pig hunting by locals has been encouraged, and was highly successful at limiting the pig population to a sustainable level, while providing a source of cheap protein for the islanders.

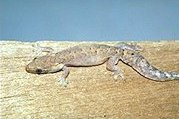
Mourning gecko, a common sight all over the tropical Pacific

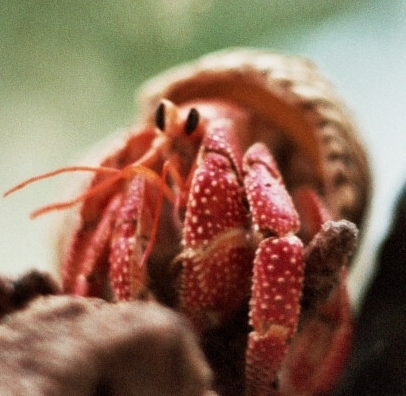
A strawberry land hermit crab in its shell

There are some "supertramp" lizards which have reached the island by their own means. Commonly seen are the mourning gecko (Lepidodactylus lugubris) and the skink Cryptoblepharus boutonii; the four-clawed gecko (Gehyra mutilata) is seen less often.

There are some crustaceans of note to be found on Kiritimati and in the waters immediately adjacent. The amphibious coconut crab (Birgus latro) is not as common as on Teraina. Ghost crabs (genus Ocypode), Cardisoma carnifex and Geograpsus grayi land crabs, the strawberry land hermit crab (Coenobita perlatus) are also notable. Introduced brine shrimp Artemia salina populate the island's saline ponds.

== Ecology of the reef ==
Overfishing and pollution have impacted on the ocean surrounding the island. In the ocean surrounding uninhabited islands of the Northern Line Islands, sharks comprised 74% of the top predator biomass (329 g/m^{2}) at Kingman Reef and 57% at Palmyra Atoll (97 g/m^{2}), whereas low shark numbers have been observed at Tabuaeran and Kiritimati.

Green turtles (Chelonia mydas) regularly nest in small numbers on Kiritimati. The lagoon is famous among sea anglers worldwide for its bonefish (Albula glossodonta), and has been stocked with Oreochromis tilapia to decrease overfishing of marine species. Though the tilapias thrive in brackish water of the flats, they will not last long should they escape into the surrounding ocean.

Giant trevally (Caranx ignobilis) are found in large numbers both inside and outside of the lagoon and along the surrounding reefs. Very large specimens of giant trevally can be found around these surrounding reefs and they are sought after by many fishermen in addition to bonefish.

== Conservation and extinction ==
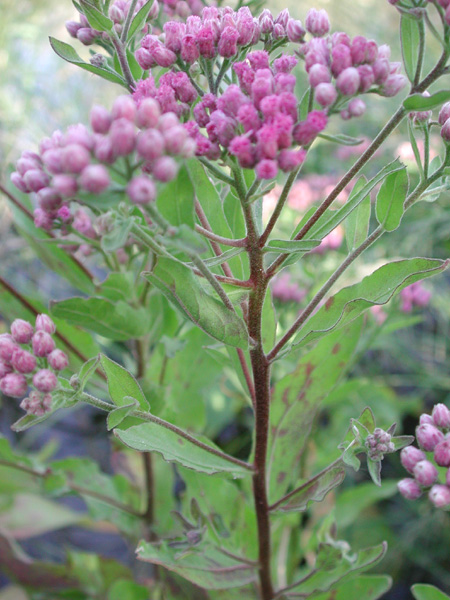
Sweetscent (Pluchea odorata) has become a serious weed in parts of Kiritimati.

In December 1960, the British colonial authority gazetted Kiritimati as a bird sanctuary under the "Gilbert and Ellice Island Colony Wild Birds Protection Ordinance" of 1938. Access to Cook Island, Motu Tabu, and Motu Upua was restricted. Kiritimati was declared a Wildlife Sanctuary in May 1975, in accordance with the Wildlife Conservation Ordinance of the then self-governing colony. Ngaontetaake and the sooty tern breeding grounds at North West Point also became restricted-access zones. Two years later, active conservation measures got underway.

To a limited extent, permits to enter the restricted areas for purposes like research or small-scale ecotourism are given. Kiribati's Wildlife Conservation Unit participates in the Kiritimati Development Committee and the Local Land Planning Board, and there exists an integrated program of wildlife conservation and education. New Zealand is a major sponsor of conservation efforts on Kiritimati.

=== Former egg gathering ===
Egg collecting for food on a massive scale was frequent in the past but is now outlawed. The sooty terns for example could sustain occasional collection of effectively all of a season's eggs (over 10 million), if given sufficient time to recover and if cats are absent. In theory, even egg collecting on a scale that significantly decreases costly food imports could be possible, but not until the cat and rat populations have been brought under control. Poaching remains a concern; with the population rising and spreading out on Kiritimati, formerly remote bird colonies have become more accessible; the red-tailed tropicbirds and the Sula especially are strongly affected by hunting and disturbance. Tropicbirds are mainly poached for their feathers, which are used in local arts and handicraft; it would certainly be possible to obtain them from living birds as was routinely done at the height of the Polynesian civilisation.

=== Feral cats ===
It may seem that the former numbers of seabirds may only ever be approached again by the wholesale eradication of the feral cats. While this has been since shown to be feasible, (Note: e.g. on remote and rugged subantarctic Marion Island with 290 km^{2} (110 sq mi) land area.) it is not clear whether even a severe curtailing of the cat population would be desirable: Though it previously was assumed that the small Polynesian rat is of little, if any, harm to seabirds, even house mice have been shown to eat seabird nestlings. Most nesting birds, in particularly Procellariiformes, are now accepted to be jeopardised by Rattus exulans. Kiritimati's cats meanwhile, are very fond of young seabirds; it even seems that their behaviour shifts accordingly, with cats being generally less territorial, and congregating in numbers at active bird colonies; they generally eschew hunting rats when seabird chicks are in plenty.

Possession of an unneutered female cat on Kiritimati is illegal, and owners need to prevent their domestic cats from running wild (such animals are usually quickly killed in traps set for this purpose). Nighttime cat hunting has made little effect on the cat population. As noted above, vigorous protection of active nesting grounds from cats by traps and poison, supplemented by shooting, while otherwise leaving them alone to hunt rats may well be the optimal solution.

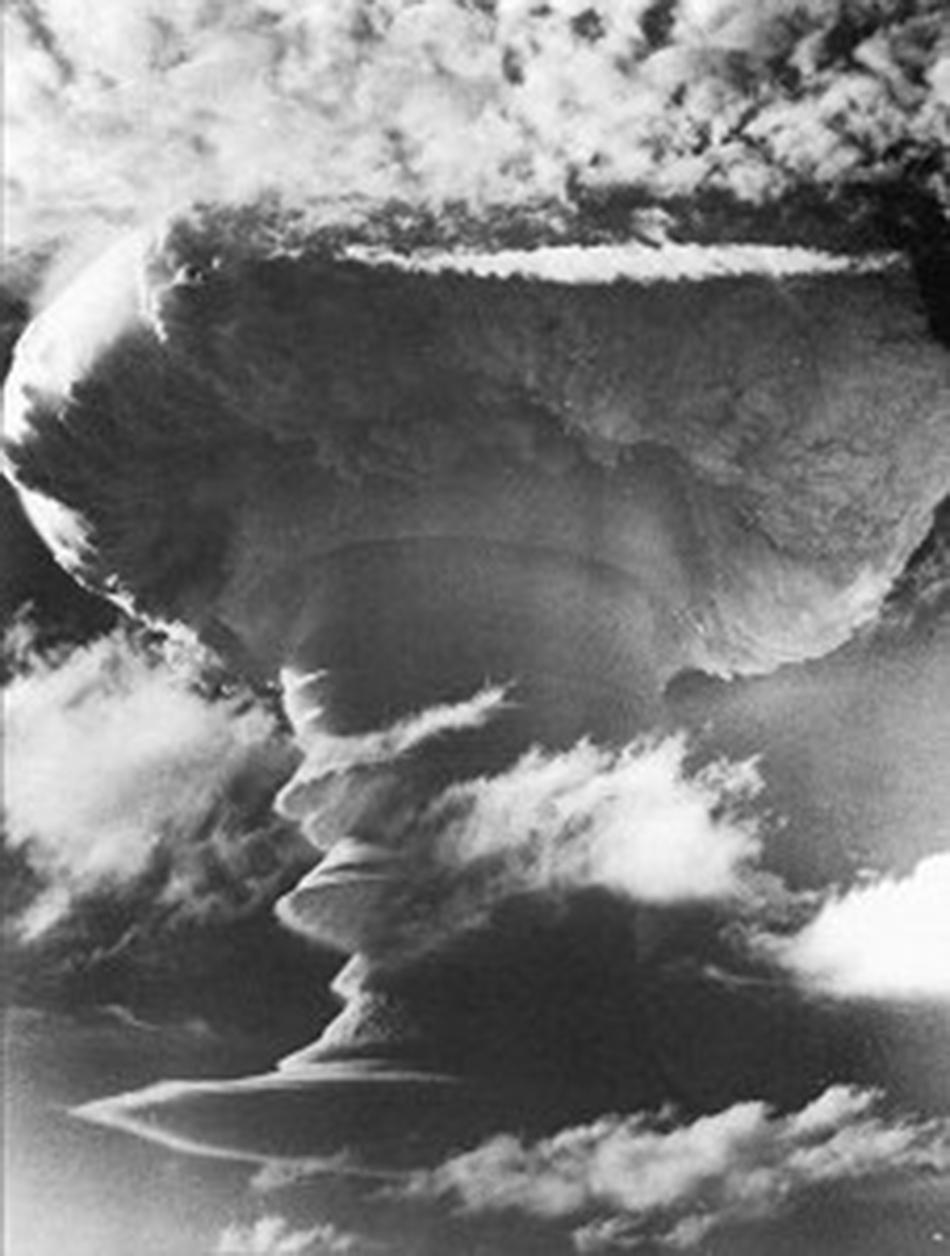
8 November 1957 Grapple X Round C1 – the first successful British hydrogen bomb test – detonates over Kiritimati's South East Point.

=== Radiation hazards ===
There is no reliable data on the environmental and public health impact of the nuclear tests conducted on the island in the late 1950s. A 1975 study claimed that there was negligible radiation hazard; certainly, fallout was successfully minimised. More recently however, a Massey University study of New Zealand found chromosomal translocations to be increased about threefold on average in veterans who participated in the tests; most of the relevant data remains classified to date.

=== 1982–1983 El Niño ===
The 1982–1983 "mega-El Niño" devastated seabird populations on Kiritimati. In some species, mortality rose to 90% and breeding success dropped to zero during that time.

In general, El Niño conditions will cause seabird populations to drop, taking several years to recover at the present density of predators. Global warming impact on Kiritimati is thus unpredictable. El Niño events seem to become shorter but more frequent in a warmer climate.

=== Climate change ===
Much of the island's infrastructure and habitation, with the notable exception of the airport area, is located to the leeward and thus somewhat protected from storms.

A rising sea level does not appear to be particularly problematic; the increasing flooding of the subsidiary lagoons would provide easily observed forewarning, and might even benefit seabird populations by making the motus less accessible to predators. In fact, geological data suggests that Kiritimati has withstood prehistoric sea level changes well.

The biggest danger caused by a changing climate would seem to be more prolonged and/or severe droughts, which could even precipitate the island's abandonment (as happened in 1905). However, it is not clear how weather patterns would change, and it may be that precipitation increases.

=== Extinction ===
The type specimen of the Tuamotu sandpiper (Prosobonia cancellata) was collected on Christmas Island in 1778, probably on 1 or 2 January, during Captain Cook's visit. The expedition's naturalist William Anderson observed the bird, and it was painted by William Ellis (linked below). The single specimen was in Joseph Banks's collection at the end of the 18th century, but later was lost or destroyed. There is some taxonomic dispute regarding the Kiritimati population.

As all Prosobonia seem(ed) to be resident birds, unwilling to undertake long-distance migrations, an appropriate treatment would be to consider the extinct population the nominate subspecies, as Prosobonia cancellata cancellata or Kiritimati sandpiper, distinct from the surviving Tuamotu Islands population more than 2,000 km (1,200 mi) to the southeast. It may have been, but probably was not, limited to Kiritimati; while no remains have been found, little fieldwork has been conducted, and judging from the Tuamotu sandpiper's habits, almost all Line Islands would have offered suitable habitat.

The Kiritimati population of P. cancellata disappeared in the earlier part of the 19th century or so, almost certainly due to predation by introduced mammals. While Prosobonia generally manage to hold their own against Polynesian rats, they are highly vulnerable to the black rat and feral cats. Given the uncertainties surrounding the introduction date and maximum population of the former, the cats seem to be the main culprits in the Kiritimati sandpiper's extinction.

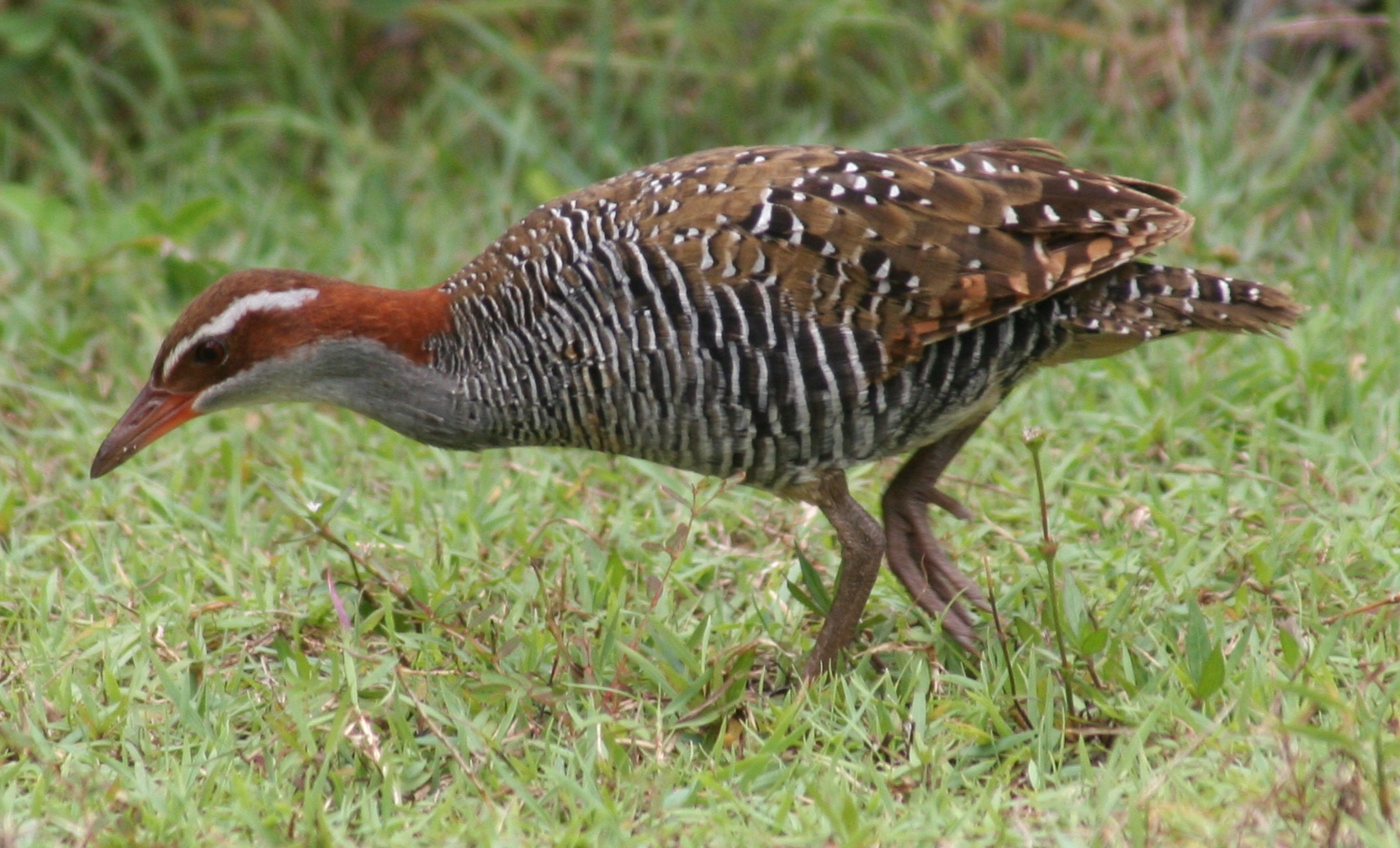
The buff-banded rail (Gallirallus philippensis) might once have had a similar-looking relative on Kiritimati.

Given that the island was apparently settled to some extent in prehistoric times, it may have already lost bird species then. The geological data indicates that Kiritimati is very old and was never completely underwater in the Holocene at least; thus it might have once harboured highly distinct wetland birds.

The limited overall habitat diversity on Kiritimati nonetheless limits the range of such hypothetical taxa, as does biogeography due to its remote location. At least one, possibly several Gallirallus and / or Porzana rails make the most likely candidates, given their former presence in the region, and that conditions on Kiritimati would seem well suited. Perhaps a Todiramphus kingfisher was also present; such a bird would probably have belonged to the sacred kingfisher (T. sanctus) group, as that species today occurs as a vagrant in Micronesia, and related forms are resident in southeastern Polynesia. These birds would have fallen victim to the Polynesian rat. In the case of the rails (which would have almost certainly been flightless) hunting by occasionally resident Polynesians, in addition to predation by the imported rats, likely contributed to their extinction.

== See also ==
- Bay of Wrecks
- List of Guano Island claims
- Lists of islands
- Ministry of Line and Phoenix Islands Development
