= Subdivisions of Kiribati =

List of local councils in Kiribati

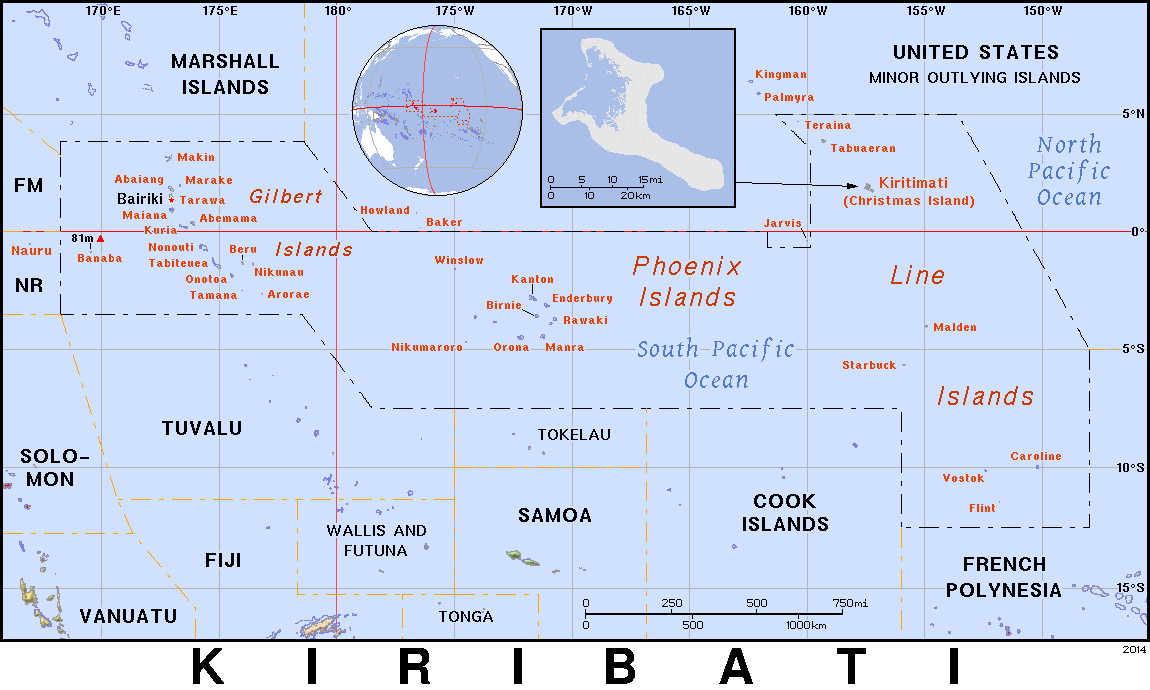
Map of the islands of Kiribati

In Kiribati, there are no longer official administrative divisions but it is possible to divide Kiribati geographically into one isolated island and three archipelagos or island groups:

- Banaba – isolated island
- Gilbert Islands
- Line Islands
- Phoenix Islands

Kiribati was divided into six districts before gaining independence:

- Banaba
- Tarawa
- Northern Gilbert Islands
- Central Gilbert Island
- Southern Gilbert Islands
- Line Islands

Four of the former districts (including Tarawa) lie in the Gilbert Islands, where 90% of the country's population lives. Only three of the Line Islands are inhabited, while the Phoenix Islands are uninhabited apart from Canton Island (20 people) and had no official representation. Banaba itself is sparsely inhabited now (330 people in 2020). There is also a representative non-elected of the Banabans relocated since 1945 to Rabi Island in the country of Fiji.

== Local councils ==
There are 21 inhabited islands in Kiribati. Each inhabited island has its own council(s). Two atolls have more than one local council: Tarawa has three and Tabiteuea has two, for a total of 24 local councils.

John Hilary Smith as the Governor, created the three councils of Tarawa, in 1972.

Banaba

1. Banaba

Tarawa

1. Betio Town Council (BTC) of South Tarawa
2. Eutan Tarawa Council (ETC) of North Tarawa
3. Teinainano Urban Council (TUC) of South Tarawa

Northern Gilbert Islands

1. Abaiang
2. Butaritari
3. Makin
4. Marakei

Central Gilbert Islands

1. Abemama
2. Aranuka
3. Kuria
4. Maiana

Southern Gilbert Islands

1. Arorae
2. Beru
3. Nikunau
4. Nonouti
5. North Tabiteuea (Tabiteuea)
6. Onotoa
7. South Tabiteuea (Tabiteuea)
8. Tamana

Phoenix Islands

1. Canton

Line Islands

1. Kiritimati
2. Tabuaeran
3. Teraina

== See also ==
- ISO 3166-2:KI
- List of islands of Kiribati
