= UTC+14:00 =

Time offset from UTC of +14

- Time zone
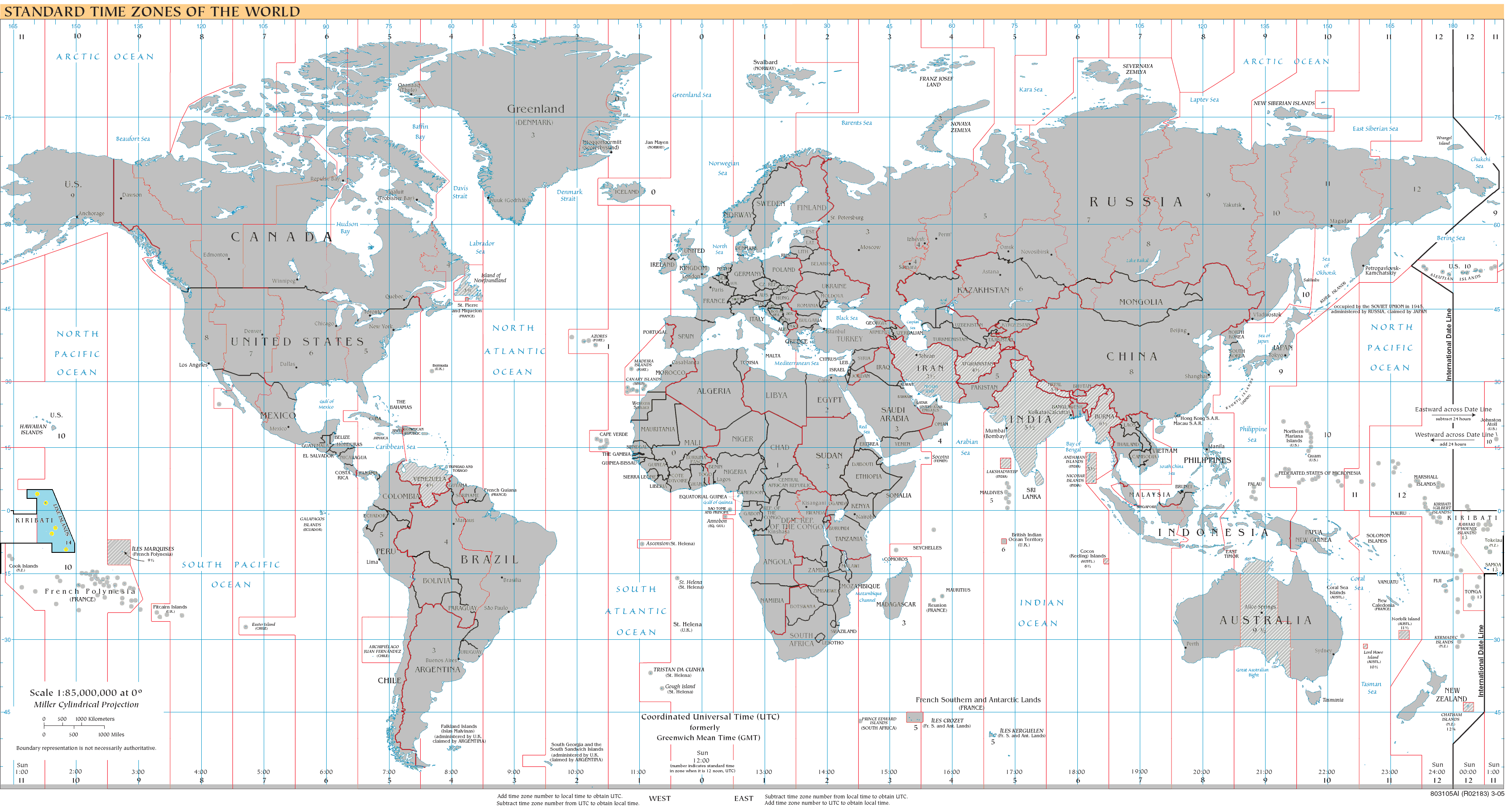
- World map with the time zone highlighted

UTC offset
- UTC: UTC+14:00

Current time
- 01:57, 9 October 2026 UTC+14:00 [refresh]

Central meridian
- 150 degrees W

UTC+14:00 is an identifier for a time offset from UTC of +14:00. This is the earliest time zone on Earth, meaning that areas in this zone are the first to see a new day, and therefore the first to enter a New Year. It is also referred to as the "latest time zone" on Earth, as clocks in it always show the 'latest' (i.e., most advanced) time of all time zones.

UTC+14:00 stretches as far as 30° east of the 180° longitude line and creates a large fold in the International Date Line around the Pacific nation of Kiribati.

== As standard time (year-round) ==
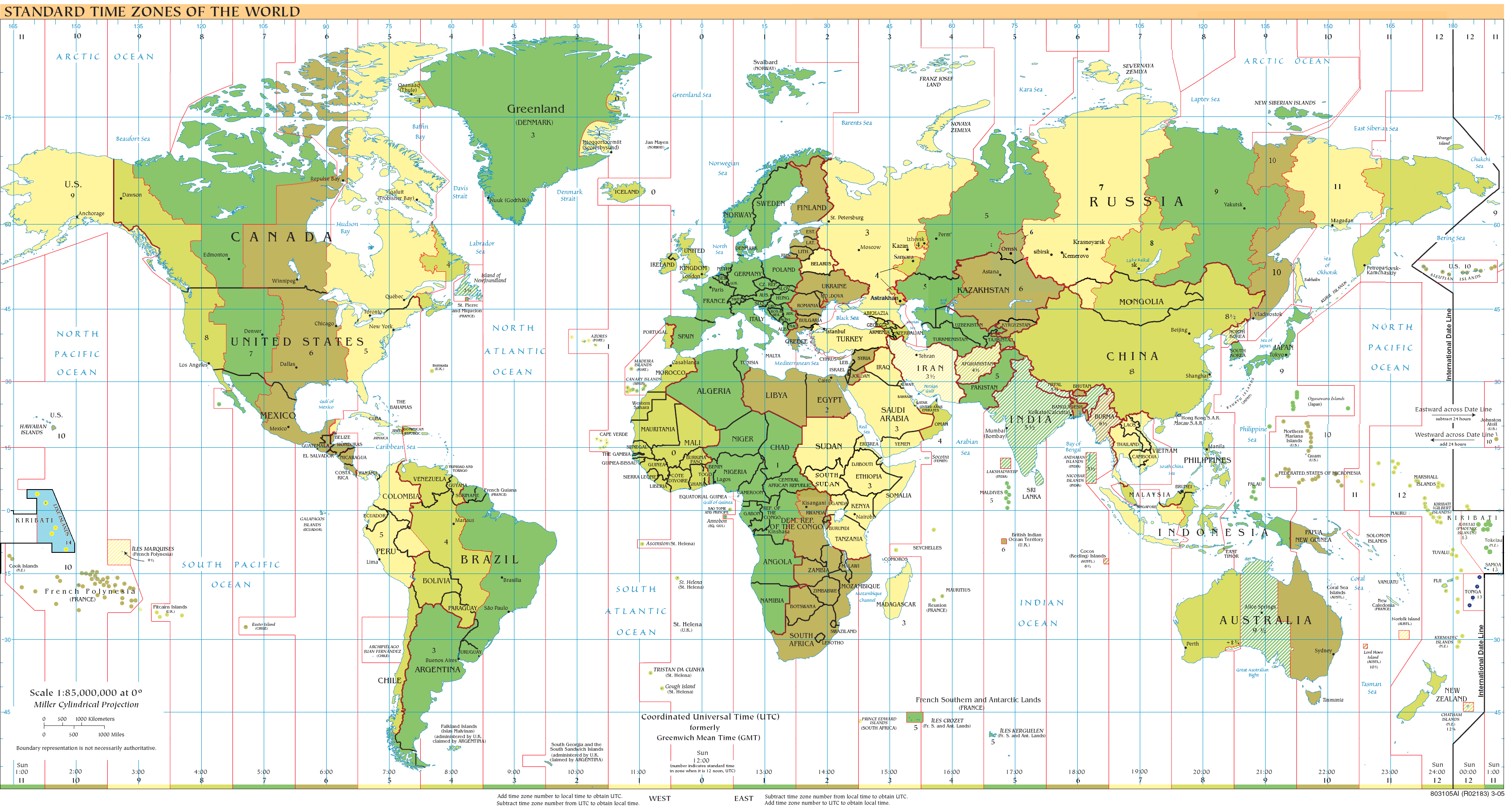
UTC+14:00: blue (December), orange (June), yellow (year-round), light blue (sea areas)

Principal settlement: Kiritimati

=== Oceania ===
- Kiribati
  - Line Islands

== History ==
The central Pacific Republic of Kiribati introduced a change of date for its eastern half on 31 December 1994, from time zones UTC−11:00 and UTC−10:00 to UTC+13:00 and UTC+14:00. Before this, the time zones UTC+13:00 and UTC+14:00 did not exist. As a British colony, Kiribati was centred in the Gilbert Islands, just west of the old date line. The distant Phoenix and Line Islands were on the other side of the date line. Government offices on opposite sides of the line could only communicate by radio or telephone on the four days of the week when both sides experienced weekdays simultaneously.

The revision of Kiribati's time zone meant that the date line in effect moved eastwards to go around this country, so that the Line Islands, including the inhabited Kiritimati island, started the year 2000 on its territory before any other country on Earth, a feature the Kiribati government capitalized on as a potential tourist draw.

Tonga – IANA time zone database zone name Pacific/Tongatapu – used UTC+14:00 for daylight saving time from 1999 to 2002 and 2016 to 2017. Therefore, Tonga celebrated new year 2000 at the same time as the Line Islands in Kiribati.

At the end of 29 December 2011 (UTC−10:00), Samoa advanced its standard time from UTC−11:00 to UTC+13:00 (and its daylight saving time from UTC−10:00 to UTC+14:00 until 4 April 2021), essentially moving the international date line to the other side of the country.

Alaska had local times corresponding to between UTC+11:30 and UTC+15:10 until 1867 (24 hours were deducted in 1867 to make the date correspond to rest of United States). These times were local mean times and not time zones.

UTC+13:00 was used as a daylight time before 1982 in the parts of very eastern Russia (Chukotka) that used Kamchatka Time.

== See also ==
- Time in Kiribati
- Time in Alaska
- Time in Russia
- UTC−10:00, which is exactly one day behind UTC+14:00.
- UTC−12:00, the last time zone to start a new day
