= Line Islands =

Island chain in Polynesia

Native name: Teraina Islands

- Location within Kiribati Location within Oceania Location within Pacific Ocean

Geography
- Location: Pacific Ocean
- Coordinates: 1.7°N 157.2°W
- Total islands: 11
- Area: 503.28 km^{2} (194.32 sq mi)
- Kiribati
- Administrative division: None
- Largest island settlement: Kiritimati (pop. 7,369 (2020))
- United States
- Territories: Incorporated; Palmyra Atoll; Unincorporated; Jarvis Island; Kingman Reef

The Line Islands, also known as the Teraina Islands or the Equatorial Islands (Gilbertese: Aono Raina), are a chain of 11 atolls (with partly or fully enclosed lagoons, except Vostok and Jarvis) and coral islands (with a surrounding reef) in the central Pacific Ocean, in the Polynesia sub-region of Oceania south of the Hawaiian Islands. Eight of the atolls are parts of Kiribati. The remaining three—Jarvis Island, Kingman Reef, and Palmyra Atoll—are territories of the United States grouped with the United States Minor Outlying Islands.

The Line Islands, all of which were formed by volcanic activity, are one of the longest island chains in the world, stretching 2,350 km (1,460 mi) from northwest to southeast. One of them, Starbuck Island, is near the geographic centre of the Pacific Ocean (4°58′S 158°45′W). Another, Kiritimati, has the largest land area of any atoll in the world. Only Kiritimati, Tabuaeran, and Teraina have a permanent population. The islands had no permanent inhabitants until European colonisation and the current inhabitants descend from the Micronesian Gilbertese people despite the islands' location in the Polynesian Triangle. Besides the 11 confirmed atolls and islands, Filippo Reef is shown on some maps, but its existence is doubted.

The International Date Line passes through the Line Islands. The ones that are parts of Kiribati are in the world's farthest forward time zone, UTC+14:00. The time of day in these atolls is 24 hours ahead of the state of Hawaii in the United States, which uses UTC−10:00, and 26 hours ahead of some other islands in Oceania, such as Baker Island, which uses UTC−12:00.

== Overview ==
Copra and pet fish are the islands' main export products (along with seaweed).

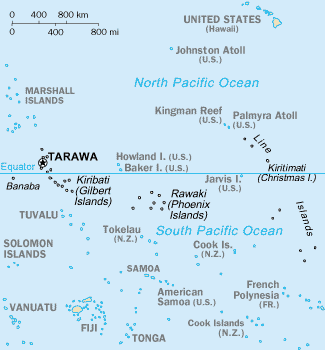
Map

Archaeologists have identified the remains of coral Marae platforms and/or village complexes on several of the islands, including the Kiritimati and Tabuaeran atolls, Teraina Island, Malden, Millennium Atoll and Flint Island. These remains are dateable as far back as the 14th century, and show that the inhabitants of the Line Islands were likely permanent or at least semi-permanent.

Most 18th-century visitors to these isles overlooked these telltale signs of former Polynesian settlement. This included Captain Cook, who landed on Christmas Island (now called Kiritimati) in 1777, as well as Captain Fanning, who visited Teraina (Washington Island) and Tabuaeran (Fanning Atoll) in 1798.

In the 19th century, whaling ships were regular visitors to the islands. They came in search of water, wood and provisions. The first whaler recorded to have visited one of them was the Coquette, which docked at Kiritimati (then called Christmas Island) in 1822.

In 1888, the United Kingdom was planning to lay the Pacific cable, and annexed the islands with a view to using Tabuaeran (then Fanning Island) as one of the relay stations for the cable. The cable was laid and was operational between 1902 and 1963 (except for a short period in 1914).

In 1916, the British annexed Fanning and Washington islands, making them part of the British colony of the Gilbert and Ellice Islands. In 1919, they annexed Christmas Island to the same colony. The Line Islands occasionally featured briefly in the biennial reports furnished by the Colony's resident commissioner to the Colonial Office and Parliament in London (see, for example, the reports submitted in 1966 and 1967).

The United States contested the British annexations, based on the U.S. Guano Islands Act of 1856, which allowed for very wide-ranging territorial claims. It relinquished these claims only in 1979, when it entered into the Treaty of Tarawa, which recognised Kiribati's sovereignty over the majority of the Line Islands chain.

== List of atolls, islands and reefs ==
Geographically, the Line Islands is divided into three subgroups: the Northern, Central, and Southern Line Islands (however, the Central Line Islands are sometimes grouped with the Southern Line Islands). The table below lists the islands from north to south.

Atoll / Island / Reef	Area (km^{2})		Population	Coordinates	Status
Atoll / Island / Reef	Land	Lagoon	Population	Coordinates	Status
Northern Line Islands (Fanning's Group)
Kingman Reef	0.01	60	0	6°24′N 162°24′W	U.S. territory (unincorporated)
Palmyra Atoll	3.9	8	4	5°52′N 162°6′W	U.S. territory (incorporated)
Teraina (Washington Island)	9.55	2^{*}	1,155	4°43′N 160°24′W	A part of Kiribati
Tabuaeran (Fanning Island)	33.73	110	2,539	3°52′N 159°22′W	A part of Kiribati
Kiritimati (Christmas Island)	388.39	217.61	5,115	1°53′N 157°24′W	A part of Kiribati
Central Line Islands
Jarvis Island	5	—	0	0°22′S 160°03′W	U.S. territory (unincorporated)
Malden Island	39.3	13^{*}	0	4°01′S 154°59′W	A part of Kiribati
Filippo Reef (existence uncertain)	—	1.5	0	5°30′S 151°50′W	Outside the I-Kiribati EEZ
Starbuck Island	16.2	4^{*}	0	5°37′S 155°56′W	A part of Kiribati
Southern Line Islands
Millennium Island (Caroline Island)	3.76	6.3	0	9°57′S 150°13′W	A part of Kiribati
Vostok Island	0.24	—	0	10°03′43″S 152°18′46″W	A part of Kiribati
Flint Island	3.2	0.01^{*}	0	11°26′S 151°48′W	A part of Kiribati
Line Islands	503.28	422.42	8,813		

Note:

^{*}The lagoon areas marked with an asterisk are included in the land areas of the previous column because, unlike typical lagoons in atolls, they are inland waters completely sealed off from the sea.

== Time zone realignment ==
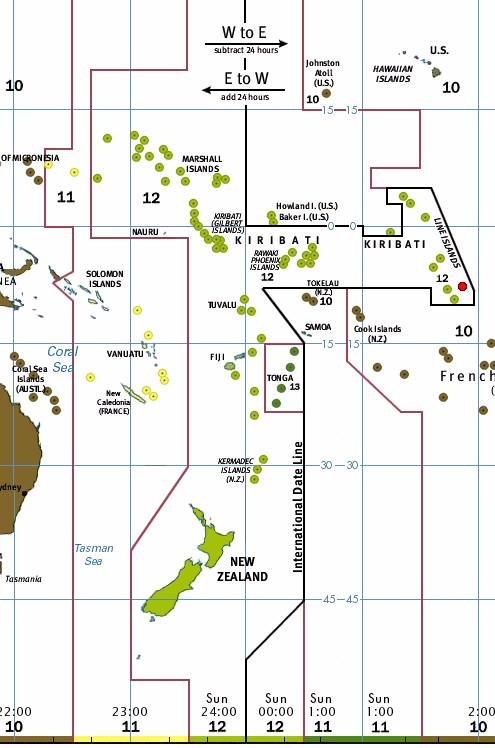
Following a 1995 time zone realignment, Millennium Island, then Caroline Island (red dot at far east of map), became the easternmost land west of the International Date Line.

On 23 December 1994, the Republic of Kiribati announced a change of time zone for the Line Islands, to take effect from 31 December 1994. This adjustment effectively moved the International Date Line more than 1,000 km (620 mi) to the east within Kiribati, which placed all of Kiribati on the Asian or western side of the date line, despite the fact that Millennium Island's longitude of 150 degrees west corresponds to UTC−10:00 rather than to its official time zone of UTC+14:00. Millennium Island is now at the same time as the Hawaiian Islands (Hawaii–Aleutian Time Zone), but one day ahead. This move made Millennium Island (then Caroline Island) the easternmost land in the earliest time zone (by some definitions, the easternmost point on Earth), and one of the first points of land which saw sunrise on 1 January 2000 – at 5:43 am, as measured by local time.

The move was the fulfilment of a campaign promise by Kiribati President Teburoro Tito. Previously, the country straddled the Date Line, thus being constantly in two different days. Kiribati officials later capitalised on the nation's new status as owners of the first land to see sunrise in 2000. Other Pacific nations, including Tonga and New Zealand's Chatham Islands, protested the move, objecting that it interfered with their own claims to be the first land to see dawn in the year 2000.

In 1999, to further capitalise upon the massive public interest in celebrations marking the arrival of the year 2000, Caroline Island was officially renamed Millennium Island. Although the island is uninhabited, a special celebration was held there to mark the occasion. It featured performances by native Kiribati entertainers and was attended by Kiribati's President Tito. Over 70 Kiribati singers and dancers travelled to Millennium Island from the capital, South Tarawa, accompanied by approximately 25 journalists. The celebration, which was broadcast worldwide by satellite, had an estimated audience size of as many as one billion viewers.

== See also ==
- List of islands in the Pacific Ocean
- Polynesian Triangle
