= Kiribati nationality law =

Kiribati nationality law is regulated by the 1979 Constitution of Kiribati, as amended; the 1979 Citizenship Act, and its revisions; and various British Nationality laws. These laws determine who is, or is eligible to be, a national of Kiribati. I-Kiribati nationality is typically obtained either on the principle of jus soli, i.e. by birth in Kiribati or under the rules of jus sanguinis, i.e. by birth abroad to parents with Kiribati nationality. It can be granted to persons with an affiliation to the country, or to a permanent resident who has lived in the country for a given period of time through naturalisation. Nationality establishes one's international identity as a member of a sovereign nation. Though it is not synonymous with citizenship, for rights granted under domestic law for domestic purposes, the United Kingdom, and thus the Commonwealth, have traditionally used the words interchangeably.

Citizens of Kiribati are also Commonwealth citizens as well.

== Acquisition ==
Nationality in Kiribati is acquired at birth, or later in life by registration or naturalisation.

=== By birth ===
Persons who acquire nationality at birth include:

- Persons born in Kiribati provided that the father, if legitimate, or mother, if illegitimate, do not hold diplomatic immunity or are not members of an occupying army;
- Persons not of I-Kiribati descent, who are born in the territory and have no entitlement to be a national of any other country;
- Persons born abroad to a native-born Kiribati father, or native-born mother if the birth is illegitimate and the father is unknown, whose birth is registered with the proper authorities; or
- Foundlings.

=== By registration ===
Nationality by registration includes those who have familial or historic relationship affiliations with Kiribati. Persons who acquire nationality by registration include:

- Minor children who have been adopted by nationals of Kiribati, with the exception that in the case of a joint adoption, the father must be I-Kiribati;
- Minor children of a person who has become a naturalised I-Kiribati;
- Foreign wives of I-Kiribati husbands; or (Note: Women are unable to have foreign husbands derive their nationality or be registered upon marriage. Kiribati is the only country in Oceania that retains gender discrimination in its nationality laws.)
- Persons who are descended from ancestors who were Kiribati;

=== By naturalisation ===
Regular naturalisation in Kiribati is acquired by submitting an application to the Citizenship Commission, which is responsible for immigration. Applicants must verify that they are of good character; have familiarity with the language, customs, and civil duties of the country; are financially self-sufficient; and intend to reside in the territory. They must be able to demonstrate residence in the country for a minimum of seven years. Applicants who are approved for naturalisation are required to renounce other nationality. (Note: Kiribati retains a provision that a woman who formerly lost her nationality by virtue of marriage can apply for naturalisation if the marriage has terminated.)

== Loss of nationality ==
Kiribati nationals may renounce their nationality provided they have legal majority and capacity and have obtained other nationality, though in times of war, the renunciation may not be allowed Denaturalisation may occur only for those not of I-Kiribati descent, if a person obtained nationality through fraud, false representation, or concealment; if they serve in a foreign military or government; if they exercise rights or privileges granted by a foreign state; or if they voluntarily obtain foreign nationality.

== Dual nationality ==
All persons of I-Kiribati descent may be dual nationals, but naturalised persons who have no I-Kiribati heritage must renounce any other nationality.

== History ==
=== Pre-colonial period (1606–1915) ===
The Kingsmill Islands, later known as the Gilbert Islands and Kiribati, were reported as sighted by Pedro Fernandes de Queirós, a Portuguese navigator who sailed in service to Spain, in 1606. Various Spanish sightings were reported by sailors throughout the next centuries, before John Byron made landfall on Nikunau in 1765. Most of the islands in the archipelago formed by the Gilbert and Ellice Islands were identified as a result of commercial trading expeditions between the seventeenth and nineteenth century. In 1820, a Russian cartographer, Adam von Krusenstern compiled the known information on the Pacific Islands and renamed the entire archipelago, the Gilbert Islands, which did not come into common use until the 1860s. Governance of the islands was defined by a hierarchy centralised under a chiefdom, and flowing down to family members of the chief, free persons, slaves, and foreigners. The chief and his associates controlled the power over village land and life, and his subjects acknowledged his authority through tributes. Clan heads, traced by descent through the male line, were members of the maneaba, or meetinghouse, which served as the political forum and arbitrated disputes among clans. Women upon marriage became members of the clan of their husband.

From the early part of the 19th century, there were conflicts among European powers, who were establishing spheres of influence in the Pacific. British policy was to avoid annexation but to intervene on behalf of its nationals if conflict arose and through show of force, intimidate local leaders. Trading contacts with Europeans in the Gilbert Islands were sporadic throughout the 1840s and 1850s, centering on the whaling industry. The first European settlers were traders, but missionaries, like Hiram Bingham, arrived in Abaiang in 1857, soon followed them. Beginning in the 1860s Europeans traded for coconut oil and copra and conducted raids on native populations to secure workers for plantations in Fiji, Hawaii, Queensland, and as far away as South America. In 1877 the Governor-General of Fiji was given extended powers as High Commissioner to take responsibility for all British subjects in any Western Pacific Island not within the jurisdiction of another "civilized power".

In 1886, Germany and Britain signed the Anglo-German Declarations about the Western Pacific Ocean to establish terms of their interaction and delineate the territories with which each was aligned. Despite the accord, Germany continued attempts to control the Gilbert Islands and in 1888, petitioned the government to annex them. Eager to gain German support to buffer French hostility for British involvement in Egypt, the Foreign Office rejected annexation. The Colonial Office recognised the need to take pre-emptive action because of growing involvement of the United States in the region. To limit the cost and permanence of a colony, the Cabinet declared the Gilbert Islands a British protectorate in 1892, allowing the existing government to operate under British supervision. Later that year, the same status was extended to the Ellice Islands. Charles Swayne was appointed as the Resident Commissioner and upon arriving in the islands in 1893, formalised the customary social organisation, granting chiefs and elders leadership authority, and establishing a court and policing system, and a secretary-treasurer to monitor taxation. He also codified existing laws and developed a common legal code for all of the islands.

In 1900, when phosphate was discovered on Ocean Island, the Resident Commissioner of the Gilbert Island Protectorate was extended in 1901, supervisory authority over that island as well. As most of the revenue for administrating the islands came from phosphate mining, the headquarters for the Protectorate moved to Ocean Island in 1908. Concerns that the extensive mining operations would eventually render Ocean Island uninhabitable propelled authorities in 1912 to begin discussing consolidation of the islands into a single jurisdiction under British control. In 1915, an Order in Council changed the Protectorate to the Gilbert and Ellice Islands Colony.

=== British colony (1915–1979) ===
The British Nationality and Status of Aliens Act 1914 allowed local jurisdictions in the self-governing Dominions to continue regulating nationality in their territories, but also established an imperial nationality scheme throughout the realm. The uniform law, which went into effect on 1 January 1915, required a married woman to derive her nationality from her spouse, meaning if he was British, she was also, and if he was foreign, so was she. It stipulated that upon loss of nationality of a husband, a wife could declare that she wished to remain British and provided that if a marriage had terminated, through death or divorce, a British-born national who had lost her status through marriage could reacquire British nationality through naturalisation without meeting a residency requirement. The statute reiterated common law provisions for natural-born persons, those born within the realm on or after the effective date, to be British subjects. By using the word person, the statute nullified legitimacy requirements for jus soli nationals which had existed in previous nationality laws. For those born abroad on or after the effective date, legitimacy was still required, and could only be derived by a child from a British father (one generation), who was natural-born or naturalised. Naturalisations required five years residence or service to the crown.

In 1916, the Gilbert and Ellice Islands Colony became a crown colony which included Fanning, Ocean, Union, and Washington Islands. Amendments to the British Nationality Act were enacted in 1918, 1922, 1933 and 1943 changing derivative nationality by descent and modifying slightly provisions for women to lose their nationality upon marriage. In 1919, Christmas Island was annexed to the Colony and in 1925 Union Island was transferred to the administration of New Zealand. Because of a rise in statelessness, a woman who did not automatically acquire her husband's nationality upon marriage or upon his naturalisation in another country, did not lose their British status after 1933. In 1937, because of a need for additional land to accommodate a growing population, the Phoenix Islands were incorporated into the Gilbert and Ellice Islands Colony. A disputed claim to the Canton and Enderbury Islands of the Phoenix group led to an agreement in 1939 between Britain and the United States for joint administration of those two islands as a protected state. The 1943 revision to British nationality law allowed a child born abroad at any time to be a British national by descent if the Secretary of State agreed to register the birth.

Under the terms of the British Nationality Act 1948 British nationals in Gilbert and Ellice Islands Colony were reclassified at that time as "Citizens of the UK and Colonies" (CUKC). The basic British nationality scheme did not change overmuch, and typically those who were previously defined as British remained the same. Changes included that wives and children no longer automatically acquired the status of the husband or father, children who acquired nationality by descent no longer were required to make a retention declaration, and registrations for children born abroad were extended. In 1971, the remaining central and southern Line Islands were joined to the Gilbert and Ellice Islands Colony. As of 31 December 1974 the Protectorate for Canton Island ceased and persons living there became stateless. On 1 October 1975 the Ellice Islands were detached from the Colony, renamed as the Colony of Tuvalu, and the remainder of the islands were renamed as the Gilbert Islands Colony, which continued to exist until 1979.

=== Post-Independence (1979–present) ===
On 12 July 1979, the former colony changed its name to the Republic of Kiribati and gained independence from Britain. Generally, persons, who were of Kiribati descent or stateless and had previously been nationals as defined under the classification of "Citizens of the UK and Colonies", would become nationals of Kiribati on Independence Day and cease to be British nationals. The constitution conferred nationality for persons who had been registered or naturalised in the former colony and upon married women whose husbands became nationals of Kiribati, or would have become except for death, on 12 July 1979. Exceptions were made for persons to retain their British nationality and status if they (or their father or grandfather) were born, naturalised, or registered in a part of the realm which remained at the independence of Kiribati part of the United Kingdom or colonies, or had been annexed by such a place. Women who were married to persons who retained their CUKC status remained CUKCs unless their husband lost his status. Subsequently, the House of Assembly passed Law 1 of 1979 to define citizenship and nationality in the nation and that year signed the Treaty of Friendship and Territorial Sovereignty, United States-Tuvalu to end territorial disputes with the United States over Canton, Enderbury, and the Line Island groups and recognise Kiribati's sovereignty over them. Kiribati's Citizenship Act was amended in 1981, and again in 1998, but gender disparity still evident in the law in 2020 which prevents legitimate children born abroad from acquiring their mother's nationality; married women from obtaining naturalization except through their spouse, or from conferring their nationality upon their husbands; and children from deriving nationality from a mother in the case of a joint adoption. At the United Nations Human Rights Council 2020 Universal Periodic Review, Kiribati agreed to evaluate women's ability to transfer their nationality to their family members.
