= Robert Corrie =

- Born: Robert David Corrie; February 6, 1842; West Derby, Lancashire, England
- Disappeared: May 23, 1915 (aged 73); Gilbert and Ellice Islands
- Occupation: Trader

Robert David Corrie (6 February 1842 – c. 23 May 1915) was a trader in the Gilbert Islands. Corrie spent most of his seven-decade career on Maiana. He learned the Gilbertese language and bartered with the Gilbertese people for bêche-de-mer, coconut oil and shark fins, which he then sold to trading ships. Corrie mentored George McGhee Murdoch and was a one-time agent for Richard Randell. He gained a reputation as a conscientious trader who remained impartial in indigenous politics and ran his own schools in Maiana. After the Gilbert and Ellice Islands became a British protectorate in 1892, Corrie served in a variety of roles, including language interpretation.

== Life ==
Robert David Corrie was born on 6 February 1842 in West Derby, Lancashire, England. His family later moved to Sydney. After his father died, Corrie, who was in his twenties, signed on to a whaler heading to the Central Pacific. He jumped ship on Tabiteuea and became a trader in the Gilbert Islands, selling bêche-de-mer, coconut oil and shark fins, for which he bartered with the locals.

.. quiet, spectacled Bob Corrie, of wild Maiana, who can twist them [the natives] round his little finger without an angry word.

— Louis Becke

Corrie expanded his business to Butaritari and Marakei before permanently settling on Maiana in 1861. Corrie briefly worked as an agent for Richard Randell, who led the coconut oil trade in the Gilbert Islands, until around 1875, and in his heyday earned over £1,000. He was regarded as a responsible trader who remained impartial during indigenous wars. In 1880 or 1881, Corrie turned down Tem Binoka when he offered to make Corrie the governor of Maiana if Corrie helped him conquer the island. Before Christian missionaries arrived, Corrie ran schools on Maiana out of his own pocket. He also mentored and taught George McGhie Murdoch, a young, uneducated Scotsman who was marooned on the Gilbert Islands in 1881. Murdoch worked for Corrie as a bookkeeper and storekeeper on Maiana before striking it out on his own, eventually becoming a successful trader and later a colonial officer.

Corrie was one of two white people on Maiana until trade picked up in the 1880s and 1890s. His first marriage was to Taoniti, a woman from Maiana with whom he had six children: Charles, Fanny, Alec, Mary, Ben and Agnes. After Taoniti died, Corrie married Lidia, a woman from Tarawa, and had six more children with her: May, Sarah, Mita, Charlotte, Ruth and James. Corrie first met John Bates Thurston, the High Commissioner of the Western Pacific, as a crew member of the shipwrecked Margaret Thompson on Rotuma in 1965. In 1892, Thurston recommended Corrie as an interpreter for Captain E. H. M. Davis of HMS Dart. Davis, with Corrie, sailed across the Gilbert and Ellice Islands to declare the establishment of a British protectorate. Corrie was a signatory of the Declaration of Protection of the Gilbert Islands on 26 May 1892. He performed a variety of duties under the protectorate, including service as an island magistrate and as Resident Commissioner William Telfer Campbell's part-time interpreter.

On May 23, 1915, Corrie, his wife, two of his children, and several other Gilbertese people departed Maiana in a trading cutter. The ship disappeared at sea. His Euronesian daughter, Agnes, remained on Maiana and according to Pacific Islands Monthly was a well-known personality in the Gilberts.
