= Jack Barley =

English cricketer and colonial administrator

Personal information
- Full name: Jack Charles Barley
- Born: 4 December 1887; Eton, Buckinghamshire, England
- Died: 26 October 1956 (aged 68); Surfers Paradise, Queensland, Australia
- Batting: Right-handed
- Role: Wicket-keeper

Domestic team information
- Years: Team
- 1909: Oxford University
- 1909: Worcestershire
- 1908: Sussex

Career statistics
Competition	First-class
Matches	4
Runs scored	12
Batting average	2.40
100s/50s	–/–
Top score	8
Balls bowled	–
Wickets	–
Bowling average	–
5 wickets in innings	–
10 wickets in match	–
Best bowling	–
Catches/stumpings	4/1
- Source: Cricinfo, 15 January 2012

Jack Charles Barley (4 December 1887 – 26 October 1956) was an English cricketer and a British Colonial Service administrator. A right-handed batsman and wicket-keeper, he played four first-class matches, all for different teams. He scored 12 runs in eight innings and made five dismissals: one stumping and four catches.

== Cricket career ==
His debut came for Sussex against Cambridge University in 1908; he had a quiet match, taking only one catch and scoring 0 and 1 with the bat. The following year he played for HDG Leveson-Gower's XI against Oxford University, for Worcestershire against the same opposition, and finally for Oxford University against Surrey.

Barley has one minor claim to fame: he shared in Worcestershire's record eleventh-wicket partnership – albeit one of just 9 – with Maurice Jewell in their 12-a-side match against Oxford University.

== Colonial administrator ==
Barley joined the administration of the Western Pacific High Commission after leaving Oxford University in 1911. Barley was appointed to work in the civil service in the Solomon Islands, as District Officer at Tulagi, before succeeding Arthur Grimble as the British Resident Commissioner in the Gilbert and Ellice Islands from 18 October 1933. Barley's tenure ended officially in December 1941 following the Japanese occupation of the Gilbert Islands, however Ronald Garvey had replaced him as Acting Resident Commissioner from 1938 to 1939. Then Cyril George Fox Cartwright was acting Resident Commissioner until Vivian Fox-Strangways took up his appointment as Resident Commissioner.

Barley died at Surfers Paradise, Queensland, Australia on 26 October 1956.
