= Kiribati New Zealanders =

Total population
- Kiribati; 4,659 (2023 Census)

Regions with significant populations
- Auckland · Canterbury · Otago and Southland · Waikato · Wellington

Languages
- New Zealand English · Gilbertese

Religion
- Majority Christian

Kiribati New Zealanders refers to New Zealand citizens or permanent residents or others with rights to reside pending move to permanent residency (e.g., by virtue of the Pacific Access Category of immigration (PAC)) who are fully or partially of I-Kiribati descent. According to the 2023 census, 4,659 New Zealanders declared their ethnicity as Kiribati. At present, there may be up to another 1,000 I-Kiribati in New Zealand on guestworker schemes such as the Recognised Seasonal Employment Scheme (RSE). This number has been down since the COVID-19 disruption but is recovering slowly. The Kiribati end of this circular migration was also affected by this disruption.

== Demographics ==
I-Kiribati people are classified as a subset of Pasifika New Zealanders under the Ethnicity New Zealand Standard Classification by Stats NZ Tatauranga Aotearoa. According to the 2006 Census, there were 1,116 Kiribati New Zealanders in New Zealand; this has since quadrupled, including through further immigration and through procreation.

As of 2023, 58.4% of Kiribati New Zealanders were born in Kiribati itself or elsewhere, and so only 41.6% of Kiribati New Zealanders were born in New Zealand. The born elsewhere include people from Australia, Solomon Islands, Fiji, United States and United Kingdom.

41.8% of New Zealand residents who declared their ethnicity as I-Kiribati live in the Auckland Region. The Kiribati community is especially prominent in the country town of Warkworth, where Gilbertese is the second most spoken language. Smaller I-Kiribati communities exist on the Te Ika-a-Māui in the Waikato region, Hawke Bay and in Wellington, while communities on the Te Waipounamu. in Marllborough, Canterbury, Otago and Southland are even smaller, but all are growing faster than Auckland.

== Organisations ==
New Zealand's Kiribati associations include the nationwide New Zealand Kiribati National Council, the Warkworth-based Kiribati Aotearoa Diaspora Directorate and the Otago Kiribati Islands Students' Association in Dunedin. The diasporic communities spread up and down the South Island's east coast cooperate under the Kiribati Waipounamu Committee.

Clendon Park in South Auckland is home to the Kiribati Uniting Church NZ.

Kiribati Language Week is a yearly event organised by the Ministry for Pacific Peoples.

== Connections between Kiribati and New Zealand ==
Connections between Kiribati and New Zealand may go back centuries, if not a millennia or so. It is entirely possible that corresponding to Māori voyaging en masse from Hawaiiki, I-Kiribati voyaged away from Samoa to settle in the Gilberts.

The whalers who plundered the On-the-Line grounds from the 1820s for a few decades included I-Kiribati and Māori crew and also hunted waters around New Zealand and used whaling stations there.

Henderson and Macfarlane of Auckland was among the major trading companies that operated on Butaritari. The company collected copra from its trading stations in the Gilberts and it was processed to produce coconut oil. By 1897, it had merged with J. T. Arundel

The schooner Coronet belonging to Binoka of Abemama travels to New Zealand in the 1880s.

The New Zealander Albert Ellis is widely accredited with realising that Banaba (and Nauru) comprised significant deposits of phosphate, while working for John T. Arundel in Sydney in 1900. Ellis is involved in their mining and distribution as a company employee and later as a commissioner of the British Phosphate Commission. Much of the rock mined on Banaba (1901-1979) ends up fertilising New Zealand's two main islands under the Nauru Island Agreement.

Coastwatchers from New Zealand stationed in the Gilberts are captured and imprisoned by the Japanese occupation forces and subsequently executed.

The first secondary school for girls in the Gilberts is named after Elaine Bernacchi, who was of New Zealand descent and partner of the resident commissioner Michael Bernacchi. They subsequently retired to New Zealand.

The New Zealander Val Andersen succeeds Michael Bernacchi as resident commissioner.

Since at least the 1960s, a small but steady stream of I-Kiribati went to New Zealand on scholarships to complete secondary and tertiary (bachelor, master and doctor degrees) studies, mostly returning to Kiribati to take up public service positions, sometimes going onto take up political positions in government or opposition. These include former Beretitenti, Ieremia Tabai and Anote Tong, and former Kauoman ni Beretitenti, Teima Onorio.

New Zealand Government establishes High Commission on Tarawa in 1988.

Under new work permit scheme with Kiribati, a small contingent of I-Kiribati work in Auckland for an aluminium supply company. Further contingents come to Waikato to pick asparagus and Marlborough to prune grape vines, and temporary labour circulating between Kiribati and New Zealand grows from there.

From the 1980s, an I-Kiribati–Tuvaluan diasporic community begins to form covering Te Ika-a-Māui, comprising I-Kiribati-I-Matang couples, their children, students, guest workers and others with links to Kiribati. Today, there are numerous I-Kiribati diasporic communities all across New Zealand, including Auckland, Hamilton, Wellington, Canterbury and Southland.
