= John Osbaldiston Field =

British Colonial Service administrator (1913–1985)

Sir John Osbaldiston Field
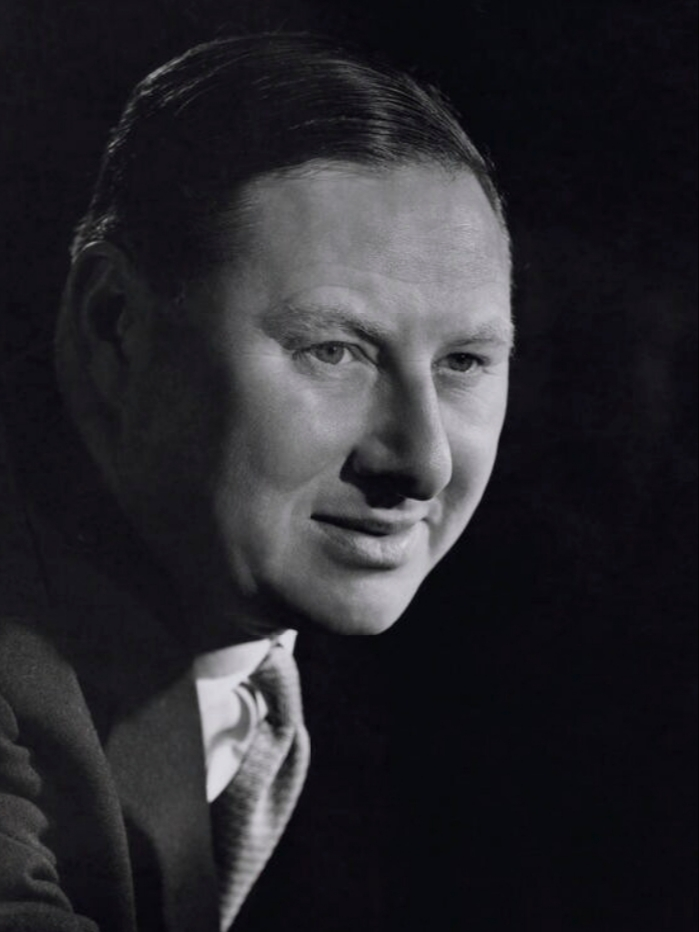
- John Osbaldiston Field in 1962

Resident Commissioner of the Gilbert and Ellice Islands (1970–1972) Governor of the Gilbert and Ellice Islands (1972–1973)
- In office 9 January 1970 – April 1973
- Preceded by: Val Andersen
- Succeeded by: John Hilary Smith

Governor of Saint Helena
- In office 1963–1969
- Preceded by: Sir Robert Alford
- Succeeded by: Sir Dermod Murphy

Commissioner of the British Cameroons
- In office 1956 – 1 October 1961
- Preceded by: Edward John Gibbons
- Succeeded by: territory dissolved

Personal details
- Born: 30 October 1913 Southsea, Hampshire, England
- Died: 22 February 1985 (aged 71)
- Occupation: Colonial Service

Sir John Osbaldiston Field KBE CMG (30 October 1913 – 22 February 1985) was a British colonial administrator who was the last Resident Commissioner of the Gilbert and Ellice Islands from 9 January 1970 and then, from 1 January 1972, the first Governor of this Crown Colony.

Field was one of three children of Frank Osbaldiston Field of Gosport, Hampshire and Gertrude Caroline Perrin of Natal, South Africa. He was educated at Stellenbosch Boys School in South Africa and Magdalene College, Cambridge.

From 1963 to 1969, he also was the British Governor of Saint Helena. He was before the Commissioner of the British Cameroons (United Nations trust territory) before incorporation.

Field died on 22 February 1985, at the age of 71.
