= Governor Wallace =

Governor Wallace may refer to:

- David Wallace (Indiana politician) (1799–1859), 6th Governor of Indiana
- George Wallace (1919–1998), 45th Governor of Alabama
- James Wallace (Royal Navy officer) (1731–1803), Commodore Governor of Newfoundland from 1794 to 1796
- Jesse Wallace (1899–1961), 29th Governor of American Samoa
- Lew Wallace (1827–1905), 11th Governor of New Mexico Territory
- Lurleen Wallace (1926–1968), 46th Governor of Alabama
- Reginald James Wallace (1919–2012), Governor of the Gilbert Islands from 1978 to 1979
- William H. Wallace (1811–1879), 4th Governor of Washington Territory
