= Cyril Cartwright =

Cyril Cartwright may refer to:

- Cyril Cartwright (cyclist) (1924–2015), British cyclist
- Cyril Cartwright (civil servant) (1920–1943), British colonial service administrator
