= Arthur William Mahaffy =

British Colonial Service administrator

District Officer, Gilbert and Ellice Islands Protectorate; Deputy Commissioner, British Solomon Islands Protectorate; Colonial Secretary of Colony of Fiji, and then Assistant High Commissioner; Resident Commissioner, New Hebrides; Administrator, Dominica

Personal details
- Born: 22 October 1869 Howth, co. Dublin, Ireland
- Died: 28 October 1919 (aged 50) Dominica
- Spouse: Edith Enid Boyd (1874 – 1960)
- Children: Sibell Frances Kathleen Lucy Mahaffy (1904 – 1965); John Mahaffy (1906 – 1934)
- Education: Trinity College, Dublin
- Occupation: Colonial Service

Arthur William Mahaffy O.B.E. was a colonial administrator who served in the Gilbert and Ellice Islands Protectorate, the British Solomon Islands Protectorate, the Colony of Fiji, the Anglo-French Condominium of the New Hebrides, with his final post being the Administrator of Dominica.

== Biography ==
Mahaffy was the son of Lady Frances Letitia and Sir John Pentland Mahaffy. John Mahaffy was a Classics scholar and was a provost of Trinity College in Dublin. He was said to have taught the young Oscar Wilde.

Mahaffy attended Marlborough College, and Magdalene College at Oxford University, however he moved to Trinity College, Dublin where he received a Bachelor of Arts (1891) and a Master of Arts (1904). Following his graduation with a B.A., he accepted a junior position at Magdalene College, then he joined the Royal Munster Fusiliers as a 2nd Lieutenant. He was accepted into the Colonial Service in October 1895, joining the Western Pacific High Commission where his first position was as a District Officer in the Gilbert and Ellice Islands Protectorate.

== Solomon Islands – suppressing headhunting ==
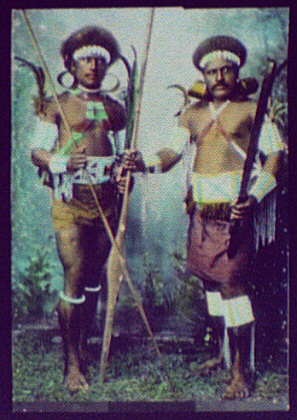
Two warriors in battle dress (1895)

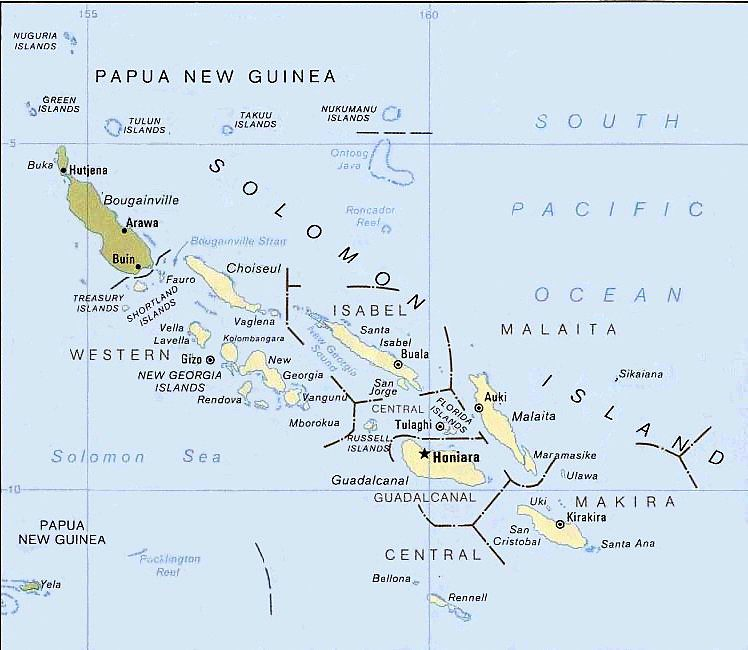
A map of the Solomon Islands, with New Georgia located in the centre-left.

The Colonial Office had appointed Charles Morris Woodford as the Resident Commissioner in the Solomon Islands on 17 February 1897. He was directed to control the coercive labour recruitment practices, known as blackbirding, operating in the Solomon Island waters and to stop the illegal trade in firearms. Mahaffy was appointed as the Deputy Commissioner to Woodford in January 1898. In January 1900, Mahaffy established a government station at Gizo, as Woodford considered Mahaffy’s military training as making him suitable for the role of suppressing headhunting in New Georgia and neighbouring islands. Mahaffy had a force of twenty-five police officers armed with rifles, who were recruited from the islands of Malaita, Savo and Isabel. The first target of this force was chief Ingava of the Roviana Lagoon of New Georgia who had been raiding Choiseul and Isabel and killing or enslaving hundreds of people.

Mahaffy and the police officers under his command carried out a violent and ruthless suppression of headhunting, with his actions having the support of Woodford and the Western Pacific High Commission, who wanted to eradicate headhunting and complete a “pacification” of the western Solomon Islands through punitive expeditions. Mahaffy seized and also destroyed large war canoes (tomokos). One war canoe was used to transport the police officers. The western Solomon Islands were substantially pacified by 1902. During this time Mahaffy acquired artefacts held in high value by the Solomon Islanders for his personal collection.

Mahaffy was appointed as a resident magistrate. He visited Malaita on HMS Sparrow (1889) in 1902 to investigate several deaths. Mahaffy demanded the Malaitians give up the person believed to be the murderer, and when they did not, Sparrow shelled the village and a shore party burnt down the village and killed the pigs. Malaita was a difficult island to administer as Mahaffy believed that 80 per cent of Malaitan males possessed firearms in the 1900s. There were frequent inter-tribal killings and pay-back killings. Indiscriminate naval bombardments or naval shore parties destroying villages, canoes and killing pigs to punish Solomon Islanders was a common response to incidents, where the colonial administrators could not arrest the perpetrators of killings.

== Appointment to Fiji – Mahaffy report into the administration of William Telfer Campbell ==
Mahaffy remained in the Solomon Islands for over six years until September 1904 when he transferred to Fiji, where he was appointed as the Colonial Secretary of Fiji, under the Governor of Fiji, Sir Everard im Thurn.

At this time, the Governor of Fiji simultaneously acted as High Commissioner for the Western Pacific. From 1892, the Gilbert and Ellice Islands were directly administered by a Resident Commissioner. In 1895, William Telfer Campbell was appointed as the Resident Commissioner, remaining in office until 1908. Telfer Campbell was criticised for his legislative, judicial and administrative management. It was alleged that he extracted forced labour from the islanders. In 1909, Mahaffy returned to the Gilbert and Ellice Islands Protectorates for three months as Assistant High Commissioner, to carry out an inquiry into this allegation. and he issued his findings, which were published in 1910.

In 1913, an anonymous correspondent to The New Age journal, probably John Quayle-Dickson, published an article under the title "Modern buccaneers in the West Pacific", and described the maladministration of Telfer Campbell, and challenged Mahaffy’s impartiality, because he was a former colonial official in the Gilbert and Ellice Islands Protectorate. The anonymous correspondent also criticised the operation of the Pacific Phosphate Company, which was the company mining the phosphate deposits on Nauru and Banaba (Ocean Island).

== Later career ==
Mahaffy was the Resident Commissioner in the Anglo-French Condominium of the New Hebrides from 1912 to 1913. He returned to London in 1914. He was appointed as the Administrator of Dominica from 1914 until his death in October 1919.

He was appointed as an Officer of the Order of the British Empire (OBE) in the 1919 Birthday Honours.

His family donated his Solomon Islands ethnographic collection and papers to the National Museum of Ireland.
