= Michael Bernacchi =

British colonial administrator (1911–1983)

Resident Commissioner of the Gilbert and Ellice Islands
- In office 5 August 1952 – October 1961
- Preceded by: John Peel
- Succeeded by: Val Andersen

Personal details
- Born: 5 May 1911
- Died: 20 August 1983 (aged 72)
- Occupation: Colonial Service

Michael Louis Bernacchi CMG OBE (5 May 1911 – 20 August 1983) was a British colonial administrator, who was the Resident Commissioner of the Gilbert and Ellice Islands from 1952 to 1961.

Bernacchi also served as a Lieutenant Commander in the Royal Navy, and as a district officer in the Colonial Office in British Malaya during the Malayan Emergency.

He was the eldest son of Louis Bernacchi, an Australian physicist and astronomer best known for his role in several Antarctic expeditions. He married Elaine Chapman from Navua, Fiji. Chapman was the granddaughter of Sir John Maynard Hedstrom, founder of Morris Hedstrom and Company, the largest trading corporation in Fiji.

Between 1966 and 1983 he lived in Christchurch, New Zealand. He donated many of his father's Antarctic collection to the Canterbury Museum, that related to the Carstens Borchgrevink's Southern Cross expedition (1898–1900) and the Discovery expedition led by Robert Falcon Scott (1901–1904).

Bernacchi died on 20 August 1983, at the age of 72.
