= Vivian Fox-Strangways =

British officer (1898–1974)

Resident Commissioner of the Gilbert and Ellice Islands
- In office 1941–1946
- Preceded by: Jack Barley
- Succeeded by: Henry Evans Maude

Personal details
- Born: 29 July 1898
- Died: 21 November 1974 (aged 76)
- Occupation: British Officer then Colonial Service

Vivian Fox-Strangways CBE (29 July 1898 – 21 November 1974) was a British officer (Colonel, British Army), Resident Commissioner of the partly occupied by Japan Gilbert and Ellice Islands, from 1941 to 1946.

Because of the Pacific War, Fox-Strangways was seconded into the army with the rank of major and was located on Tulagi in the British Solomon Islands. From December 1941 to August 1942, being on Ocean Island at the administrative centre of the colony, Cyril George Fox Cartwright was acting Resident for Fox-Strangways. Therefore, the effective resident mandate of Fox-Strangways was from August 1942 to November 1945 — when his office and headquarters was in Funafuti (Ellice Islands), until on 22 November 1943, he could land on Betio islet, at the end of Battle of Tarawa, where he began to establish the administrative centre of the colony on Tarawa, first on Betio islet and subsequently on Bairiki islet. The provisional headquarters of the colony stayed in Funafuti until 1946 and the rebuilding of Tarawa.

Carl Henry Jones (1893–1958) was the U.S. commander Gilbert Islands Subarea (from 18 December 1943 to 1 October 1944). In November 1946, Fox-Strangways was replaced by Henry Evans Maude as Resident Commissioner. Fox-Strangways was transferred to Palestine.

Vivian Fox-Strangways was the brother of Walter Angelo Fox-Strangways, 8th Earl of Ilchester. He was educated at Winchester College in Winchester. He fought during World War I. He was with Queen Victoria's Corps or Guides and Overseas Civil Service. He was awarded the U.S. Legion of Merit in 1944. He was appointed Commander, Order of the British Empire (CBE) in 1953.
