= Val Andersen =

British Colonial Service administrator (1919–2004)

Resident Commissioner of the Gilbert and Ellice Islands
- In office Oct 1961 (Roy Davies, Acting); Apr 1962 – Jun 1969
- Preceded by: Michael Bernacchi
- Succeeded by: John Osbaldiston Field

Personal details
- Born: 21 March 1919 Palmerston North, New Zealand
- Died: 14 November 2004 (aged 85)
- Education: University of Auckland
- Occupation: Colonial Service then FCO

Valdemar A. Jens Andersen CMG OBE (21 March 1919 – 14 November 2004) was a British Colonial Service administrator from New Zealand.

== Biography ==
Andersen was educated at Napier Boys' High School and Auckland University College. He was then appointed as a cadet in the British Solomon Islands Protectorate. He served as Lieutenant in command with the Royal Navy during World War II (1940–1946). In 1947, he joined the Colonial Service for the Gilbert and Ellice Islands as an Administrative Officer Cadet, where he remained until been appointed in 1962 as Resident Commissioner.
