= Charles Richard Swayne =

British Colonial Service administrator

Resident Commissioner of the Gilbert and Ellice Islands
- In office 1892 (Ellice Islands only), Oct 1893 – Nov 1895
- Preceded by: Created
- Succeeded by: William Telfer Campbell

Personal details
- Born: 1843 Dublin
- Died: 1921 (aged 77–78)
- Occupation: Colonial Service

Charles Richard Swayne CMG (1843–1921), born in Dublin, was the first Resident Commissioner of the Gilbert and Ellice Islands protectorate, from 1892 to 1895.

Swayne had spent more than 20 years as a Magistrate at Lomaloma and then in Lau in Fiji, before being seconded to the new two protectorates, where he spent the few years after.

Sir John Bates Thurston, as High Commissioner for the Western Pacific, appointed his friend Swayne in 1892, as the first Resident Commissioner in those territories, initially only for the separate protectorate of the Ellice Islands, before extending one year later his mandate to the Gilbert Islands.

In 1892, Swayne first arrived in the Ellice Islands, then, from October 1893 to November 1895, he was in the Gilbert Islands with central headquarters set in Tarawa, with a Residency erected in Betio in 1895. Swayne spent his Resident years in a peripatetic way, moving from island to island, by whatever commercial or naval vessels, returning to Suva or Sydney when necessary.

He faced a severe drought in the southern Gilberts, rendering impossible to collect the new capitation in those southernmost islands. He also faced the claims from traders, especially in Butaritari, all that reinforced suspicions of the Colonial Office that the protectorate had been an error.
