= Gilbert Islands =

Group of islands in Kiribati

Native name: Tungaru
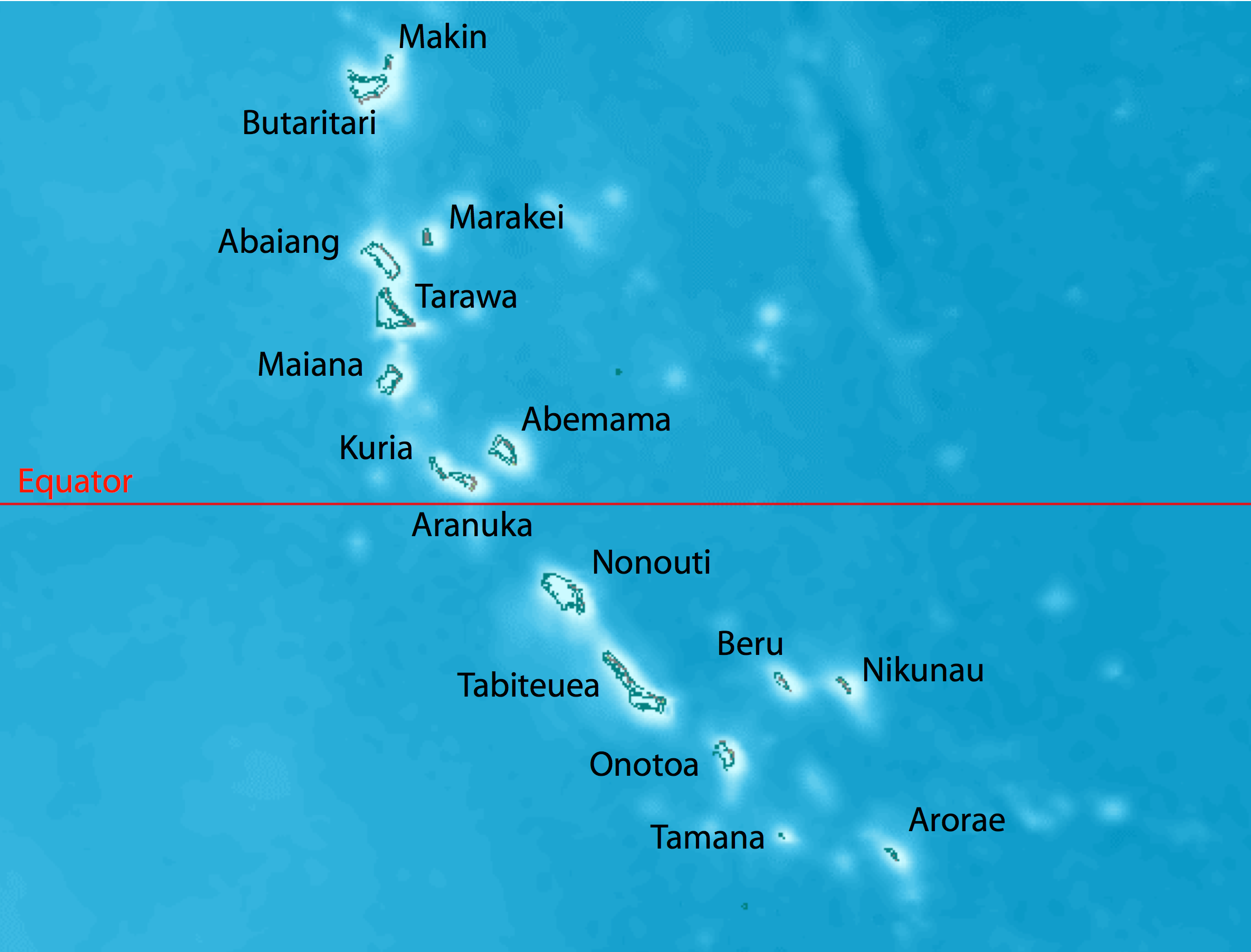

Geography
- Location: Pacific Ocean
- Coordinates: 0°N 174°E
- Total islands: 16
- Major islands: Makin, Butaritari, Marakei, Abaiang, Tarawa, Maiana, Abemama, Kuria, Aranuka, Nonouti, Tabiteuea, Beru, Nikunau, Onotoa, Tamana, Arorae
- Area: 108 sq mi (280 km^{2})
- Highest elevation: 18 ft (5.5 m)
- Highest point: Banaba

Administration
- Kiribati
- Capital and largest city: South Tarawa (pop. 63,439)

Demographics
- Population: 83,382 (2005)

The Gilbert Islands (Gilbertese: Tungaru; formerly Kingsmill or King's-Mill Islands) are a chain of sixteen atolls and coral islands in the Pacific Ocean, about halfway between Papua New Guinea and Hawaii. They constitute the main part of the country of Kiribati (the name of which is a rendering of "Gilberts" in the phonology of the indigenous Gilbertese). The Gilbert Islands comprise the eastern-most part of Micronesia.

== Geography ==
The atolls and islands of the Gilbert Islands lie in an approximate north-to-south line. The northernmost island in the group, Makin, it is approximately 420 nautical miles (780 km) from southernmost, Arorae, as the crow flies. Geographically, the equator is the dividing line between the northern and southern Gilbert Islands. However, the International Hydrographic Organization (IHO) considers the entire Gilbert islands group to be in the South Pacific Ocean.

Another way to group the Gilbert Islands is according to their former administrative districts, which were known as the Northern, Central, and Southern Gilberts. (Tarawa was once a separate district as well).

At one time, a subset of the northern Gilbert islands was known as Scarborough Islands and a subset of the southern Gilberts as the Kingsmill Group; in some 19th century texts, this last name of Kingsmills was applied to the entire Gilberts group.

Geologically, the Gilberts and the Ratak chain of the Marshall Islands to their north together form a continuous chain of seamounts.

=== Islands of the Gilberts ===
In official north–south order (grouped by former administrative district), the islands and atolls are:

Gilbert Islands
Atoll / Island	Main village	Land area		Lagoon area		Pop. c. 2005	Min. number of islets	Villages	Location
Atoll / Island	Main village	km^{2}	sq mi	km^{2}	sq mi	Pop. c. 2005	Min. number of islets	Villages	Location
Former district of the Northern Gilberts
Makin	Makin	7.89	3.0	0.3	0.1	2,385	6	2	3°23′N 173°00′E
Butaritari	Temanokunuea	13.49	5.2	191.7	74.0	3,280	11	11	3°09′N 172°50′E
Marakei	Rawannawi	14.13	5.5	19.6	7.6	2,741	1	8	2°00′N 173°17′E
Abaiang	Tuarabu	17.48	6.7	232.5	89.8	5,502	4-20	18	1°50′N 172°57′E
Tarawa	Betio	31.02	12.0	343.6	132.7	45,989	9+	30	1°26′N 173°00′E
Former district of the Central Gilberts
Maiana	Tebwangetua	16.72	6.5	98.4	38.0	1,908	9	12	0°55′N 173°00′E
Abemama	Kariatebike	27.37	10.6	132.4	51.1	3,404	8	12	0°24′N 173°50′E
Kuria	Tabontebike	15.48	6.0	—	—	1,082	2	6	0°13′N 173°24′E
Aranuka	Takaeang	11.61	4.5	19.4	7.5	1,158	4	3	0°09′N 173°35′E
Nonouti^{1)}	Teuabu	19.85	7.7	370.4	143.0	3,179	12	9	0°40′S 174°20′E
Former district of the Southern Gilberts
Tabiteuea^{1)}	Buariki	37.63	14.5	365.2	141.0	4,898	2+	18	1°20′S 174°50′E
Beru^{1)}	Taubukinberu	17.65	6.8	38.9	15.0	2,169	1	9	1°20′S 175°59′E
Nikunau^{1)}	Rungata	19.08	7.4	—	—	1,912	1	6	1°21′S 176°28′E
Onotoa^{1)}	Buariki	15.62	6.0	54.4	21.0	1,644	30	7	1°52′S 175°33′E
Tamana	Bakaka	4.73	1.8	—	—	875	1	3	2°30′S 175°58′E
Arorae	Roreti	9.48	3.7	—	—	1,256	1	2	2°38′S 176°49′E
Gilbert Islands	South Tarawa	281.10	108.5	1,866.5	720.7	83,382	117+	156	3°23'N to 2°38S; 172°50' to 176°49'E
^{1)} part of Kingsmill Group proper Source for land areas: Kiribati 2005 Census Report

=== Northern Gilberts ===
The Northern Gilberts (meang or mweang) geographically and traditionally encompass Butaritari, Makin, Marakei, Abaiang (literally northland) and Tarawa. They have unique tonal accents with differences particularly noted amongst Butaritari and Makin inhabitants. Traditionally, Butaritari and Makin were ruled by a chief who lived on Butaritari (called Makin or Great Makin). This chief had all the powers and authority to make and impose decisions on the Islanders, a system very different from the Southern Gilbert Islands where power was wielded collectively by the unimwane or old men of the island.

The northern Gilberts have a greater mean rainfall in comparison to the southern and central Gilberts allowing cultivation of a wider crop range. Butaritari and Makin supply most of the bananas sold in Kiribati. The cultivation of taro or babai (Cyrtosperma merkusii) has been historically easier in the northern Gilberts due to a higher water table and regular rainfall.

=== Central Gilberts ===
The Central Gilberts or nuka have traditionally included Maiana, Abemama, Kuria and Aranuka. However, the latter three are considered the main islands that have unique historical and cultural characteristics which distinguish the Central Gilberts from the north and south.

Tembinok', the last king of Abemama, Kuria and Aranuka, died in the early part of the 20th century.

=== Southern Gilberts ===
The Southern Gilberts include the atolls of Nonouti, South and North Tabiteuea, Beru, Nikunau, Onotoa, Tamana and the most southerly island of Arorae.

== History ==
=== Prehistory ===
The islands had been inhabited by Oceanians for several millennia (at least 2,000 years, probably 3,000).

=== Contact with Europeans ===
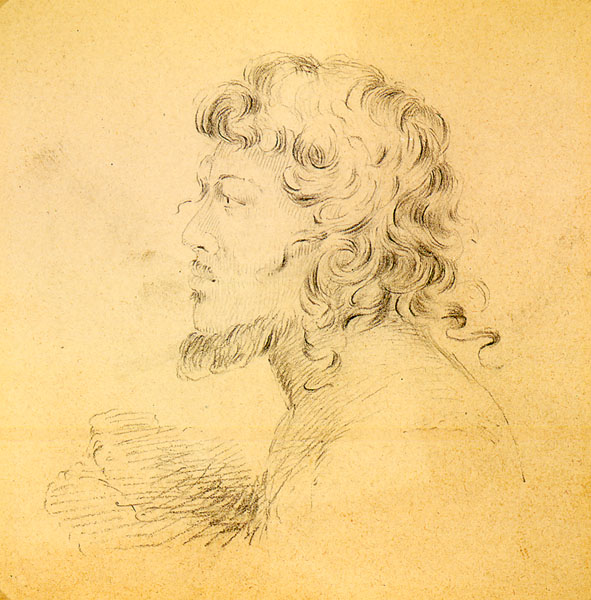
Portrait of a native of the Makin islands, drawn by Alfred Thomas Agate (1841)

In 1606, Portuguese navigator Pedro Fernandes de Queirós sighted Butaritari and Makin, which he named the Buen Viaje Islands.

The British explorer Vice-Admiral John Byron passed through the islands in 1765 during his circumnavigation of the globe as captain of HMS Dolphin. He weighed anchor off Nikunau.

In 1788 Captain Thomas Gilbert on Charlotte and Captain John Marshall on Scarborough crossed through Kuria, Aranuka, Tarawa, Abaiang, Butaritari, and Makin without attempting to land on the atolls.

In 1820, the islands were named the Gilbert Islands or îles Gilbert (in French) by Adam Johann von Krusenstern, a Baltic German Admiral of the Russian Czar after the British Captain Thomas Gilbert, who crossed the archipelago in 1788. French captain Louis Duperrey was the first to map the whole Gilbert Islands archipelago. He commanded La Coquille on its circumnavigation of the earth (1822–1825).

=== US exploration ===
Many whaling ships called at the islands in the 19th century. The first recorded visit was by the Ann and Hope, which called at Nikunau in December 1799. The main period of whaling occurred from 1825 until the 1860s, when whales were taken in large numbers On-the-Line (i.e., the equator).

Two ships of the United States Exploring Expedition (1838–1842), USS Peacock and Flying Fish, under the command of Captain William L. Hudson, visited many of the Gilbert Islands (then called the Kingsmill Islands or Kingsmill Group in English). While in the Gilberts, they devoted considerable time to mapping and charting reefs and anchorages.

=== Colonial rule ===
Colony of Gilbert Islands
- 1976–1979
- Flag Coat of arms
- Anthem: "God Save the Queen"
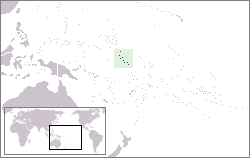
- Status: Colony of the United Kingdom
- Capital: South Tarawa
- Common languages: English, Gilbertese
- Monarch
  - 1976–1979: Elizabeth II
- Governor
  - 1976–1978: John Hilary Smith
  - 1978–1979: Reginald James Wallace
- Chief Minister
  - 1976–1978: Naboua Ratieta
  - 1978–1979: Ieremia Tabai
- History
  - Colony: 1 January 1976
  - Disestablished: 12 July 1979

Population
  - 1978: 56,213
- Currency: Australian dollar
Preceded by	Succeeded by
Gilbert and Ellice Islands	Kiribati
- Today part of: Kiribati

In 1886, an Anglo-German agreement partitioned the "unclaimed" central Pacific, leaving Nauru in the German sphere of influence, while Banaba (Ocean Island) and the future GEIC wound up in the British sphere of influence. A British protectorate was first proclaimed over the Gilberts by Captain Edward Davis of HMS Royalist on 27 May 1892. British official Arthur Mahaffy visited the Islands in 1909. He noted that the "villages are kept in admirable order and the roads are scrupulously clean." A hospital was on each island, as well. The conduct of William Telfer Campbell, the second resident commissioner of the Gilberts, was criticised as to his legislative, judicial and administrative management (including allegations of forced labour exacted from islanders) and became the subject of the 1909 report by Arthur Mahaffy. In 1913 an anonymous correspondent to The New Age journal described the mis-administration of Telfer Campbell and challenged the impartiality of Arthur Mahaffy as he was a former colonial official in the Gilberts.

In 1915, starting from 1916, the Gilbert and Ellice Islands were proclaimed a colony of the British Empire.

==== Population ====
The natives of the Gilbert Islands are Austronesian peoples, similar in many respects to the natives of the Marshalls or the Carolines.

In Mahaffy's 1909 report to the British Government he described the missionaries or Protectorate staff then resident in the Gilbert Islands.

At the outbreak of World War II, about 78% of the native population were said to be Christians. This group was divided mainly into two denominations: Congregationalists (43%) and Roman Catholics (35%), Catholics becoming quickly the majority at the end of the Colony. The rest of the population were then largely semi-pagan agnostics; they did not adhere to the Christian faith, nor did they retain much of their beliefs in their own ancient gods.

Native diet during this time consisted mainly of fish, coconuts, pandanus fruit, babai (swamp taro), chicken, and some pork. Housing for Europeans employed in the island was simple: constructed of European and native materials and generally of the bungalow type. Mahaffy described the native clothing as being of "shocking shape" and "atrocious color", and that the style was changing into "kilt(s) of leaves or fine woven mats".

==== Economy ====
In the early to mid 20th century the principal source of income for Gilbert islanders was from working on the production of phosphate from the deposits on Banaba (Ocean Island), an island to the west of the Gilbert Islands. In addition, coconut palms were cultivated on some of the islands. All labor was supervised by the British and every effort was made to see that the wages and living conditions were fair and adequate. (Source?) Sanitary inspections by the British did much to improve the general living conditions on most of the islands.

Arthur Mahaffy noted in 1909 that "extreme poverty is virtually unknown", and that most people on the island owned their own land. Residents paid taxes, with the majority of taxes going back into the community, and a small portion going to the Protectorate.

==== Administration ====
Judged to be about 84% literate, the Gilbertese responded readily to the colony's educational efforts. All education in the islands came under the supervision of the Colonial Education Department whose aims were to educate native boys for employment in government and commercial work, and to standardize the level of education throughout the colony. The bulk of the education was provided by the missions, which maintained all the village schools and trained the native school teachers.

With the availability of European-style medical care life improved. The Phoenix Islands Settlement Scheme sought to provide an outlet through the development of three uninhabited atolls in the Phoenix Islands and was the last attempt at human colonization within the British Empire.

=== Religion ===
Hiram Bingham II (1831–1908) was the first to translate the Bible into Gilbertese, and also wrote hymns for the Gilbertese language. Joanna Gordon-Clark writes of their religious belief:

The Gilbert (and Ellice) Islanders had a strong set of beliefs of their own, pre the Christian missionaries; they had a strong foundation myth, involving trees and the two genders. Their ancestors, they said, had been white skinned and red haired and came from elsewhere, perhaps the West (possibly coinciding with the outward spread of Homo sapiens from Africa and elsewhere). As might be expected, they gave power to the natural forces and gave them names and godly characteristics (sun, moon, etc.) but believed in one spirit god, a bit similar to the god of Genesis, in that he/she seemed to have power over dark and light and so on, and was pretty much invisible. They had a strong belief in behaving properly to their ancestors, and especially their parents, and had well-developed community rules for courtesy to others. Read A Pattern of Islands, by Arthur Grimble, who worked in these islands and on Banaba, for the Colonial Administration, from just before the First World War to the mid thirties, or thereabouts. It is a remarkable, informative, funny and warm-hearted account of these people and their religion. Other religions on the islands figure slightly, and there are remarkable stories of adventures, bravery, political machinations, etc. Probably out of print, but second hand copies are available I think, I have two, and the illustrations are delightful.

=== World War II ===
On the same day as the attack on Pearl Harbor, the Japanese invaded the Gilbert Islands, occupying 3 of them by 9 December 1941.

On 17 August 1942, 221 U.S. Marines of the 2nd Marine Raider Battalion raided Makin from two submarines. The raid was intended by the Americans to confuse the Japanese about US intentions in the Pacific, a feint to draw Japanese attention away from the planned invasion route through the Solomons. It is instead believed to have alerted the Japanese to the strategic importance of the Gilbert Islands and led to their reinforcement and fortification. Marines captured during this operation were subsequently summarily executed by the Japanese, in gross violation of the laws of war. The 19 Marines who died were left behind for the villagers to bury. In 1999, a Marine Honor guard was sent to recover the bodies and found them after a villager showed them where to dig. All were exhumed and were taken to the United States.

Tarawa and Abemama were occupied in force by the Japanese in September 1942 and during the next year garrisons were built up on Betio (Tarawa Atoll), and Butaritari (Makin Atoll). Only nominal forces were placed on other islands in the Gilberts.

On 20 November 1943, the U.S. Army and U.S. 2nd Marine Division landed on Makin and Tarawa, initiating the battles of Makin and Tarawa, in which the Japanese were defeated. The Gilbert Islands were then used to support the invasion of the Marshall Islands in February 1944. The US built bases on Islands.

=== Self-determination ===
The Gilbert and Ellice Islands became autonomous in 1971. From 1975 to 1978, the Ellice Islands were separated, and the Gilberts became the Gilbert Islands colony, which issued stamps under that name. In 1979, the Gilberts opted for independence, becoming the independent state of Kiribati. The Ellice Islands became the independent state of Tuvalu in 1978.

== See also ==
- Naval Base Gilbert Islands

== Bibliography ==
Asian Development Bank, ed. (2009b). Kiribati's political economy and capacity development (PDF). Pacific studies series. Mandaluyong City, Philippines: Asian Development Bank. ISBN 978-971-561-776-5.

Bedford, R., Macdonald, B., & Munro, D. (1980). Population estimates for Kiribati and Tuvalu, 1850–1900: Review and speculation. Journal of the Polynesian Society, 89, 199–246.

Bollard, A. E. (January 1981). "The financial adventures of J. C. Godeffroy and son in the Pacific∗". The Journal of Pacific History. 16 (1): 3–19. doi:10.1080/00223348108572410. ISSN 0022-3344.

Borovnik, Maria (April 2006). "Working overseas: Seafarers' remittances and their distribution in Kiribati". Asia Pacific Viewpoint. 47 (1): 151–161. doi:10.1111/j.1467-8373.2006.00298.x. ISSN 1360-7456.

Burnett, Dr Greg (May 2005). "Language Games and Schooling: Discourses of colonialism in Kiribati education". Asia Pacific Journal of Education. 25 (1): 93–106. doi:10.1080/02188790500032640. ISSN 0218-8791.

Cochrane, Glynn (June 1970). "The Administration of Wagina Resettlement Scheme". Human Organization. 29 (2): 123–132. doi:10.17730/humo.29.2.q07m95236n7q28h4. ISSN 0018-7259.

Correspondent. (1913, 5 June). Modern buccaneers in the West Pacific. New Age, pp. 136–140 (Online). Available: https://dl.lib.brown.edu/pdfs/1140814207532014.pdf (accessed 6 February 2012).

Couper, AD. The island trade: an analysis of the environment and operation of seaborne trade among three islands in the Pacific. Canberra: Australian National University, Department of Geography; 1967.

Couper, AD. Protest movements and proto-cooperatives in the Pacific Islands. Journal of the Polynesian Society 1968; 77: 263–74.

Davis, E.H.M., Captain RN. (1892). Proceedings of H.M.S. Royalist [Online]. Available: http://www.janeresture.com/davisdiaries/captaindavis.html Archived 3 April 2022 at the Wayback Machine and http://www.janeresture.com/nikunau/index.htm Archived 2006-10-16 at the Wayback Machine (accessed 6 February 2012).

Di Piazza, A. (1999). Te Bakoa site. Two old earth ovens from Nikunau Island (Republic of Kiribati). Archaeology in Oceania, 34(1), 40–42.

Di Piazza, A. (2001). Terre d'abondance ou terre de misère: Représentation de la sécheresse à Nikunau (République de Kiribati, Pacifique central) (Land of abundance or land of scarcity? Ideas about drought on Nikunau (Republic of Kiribati, Central Pacific)). L'Homme, 157, 35–58.

Firth, Stewart (1973). "German Firms in the Western Pacific Islands, 1857–1914". Journal of Pacific History. 8 (1): 10–28. doi:10.1080/00223347308572220.

Geddes, W. H. (1977). Social individualisation on Tabiteuea Atoll. Journal of the Polynesian Society, 86, 371–393.

Geddes, W. H., Chambers, A., Sewell, B., Lawrence, R., & Watters, R. (1982), Islands on the Line, team report. Atoll economy: Social change in Kiribati and Tuvalu, No. 1, Canberra: Australian National University, Development Studies Centre.

Goodall, N. (1954). A history of the London Missionary Society 1895–1945. London: Oxford University Press.

Goodenough, W. H. (1955). A problem in Malayo-Polynesian social organization. American Anthropologist, 57, 71–83.

Grimble, A. (1921). From birth to death in the Gilbert Islands. Journal of the Royal Anthropological Institute, 51, 25–54.

Grimble, A. F. (1952). A Pattern of Islands, John Murray, London.

Grimble, A. F. (1957). Return to the Islands: Life and Legend in the Gilberts. John Murray, London

Grimble, A. F. (1989). Tungaru traditions: Writings on the atoll culture of the Gilberts, Honolulu: University of Hawaii Press.

Grimble, A. F., & Clarke, S. G. (1929). Gilbert and Ellice Islands Colony: Instructions and Hints to District Officers, Deputy Commissioners and Sub-accountants, His Britannic Majesty's High Commission for the Western Pacific, Suva, Fiji.

Tabai, I. (1993). The first twelve years, in: H. Van Trease, (Ed) Atoll Politics: The Republic of Kiribati, pp. 309–320 (Christchurch: University of Canterbury, Macmillan Brown Centre for Pacific Studies).

Kazama, K. (2001). Reorganized meeting house system: The focus of social life in a contemporary village in Tabiteuea South, Kiribati. People and Culture in Oceania, 17, 83-113.

Kiribati National Statistics Office. (2009). Keystats workbook (Online). Available: http://www.spc.int/prism/Country/KI/Stats/Economic/GFS/Revenue-Current.htm (accessed 11 September 2011).

Kiribati National Statistics Office. (2009). Statistics (Online). Available: http://www.spc.int/prism/Country/KI/Stats/index.htm (accessed 14 November 2009).

Koch, G. E. (translated by G. Slatter), (1986). The Material Culture of Kiribati, Institute of Pacific Studies of the University of the South Pacific, Suva, Fiji.

Land (Copra) Tax Register 1910–1916. Available in Kiribati National Archives, Tarawa, GEIC 4(11)/II 18.

Latouche, J.-P. (1983). Mythistoire Tungaru: Cosmologies et genealogies aux Iles Gilbert. Paris: Societe d'Etudes Linguistiques et Anthropologiques de France.

Lawrence, R. (1992). "Kiribati: change and context in an atoll world", in Robillard, A. B. (Ed.), Social Change in the Pacific Islands, Kegan Paul International, London, pp. 264–99.

Lévesque, Rodrigue (1989). "Canadian Whalers in Micronesia (1840–1850)". Journal of Pacific History. 24 (2): 225–237. doi:10.1080/00223348908572617.

Lundsgaarde, H. P. (1966). Cultural Adaptation in the Southern Gilbert Islands, University of Oregon, Oregon.

Lundsgaarde, H. P. (1974). The evolution of tenure principles on Tamana Island, Gilbert Islands. In H. P. Lundsgaarde (Ed), Land tenure in Oceania (pp. 179–214). Honolulu: University Press of Hawaii.

Lundsgaarde, H. P. (1978). Post-contact changes in Gilbertese maneaba organization. In N. Gunson (Ed.) The Changing Pacific: Essays in Honour of H. E. Maude (pp. 67–79). Melbourne: Oxford University Press

Lundsgaarde, H. P., & Silverman, M. G. (1972). Category and group in Gilbertese kinship: An updating of Goodenough's analysis. Ethnology, 11, 95–110.

Macdonald, B. (1971). Local government in the Gilbert and Ellice Islands 1892–1969 – part 1. Journal of Administration Overseas, 10, 280–293.

Macdonald, B. (1972). Local government in the Gilbert and Ellice Islands 1892–1969 – part 2. Journal of Administration Overseas, 11, 11–27.

Macdonald, B. K. (1982). Cinderellas of the Empire: Towards a History of Kiribati and Tuvalu, Australian National University Press, Canberra.

Macdonald, B. (1996a). Governance and Political Process in Kiribati (Economics Division Working Papers 96/2), Canberra: Australian National University, National Centre for Development Studies.

Macdonald, B. (1996b). 'Now an island is too big' limits and limitations of Pacific Islands history. Journal of Pacific Studies, 20, 23–44.

Macdonald, B. (1998). Pacific Islands stakeholder participation in development: Kiribati. (Pacific Islands Discussion Paper Series No. 5). Washington, DC: World Bank, East Asia and Pacific Region, Papua New Guinea and Pacific Islands Country Management Unit.

Mason, L. (Ed.). (1985). Kiribati: A Changing Atoll Culture, University of the South Pacific, Institute of Pacific Studies, Suva, Fiji.

Maude, H.C., & Maude, H.E. (Eds.). (1994). An anthology of Gilbertese oral tradition. Suva, Fiji: Institute of Pacific Studies of the University of the South Pacific.

Maude, H.E. (1949). The Co-operative Movement in the Gilbert and Ellice Islands (Technical Paper No. 1), South Pacific Commission, Sydney.

Maude, H.E. (1952). The Colonisation of the Phoenix Islands, Journal of the Polynesian Society, Vol. 61 Nos. 1–2, pp. 62–89.

Maude, H.E. (1963). The Evolution of the Gilbertese Boti: An Ethnohistorical Interpretation, Journal of the Polynesian Society, 72 (Supplement), pp. 1–68.

Maude, H.E. (1964). Beachcombers and Castaways, Journal of the Polynesian Society, 73, pp. 254–293.

Maude, H.E. (1967). "The Swords of Gabriel: A Study in Participant History". Journal of Pacific History. 2 (1): 113–136. doi:10.1080/00223346708572105.

Maude, H.E. (1977a). Foreword, in Sabatier, E. (translated by U. Nixon), Astride the Equator: An Account of the Gilbert Islands, Oxford University Press, Melbourne, pp. v-viii.

Maude, H.E. (1977b). Notes, in Sabatier, E. (translated by U. Nixon), Astride the Equator: An Account of the Gilbert Islands, Oxford University Press, Melbourne, pp. 353–373.

Maude, H.E. (ed.). (1991). The story of Karongoa. Suva, Fiji: Institute of Pacific Studies of the University of the South Pacific.

Maude, H.E., & Doran, E., Jr. (1966). The precedence of Tarawa Atoll. Annals of the Association of American Geographers, 56, 269–289.

Maude, H.E., & Leeson, I. (1965). The Coconut Oil Trade of the Gilbert Island, Journal of the Polynesian Society, 74, pp. 396–437.

McCreery, D., & Munro, D. (1993). The cargo of the Montserrat: Gilbertese labor in Guatemalan coffee, 1890–1908 . The Americas 49, 271–295.

Munro, D, Firth, S. Towards colonial protectorates: the case of the Gilbert and Ellice Islands. Australian Journal of Politics and History 1986; 32: 63–71.

Munro, D, Firth, S. From company rule to consular control: Gilbert Island labourers on German plantations in Samoa. Journal of Imperial and Commonwealth History 1987; 16: 24–43.

Munro, Doug; Firth, Stewart (1990). "German Labour Policy and the Partition of the Western Pacific: The View from Samoa". Journal of Pacific History. 25 (1): 85–102. doi:10.1080/00223349008572627.

Officer on Board the Said Ship. (1767). A voyage round the world in His Majesty's Ship the 'Dolphin', commanded by the honourable commodore Byron. London: J. Newbery and F. Newbery.

Sabatier, E. (translated by U. Nixon), (1977). Astride the Equator: An account of the Gilbert Islands, Oxford University Press, Melbourne.

Siegel, Jeff (1985). "Origins of Pacific Islands Labourers in Fiji". Journal of Pacific History. 20 (1): 42–54. doi:10.1080/00223348508572504.

Ward, J. M. (1946). British policy in the South Pacific (1786–1893). Sydney: Australasian Publishing.

Weeramantry, C. Nauru: environmental damage under international trusteeship. Melbourne: Oxford University Press; 1992

Williams, M., & Macdonald, B. K. (1985). The phosphateers: A history of the British Phosphate Commissioners and the Christmas Island Phosphate Commission. Melbourne University Press, Carlton, Vic.

Willmott, B. (2007). The Chinese communities in the smaller countries of the South Pacific: Kiribati, Nauru, Tonga and the Cook Islands (Macmillan Brown Working Paper Series) [Online]. Available: http://www.pacs.canterbury.ac.nz/documents/Microsoft%20Word%20-%20Willmott_WP17.pdf Archived 2013-05-04 at the Wayback Machine (accessed 6 February 2012).
