= John Hilary Smith =

British Colonial Service administrator (born 1928)

Sir John Smith CBE ATK

Governor of the Gilbert and Ellice Islands
- In office 23 Jul 1973 – 1 October 1978
- Preceded by: John Osbaldiston Field
- Succeeded by: Reginald James Wallace as Governor of the Gilbert Islands

Personal details
- Born: 20 March 1928 (age 98)
- Spouse: Mary Sylvester
- Children: 3
- Education: University College, London
- Occupation: Colonial Administrator
- Awards: Commander of the Most Excellent Order of the British Empire; Kiribati Grand Order

Military service
- Allegiance: United Kingdom
- Branch/service: British Army
- Years of service: 1948-1950
- Unit: Queen's Own Royal West Kent Regiment

John Hilary Smith, CBE, ATK (born 20 March 1928) is a British retired colonial administrator. Smith was the last governor of the united Gilbert and Ellice Islands before it was divided into Tuvalu and what later became Kiribati.

Smith was educated at Cardinal Vaughan Memorial School, University College London, and University College, Oxford. He joined the Colonial Service in 1950 and was stationed in Nigeria from 1951 to 1970. From 1970 to 1973 he was the financial secretary in the British Solomon Islands.

In 1973, Smith became the governor of the Gilbert and Ellice Islands, succeeding John Osbaldiston Field. As governor, he addressed several controversies such as the French research ship Coriolis being denied fresh water due to French President Charles de Gaulle blocking the United Kingdom's entry into the European Common Market and the continuing dispute between the United Kingdom and the United States over the Phoenix and Line Islands.

In 1978, Smith oversaw the granting of independence to the Ellice Islands as Tuvalu. Alongside the Tuvaluan Independence Movement came calls from Banaba (Ocean Island) for independence as well. However, due to the large phosphate deposits there, this was denied and Smith was ordered to suppress the Banaban Independence Movement. Upon Tuvaluan independence, Smith's tenure as governor came to an end. The Gilbert Islands continued as a colony headed by governor Reginald James Wallace until 1979, which it became independent Kiribati.

Following his retirement, in 1979, he was appointed College Secretary and Clerk to the Governors of Imperial College, London. He also guest lectured for two semesters at Duke University in North Carolina and served as Chairman of the Scout Association.

Smith donated his papers to the University of Adelaide. In 1964, he was appointed to the Order of the British Empire and the Commander of the Order of the British Empire in 1970. In 2009, he was appointed to membership of the Kiribati Grand Order.

== Sources ==
- "John Hilary Smith (1928-) Papers 1906-1979", adelaide.edu.au.
