= John Quayle-Dickson =

British military officer (1860-1945)

Resident Commissioner of the Gilbert and Ellice Islands
- In office 1909–1913
- Preceded by: William Telfer Campbell
- Succeeded by: Edward Carlyon Eliot

Personal details
- Born: 1860 Castletown, Isle of Man
- Died: 1945 (aged 84–85) Kent, United Kingdom
- Occupation: Colonial Service

John Quayle-Dickson, DSO (10 or 20 November 1860 – January 1945) was a British military officer and Colonial Service administrator.

Quayle-Dickson was the son of Major General Edward John Dickson of The Green, Castletown, Isle of Man and his wife Lucy Mylrea, née Quayle.

After serving as an intelligence officer during the Second Boer War, he assumed a number of important roles in the field of Native Affairs in South Africa. He was then the Resident Commissioner of the Gilbert and Ellice Islands on Ocean Island from September 1909 to 1913, when he was transferred to be the Colonial Secretary of the Falkland Islands. He was dismissed from his post in the Falklands. Dickson was sent home on 10 June 1914 and his services were terminated by the Colonial Office in September 1914. He became sub-commandant of the Great War POW & Aliens Detention Camp in the Isle of Man.

He is thought to be the anonymous correspondent to The New Age newspaper in 1913, who described the maladministration of William Telfer Campbell as the Resident Commissioner of the Gilbert and Ellice Islands protectorate. In relation to Arthur Mahaffy’s official report into the allegations of maladministration, the newspaper article challenged the partiality of Arthur Mahaffy, because he was a former colonial official in the Gilbert and Ellice Islands Protectorate. The newspaper article also criticised the operations of the Pacific Phosphate Company on Ocean Island.
