= Cyril Cartwright (civil servant) =

Cyril George Fox Cartwright (18 April 1911 – 23 April 1943) was a British Colonial Service administrator. He died during the Japanese occupation of the Gilbert Islands.

== Biography ==
Cartwight was the third son of the Rev. G. F. Cartwright. He attended Winchester College from 1924 to 1930; then he proceeded to Balliol College, Oxford and obtained his degree in 1933. He was appointed to the British Colonial Service and was posted to Ocean Island, which was the administrative centre of the Gilbert and Ellice Islands Colony.

He was acting Resident Commissioner of the Gilbert and Ellice Islands Colony on Ocean Island from December 1941 to August 1942. He was acting on behalf of Vivian Fox-Strangways, who had been appointed as Resident Commissioner, but because of the Pacific War, Fox-Strangways was seconded into the army and was located on Tulagi in the British Solomon Islands.

While he had the opportunity to leave Ocean Island when the personnel of the British Phosphate Commission were evacuated, he choose to stay to safeguard the people of Ocean Island. Japanese forces occupied Ocean Island on 26 August 1942. He was subjected to ill-treatment and malnutrition. He died on 23 April 1943.

He is named on the memorial inscriptions in Chapel Passage, East Wall of Balliol College, Oxford.

== Bibliography ==
- Ellis, Albert Fuller, Sir. 1946. Mid-Pacific Outposts. xx, 303pp, (8vo), 21 cm, with intro. by Brigadier J.R. Stevenson...in command of the Nauru and Ocean Island expedition. appendix 299–303, Instrument of Surrender, attachment (vi) to report by Brig. J.R.S. on surrender of Japanese on Ocean Island dated 2nd Oct. 1945. Brown & Stewart, Auckland. BM DU/711/E47, UH D767.9.E4.
