= HMS Dart (1882) =

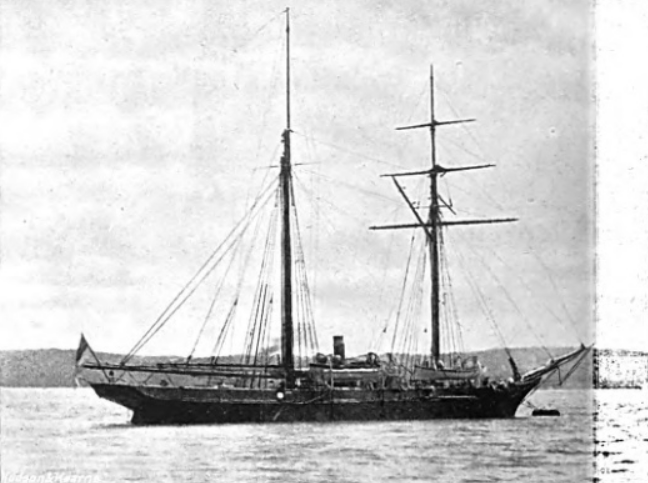
- Dart c.1898

History

United Kingdom
- Name: HMS Dart
- Acquired: March 1882
- Fate: Lent to New South Wales Government in April 1904

General characteristics
- Type: Screw schooner
- Displacement: 470 ton
- Length: 133 ft (41 m)
- Beam: 25.2 ft (7.7 m)
- Depth: 13 1/2 ft (4.1 m)
- Propulsion: 2 cylinder steam engine 16" & 32"-24"
- Notes: Iron frame planked. Designer St Clare Byrne. Sails by Lapthorn and Ramseys

HMS Dart was a schooner of the Royal Navy, built by the Barrow Shipbuilding Company, Barrow and launched in 1877 as Cruiser for Lord Eglinton. She was subsequently purchased by the Colonial Office for the use of Sir Arthur Hamilton Gordon as governor of the Fiji Islands. On his appointment to New Zealand, Cruiser was purchased by the Royal Navy as a tender for the training ship Britannia and the name changed to Dart in March 1882.

== Hydrographic survey work ==
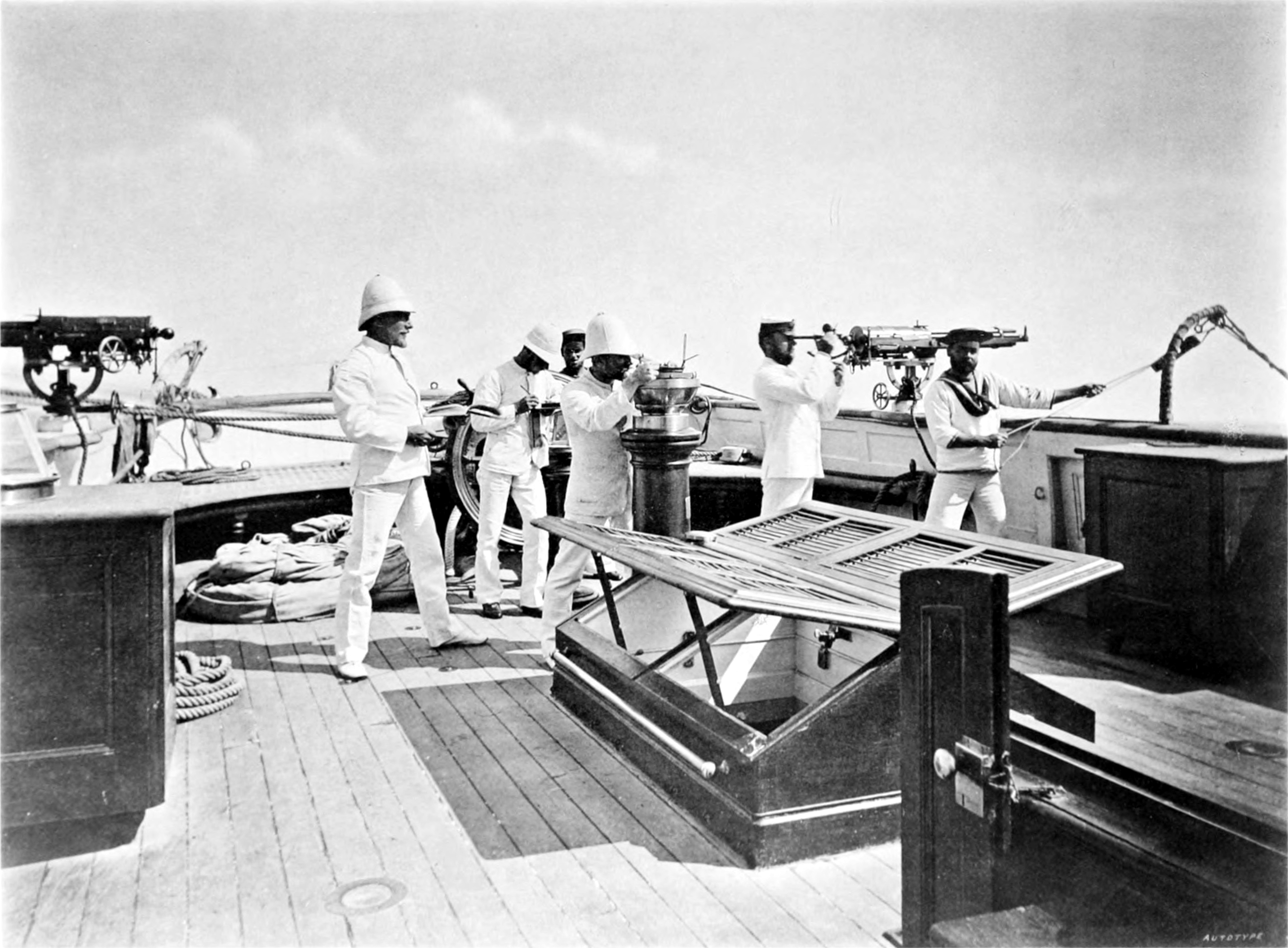
The crew of Dart in 1885

Requisitioned as a yacht for the Commander-in-Chief, Australia Station, she instead was fitted out for survey duties of the Australia Station. She commenced service on the Australia Station in 1883 undertaking hydrographic surveys around Australia, New Zealand and the South Pacific; Survey work was also undertaken in the waters of Fiji, Gilbert and Ellice Islands, Marshall Islands and New Britain Island, from May to September, 1884.

In 1883 Dart became involved with an action in the New Hebrides under the command of Lieutenant-Commander W W Moore. This followed the murder of Captain Belbin of the Borough Belle. A party was landed from Dart and in the engagement that followed, 8 natives and one crew man were killed with another wounded. Punishment in the form of confiscation of weapons and burning of villages took place after the incident.

In 1893 Port Arthur and "Dead Island" (Isle of the Dead) on Australia's Tasman Peninsula were surveyed and published as Admiralty chart 1475.

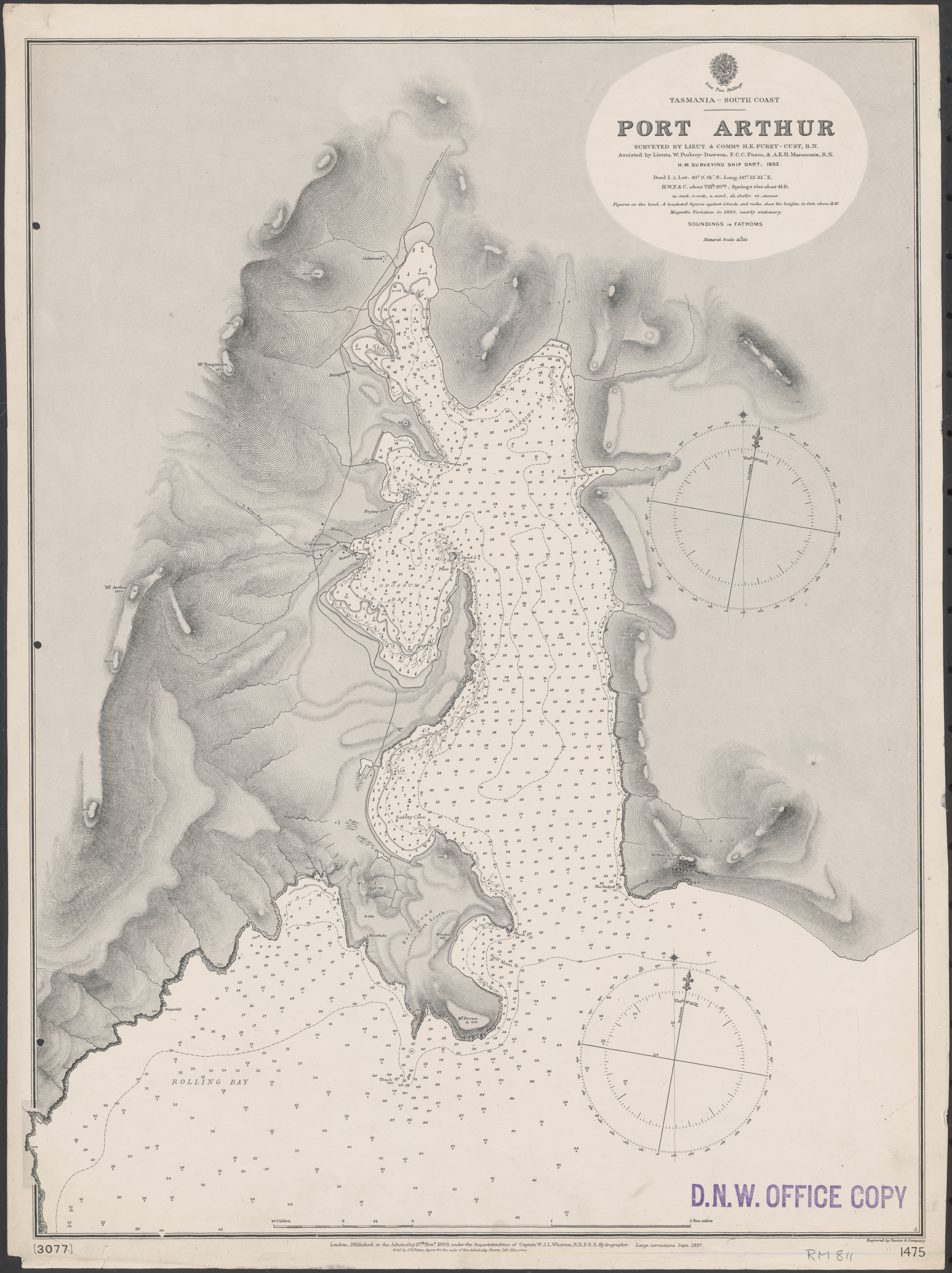
Admiralty Chart No.1475. Hydrographic survey of "Dead Island" and Port Arthur, Tasmania, 1893.

== Later activities ==
In 1885 she became the first command of Arthur Mostyn Field. She was reported as potentially lost on Wednesday 26 June 1889 after a whaleboat was found near North Cape, Auckland, but she later sailed into Sydney. Commander John Franklin Parry was in command from March 1897 until March 1900, when she served as a surveying vessel on the Australia station. Lieutenant Charles Edward Monro was appointed in command on 1 March 1900, the same month she visited Sydney and Hobart. She was in Brisbane in early January 1901. Lieutenant (later Commander) Frederick Claude Coote Pasco was appointed in command in January 1902. She visited Nouméa and the Solomon Islands in June 1902.

She was paid off in 1904 and lent as a training ship to the New South Wales Government. She was sold for £1010 at Sydney on 9 May 1912 to the Victoria State Government for use as a tender to the training ship John Murray. In 1919, she was sold for £1500 to Mr J. Harrison, of the Shipping and Trading Agency. She was again reported lost in July 1919 after wreckage was found near St Helens, Tasmania, but she turned up safely in Hobart. She was sold in 1920 to French owners based in Nouméa. She was known as Jeanne Elisabeth and later Athalai.
