= William Telfer Campbell =

British Colonial Service administrator

Resident Commissioner of the Gilbert and Ellice Islands
- In office 1895–1909
- Preceded by: Charles Richard Swayne
- Succeeded by: John Quayle-Dickson

Personal details
- Born: 19 March 1863 India
- Died: 12 March 1929 (aged 65) Dorset
- Occupation: Colonial Service

William Telfer Campbell (March 19, 1863 – March 12, 1929), born in India, was the second Resident Commissioner of the Gilbert and Ellice Islands protectorate, from 1895 to 1909.

Campbell had started his career in the Royal Irish Constabulary. He was twice the subject of official enquiries into high-handedness, brutality, and the use of forced labour. In 1901 complaints began to reach the United Kingdom of misgovernment in the Gilbert Islands.

The conduct of Campbell was criticised as to his legislative, judicial and administrative management (including allegations of forced labour exacted from islanders) and became the subject of the 1909 report by Arthur Mahaffy. In 1913, an anonymous correspondent to The New Age newspaper described the maladministration of W. Telfer Campbell and challenged the partiality of Arthur Mahaffy, because he was a former colonial official in the Gilbert and Ellice Islands Protectorate. The anonymous correspondent, probably John Quayle-Dickson, also criticised the operations of the Pacific Phosphate Company on Ocean Island.

He was then British consul in Tonga from 1909 to 1913. After being "withdrawn from service in the Pacific", he became Colonial Secretary of the Colony of The Gambia.
