= Reginald James Wallace =

British civil servant

Reginald James Wallace CMG OBE

Governor of the Gilbert Islands
- In office 1 October 1978 – 12 July 1979
- Preceded by: John Hilary Smith
- Succeeded by: Office abolished Kiribati independence

Personal details
- Born: 16 August 1919 Coventry, West Midlands, England
- Died: 10 December 2012 (age 93) Gibraltar

Reginald James Wallace (16 August 1919 – 10 December 2012) was a British Colonial Service administrator. Wallace served as the last colonial Governor of the Gilbert Islands from 1978 to 12 July 1979. The Gilbert Islands, which separated from the neighboring Ellice Islands (now Tuvalu) in 1975, became the independent nation of Kiribati on 12 July 1979. He also served as deputy governor of Gibraltar in his later life

Wallace died on 10 December 2012 at the age of 93. He had been a resident of Gardiner's View, Gibraltar.
