= Governor of the Gilbert and Ellice Islands =

Colonial head of the Gilbert and Ellice Islands civil service (1892–1979)

- Flag from 1937 to 1976
- Style: His Excellency
- Residence: Government House, South Tarawa, Bairiki
- Appointer: Elizabeth II; as Queen of the United Kingdom
- Term length: At Her Majesty's pleasure
- Precursor: Resident Commissioner
- Formation: 1 January 1972
- First holder: John Field
- Final holder: Reginald James Wallace
- Abolished: 12 July 1979
- Succession: President of Kiribati (for the Gilbert Islands); Governor-General of Tuvalu (for the Ellice Islands)

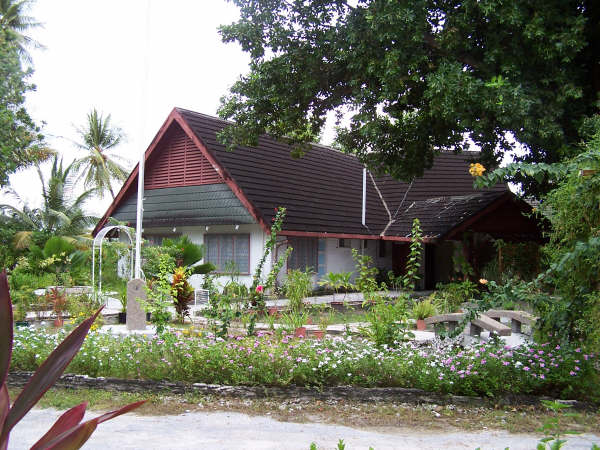
The Presidential residence, former Government House, South Tarawa, Bairiki.

The Governor of the Gilbert and Ellice Islands was the colonial head of the Gilbert and Ellice Islands civil service from 1892 until 1979.

The post was established in 1892 with the title 'Resident Commissioner' by Governor of Fiji John Bates Thurston after the islands were made a British protectorate, having previously been under the supervision of the High Commissioner for the Western Pacific. The Commissioner initially had jurisdiction over only the Ellice Islands. Charles Richard Swayne was appointed as the first Commissioner, arriving in the islands the same year.

In 1893 the responsibilities of Resident were extended to cover the Gilbert Islands, with the title becoming Resident Commissioner of the Gilbert and Ellice Islands. Swayne arrived in the islands in October 1893. His salary was £500 a year, which was covered by local revenue.

In 1895, the headquarters of the protectorate were established in Tarawa before being moved to Ocean Island in 1908, which remained the headquarters until World War II and the Japanese occupation of the Gilbert Islands. At the beginning of the Pacific War, Cyril George Fox Cartwright was acting as Resident Commissioner of the Gilbert and Ellice Islands Colony on Ocean Island from December 1941 to August 1942. He was acting on behalf of Vivian Fox-Strangways, who had been appointed as Resident Commissioner, but because of the Pacific War, Fox-Strangways had been seconded into the British Army with the rank of major and was located on Tulagi in the British Solomon Islands. Following the occupation of Ocean Island by the Japanese forces on 26 August 1942, Fox-Strangways established his office and headquarters on Funafuti in the Ellice Islands. On 22 November 1943 Fox-Strangways landed on Betio islet at the end of Battle of Tarawa, and began to establish the administrative centre of the colony on Tarawa, first on Betio islet and subsequently on Bairiki islet. The provisional headquarters of the colony stayed in Funafuti until 1946 and the rebuilding of Tarawa.

The Gilbert Islands and Ellice Islands became separate colonies in 1976, but remained under a single governor. After the independence of Tuvalu (Ellice Islands) in 1978, the post was renamed the Governor of the Gilbert Islands until the independence of Kiribati the following year.

== List of governors ==
Term	Name
Resident Commissioner
1892–1895	Charles Richard Swayne
1895–1909	William Telfer Campbell
1909–1913	John Quayle-Dickson
1913–1919	Edward Carlyon Eliot
1919–1922	Arthur Grimble (acting)
1922–1925	Herbert Reginald McClure
1925–1933	Arthur Grimble
1933–1938	Jack Barley
1938–1939	Ronald Garvey (acting)
1939–1941	Cyril Cartwright (acting)
1941–1946	Vivian Fox-Strangways
1946–1949	Henry Evans Maude
1949–1952	John Peel
1952–1961	Michael Bernacchi
1961–1969	Val Andersen
1970–1972	John Osbaldiston Field
Governor of the Gilbert and Ellice Islands
1972–1973	John Osbaldiston Field
1973–1978	John Hilary Smith
Governor of the Gilbert Islands
1978–1979	Reginald James Wallace
Sources: Henige, MacDonald.
