= Gilbert and Ellice Islands =

1892–1976 British colony in the Pacific

Coordinates: 1.26°N 173.02°E

Gilbert and Ellice Islands Colony
- 1892–1976
- Flag (from 1937) Coat of arms
- Anthem: "God Save the King/Queen"
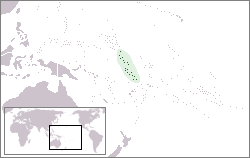
- Status: Protectorate of the United Kingdom (1892–1916); Colony of the United Kingdom (1916–1976)
- Capital: Tarawa (1895–1908 & 1946–1976); Ocean Island (1908–1942); Funafuti (1942–1946)
- Common languages: English (official); Gilbertese; Ellicean; Tokelauan
- Demonyms: Gilbertese and Ellicean
- Monarch
  - 1892–1901: Victoria (first)
  - 1952–1976: Elizabeth II (last)
- Governor
  - 1892–1895: Charles Richard Swayne (first)
  - 1973–1976: John Hilary Smith (last)
- History
  - Protectorate: 1892
  - Colony: 12 January 1916
  - Separation: 1 January 1976

Population
  - 1892: 26,430
  - 1935: 33,713
  - 1936: 34,433
  - 1968: 53,517
- Currency: Pound sterling (1892–1910); Australian pound (1910–66); Australian dollar (1966–76)
Preceded by
1892: Kingdom of Abemama
1945: Japanese occupation of the Gilbert Islands
Succeeded by
1939: Canton and Enderbury Islands
1941: Japanese occupation of the Gilbert Islands
1949: Union Islands
1976: Gilbert Islands
Colony of Tuvalu
- Today part of: Kiribati; Tokelau (NZ); Tuvalu

The Gilbert and Ellice Islands was a British territory in the southern Pacific Ocean from 1892 to 1976, comprising the present-day independent countries of Kiribati and Tuvalu.

The Gilbert Islands and Ellice Islands (the colonial name of Tuvalu) were made British protectorates in 1892 and placed under the jurisdiction of the Western Pacific High Commission. They were administered through a resident commissioner, who based on Tarawa until 1908 and then moved to Ocean Island (Banaba) as the phosphate mining industry on Ocean Island became of economic importance. In 1916, the protectorate was made a Crown colony as the Gilbert and Ellice Islands Colony (GEIC). Portions of the outlying Line Islands and Phoenix Islands were also added the colony.

The Japanese invaded and occupied most of the Gilbert Islands during World War II. British administration resumed after the war's end, with moves towards self-determination beginning in the 1950s. A new constitution was adopted in 1967 allowing for the first general elections and self-government was granted in 1972. The final decades of the colony's existence were marked by tension between the majority Gilbertese and the minority Tuvaluan populations, who spoke different languages and were of Micronesian and Polynesian origin respectively. In 1974, the Ellice Islands voted in favour of separation and the GEIC was split into separate colonies with effect from 1976. Tuvalu and Kiribati achieved full independence in 1978 and 1979, respectively.

== Location ==
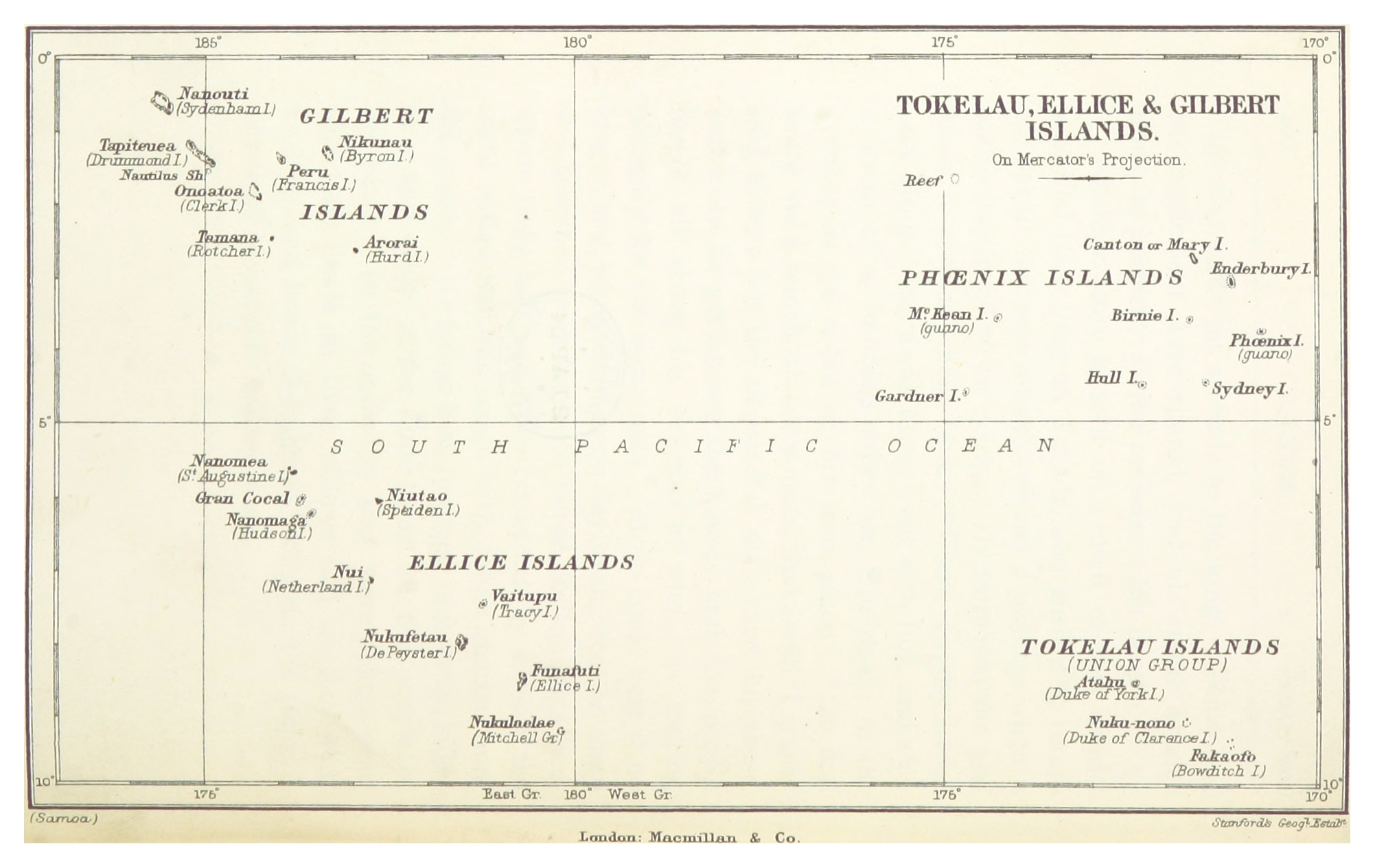
Map of the Southern Gilbert Islands, Ellice Islands and Tokelau, 1884

The Gilbert Islands sometimes also known as Kingsmill Islands or King's-Mill Islands (Note: In some 19th century texts, Kingsmills was applied to the entire Gilberts group. In other 19th century texts, a subset of the northern Gilbert islands was known as Scarborough Islands and a subset of the southern Gilberts as the Kingsmill Group.) are a chain of sixteen atolls and coral islands in the western Pacific Ocean. They are part of Remote Oceania, and traditionally part of the Micronesia subregion of Oceania. The Gilbert Islands are the main part of what is now the Republic of Kiribati ("Kiribati" is the Gilbertese rendition of "Gilberts") The atolls of the Gilbert Islands are arranged in an approximate north-to-south line.

Geographically, the Equator is the dividing line between the northern Gilbert Islands and the southern Gilbert Islands. South of the Gilbert Islands lie the Ellice Islands (now called Tuvalu), which were previously politically connected as part of the GEIC. The Ellice Islands comprise three reef islands and six true atolls, spread out between the latitude of 5° to 10° south and longitude of 176° to 180°, west of the International Date Line. The Ellice Islands are midway between Hawaii and Australia, and they, too, lie in the Polynesia subregion of Oceania.

== European discovery and naming ==
In 1568, when Spanish navigator Álvaro de Mendaña de Neira was commissioned to explore the South Pacific, he sailed relatively close to the Gilbert Islands. He sailed between the Line Islands and the Phoenix Islands, but without sighting land. The first recorded sighting by Europeans of an Ellice Island was on 16 January 1568, when Álvaro de Mendaña sailed past Nui and charted it as Isla de Jesús (Spanish for "Island of Jesus") because the previous day was the feast of the Holy Name. Mendaña made contact with the islanders but was unable to land. During Mendaña's second voyage across the Pacific, he passed Niulakita on 29 August 1595, which he named La Solitaria.

In 1606, Pedro Fernandes de Queirós sighted two of the islands in the Gilbert island group: Butaritari and Makin, which he named the Buen Viaje Islands ('good trip' islands in Spanish).

Commodore John Byron passed through the Ellice islands in 1765, during his circumnavigation of the globe on Dolphin (1751) in company with HMS Tamar (1758). He charted the atolls as Lagoon Islands. Commodore Byron visited Nikunau on 2 July 1765, and the island was referred to on European maps for a while as Byron's Island in his honour and I-Nikunau going away to work as whaling ships' crew were sometimes given the surname, Byron).

Nanumea was sighted by Spanish naval officer Francisco Mourelle de la Rúa who sailed past it on 5 May 1781 with frigate La Princesa, when attempting a southern crossing of the Pacific from the Philippines to New Spain. He charted Nanumea as San Augustin.

In 1788, Thomas Gilbert, a British captain, encountered the archipelago while commanding one of two ships of the First Fleet that were looking for an outer passage route from Port Jackson to Canton. In 1820, a Russian admiral, Johann von Krusenstern, named the group "îles Gilbert" (French for Gilbert Islands) in honor of Captain Gilbert's earlier voyage. Around that time, the French captain Louis Duperrey became the first to map the whole Gilbert Islands archipelago. He commanded La Coquille, circumnavigating the globe between 1822 and 1825.

In 1809, Captain Patterson in the brig Elizabeth sighted Nanumea while passing through the northern Tuvalu waters on a trading voyage from Port Jackson, Sydney, Australia to China. Captain Arent de Peyster sighted the rest of the Ellice island group in 1819, while sailing the ship Rebecca. He named Funafuti atoll "Ellice's Island", after Edward Ellice, a British politician and merchant who owned the ship's cargo. After the work of English hydrographer Alexander George Findlay was published, the name Ellice was applied to all nine islands in the Ellice Island group, which is now called Tuvalu.

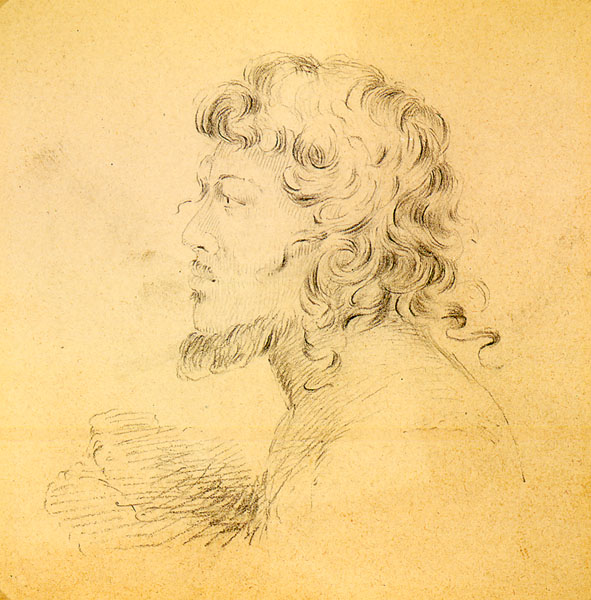
Portrait of a native of the Makin islands, drawn by Alfred Thomas Agate (1841)

Two ships of the United States Exploring Expedition, USS Peacock (1828) and USS Flying Fish (1838), under the command of Captain Hudson, surveyed the Gilbert Islands of Tabiteuea, Nonouti, Aranuka, Maiana, Abemama, Kuria, Tarawa, Marakei, Butaritari, and Makin (Note: The visit to the Gilbert Islands (then called the Kingsmill Islands) is described in United States Exploring Expedition of 1838–1842 The extensive report of the expedition has been digitized by the Smithsonian Institution.) (then called the Kingsmill Islands or Kingsmill Group in English). While in the Gilberts, they devoted considerable time to mapping and charting reefs and anchorages. Alfred Thomas Agate made drawings of men of Butaritari and Makin.

== 'Spheres of influence' in the western and central Pacific ==
Nikunau was the centre of New England and other Atlantic whalers' operations in the 1820s to 1860s on the On-the-Line grounds (the Line refers to the Equator). Coconut oil and copra trading companies from New South Wales, New Zealand and California followed, setting up stations on Butaritari.

In 1886 Britain and Germany agreed to divide up the western and central Pacific, with each claiming a 'sphere of influence'. In the previous decade German traders had become active in Samoa, the Solomon Islands, New Guinea, Marshall Islands and the Caroline Islands. In 1877 the Governor of Fiji was given the additional title of High Commissioner for the Western Pacific. However, the claim of a 'sphere of influence' that included the Ellice Islands and the Gilbert Islands did not result in the immediate move to govern those islands. Ships from the navies of the United States of America and European powers that visited the Gilbert and Ellice Islands included:

=== United Kingdom ===
Ships of the Royal Navy, on the Australian Station, were involved in suppressing the coercive labour recruitment practices, known as blackbirding in the South Pacific Ocean.

- 1872: from 10 to 14 October, the sloop HMS Blanche (1867), under Captain Cortland Herbert Simpson, visited Tawara, Abaiang and Butaritari. Also in 1872, the sloop Basilisk (1848), under Captain John Moresby, visited the Gilberts, and the corvette HMS Barossa (1860), under Captain Lewis James Moore, visited Tabiteuea.
- 1873: from 28 to 30 June, the schooner HMS Alacrity (1872), under Captain Francis W. Sanders, lands islanders on Tabiteuea and Maiana who had been kidnapped in 1871 by the brig Carl. The screw sloop HMS Dido (1869) also visited the Gilberts in 1873.
- 1874: in August, the screw sloop HMS Rosario (1860), under Commander Arthur Edward Dupuis, visited Tawara and Abaiang searching for William "Bully" Hayes, who was notorious for his blackbirding activities.
- 1875: the survey ship HMS Myrmidon (1867), under Commander Richard Hare, visited the Gilberts.
- 1876: from April to June, the schooner HMS Renard (1873), under Lieutenant Horace J. M. Pugh, visited Abaiang and Tawara, regarding the murders in 1874, of Cornelius Sullivan on Tarawa, and St. John C. Keyes on Abaiang. The screw sloop HMS Sappho (1873), under Commander Noel Stephen Fox Digby, was also sent to the Gilberts in support of HMS Renard.
- 1881: from 13 May to 6 June, the corvette HMS Emerald (1876), under Captain William Maxwell, visited the Gilbert and Ellice Islands.
- 1883: from 26 May to 10 June, the sloop HMS Espiegle (1880), under Captain Cyprian Bridge, visited the Gilbert and Ellice Islands.
- 1884: from 13 June to 26 July, the survey ship HMS Dart (1882), under Lieutenant-Commander W. W. Moore, visited the Gilbert and Ellice Islands.
- 1886: from 10 May to 26 June, the sloop HMS Miranda, under Commander Eustace Rooke, visited the Gilbert and Ellice Islands.
- 1892: from 14 April to 30 August, the screw sloop HMS Royalist, under Captain Edward Davis, visited the Gilbert and Ellice Islands.

=== United States ===
- 1825: the schooner USS Dolphin (1821), under Lieutenant Hiram Paulding, visited Nikunau and Tabiteuea.
- 1870: from 15 to 26 May, the sloop USS Jamestown (1844), under Captain William Truxtun, visited Tawara, Abaiang and Butaritari.
- 1872: in August, the sloop USS Narragansett (1859) visited Nikunau, Beru, Tabiteuea, Abaiang and Tawara.
- 1889: the steam powered sloop USS Iroquois (1859) visited Butaritari.

=== France ===
- 1874: the corvette L'Ariane visited Arorae and Ocean Island.
- 1888: the cruiser Le Fabert, under Commander Benoit, visited Nikunau, Nonouti and Butaritari to deliver Father Joseph Leray, Father Edward Bontemps and Brother Conrad Weber, Roman Catholic Missionaries of the Sacred Heart, who were the first Roman Catholic missionaries to arrive in the Gilberts.

=== Germany ===
- 1888: SMS Eber of the German Kaiserliche Marine (Imperial Navy), was sent to the Pacific to serve in the German colonial empire. She visited the Gilberts, and also disarmed the inhabitants of Nauru, ending their civil war and annexing the island to the German Empire.
- 1891: the steam corvette SMS Alexandrine visited the Gilberts (Marakei, Tawara, Abaiang, Abemama and Tabiteuea). Also in 1891, the gunboat SMS Wolf (1878) visited Tawara, Abaiang and Maiana, and the cruiser SMS Sperber visited Butaritari, Maiana and Tabiteuea.

== Administration of the Gilbert and Ellice Islands ==
=== The Pacific Islanders Protection Act 1872 & 1875 ===
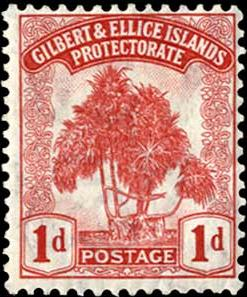
Stamp of the Gilbert & Ellice Islands Protectorates, depicting a Pandanus pine (1911)

In 1872, the United Kingdom passed legislation in an attempt to control the coercive labour recruitment practices known as blackbirding: the Pacific Islanders Protection Act 1872 (35 & 36 Vict. c. 19) (the principal act), which was amended by the Pacific Islanders Protection Act 1875 (38 & 39 Vict. c. 51). The principal act provided for the governor of one of the Australian colonies to have the authority to licence British vessels in the South Pacific Ocean to carry "native labourers". The 1875 act amended that licensing system and stated that any "British vessel may, under the principal Act, be detained, seized, and brought in for adjudication by any officer, all goods and effects found on board such vessel may also be detained, seized, and brought in for adjudication by such officer, either with or without such vessel" with the "High Court of Admiralty of England and every Vice-Admiralty Court in Her Majesty's dominions out of the United Kingdom shall have jurisdiction to try and condemn as forfeited to Her Majesty or restore any vessel, goods, and effects alleged to be detained or seized in pursuance of the principal Act or of this Act". (Note: Other acts on the same subject: Pacific Island Labourers Act 1880; Pearl-Shell and Bêche-de-mer Fishery Act 1881; Native Labourers Protection Act 1884.) The 1875 act also provided authority for "Her Majesty to exercise power and jurisdiction over Her subjects within any islands and places in the Pacific Ocean not being within Her Majesty's dominions, nor within the jurisdiction of any civilized power, in the same and as ample a manner as if such power or jurisdiction had been acquired by the cession or conquest of territory", although the 1875 act did not specify any Pacific islands to which this authority was to be applied.

The 1872 and 1875 acts were intended to work in conjunction with the British Slave Trade Act to provide the authority to arrest blackbirding ships, and charge their captains and owners with slavery charges. However, this approach to suppressing blackbirding was not successful. In 1869, Commander George Palmer of HMS Rosario, commenced a prosecution in the New South Wales courts of Thomas Pritchard and Captain Dagget of the Daphne. Commander Palmer had found the Daphne in harbour at Levuka in Fiji fitted out like an "African slaver", and filled with Islanders on board looking emaciated and having little knowledge of why they were on the ship. The Daphne was owned by Henry Ross Lewin, a long time blackbirder who had been commissioned to import south sea islanders for Robert Towns' sugar plantations (the entrepreneur after whom Townsville is named). Despite this, Sir Alfred Stephen, the Chief Justice of New South Wales, found Pritchard and Dagget innocent on the grounds that the Slave Trade Act did not apply to the South Pacific Ocean.

=== Protectorate, 1892–1916 ===
In 1877, British subjects within the Gilbert and Ellice Islands were placed under the jurisdiction of the newly created High Commissioner for the Western Pacific, an office vested in the governor of Fiji. In 1886, an Anglo-German agreement partitioned the "unclaimed" central Pacific, leaving Nauru in the German sphere of influence, while placing Ocean Island and the future GEIC in the British sphere of influence.

German New Guinea was established in 1884, and German protectorates were established on the Marshall Islands and Nauru, in 1885 and 1888, respectively. Then, between 27 May and 17 June 1892, partly in response to the presence of the United States in Butaritari, Captain Edward Davis of HMS Royalist made the sixteen islands of the Gilbert Islands a British protectorate. Between 9 and 16 October of the same year, Captain Herbert Gibson of HMS Curacoa declared the Ellice Islands to be a British protectorate. The British government found it administratively convenient to govern the Ellice and Gilberts islands together.

Sir John Bates Thurston appointed Charles Richard Swayne as the first resident commissioner of the Ellice Islands in 1892 and as the first resident commissioner of the Gilbert Islands in 1893. He was succeeded in 1895 by William Telfer Campbell, who established himself on Tarawa, (Note: Tarawa was chosen as the capital of the protectorate mainly because its lagoon has an opening large enough for ships to comfortably pass through. (Tarawa means «the pass» in the Gilbertese language.) and remained in office until 1908. Campbell was criticised for his legislative, judicial and administrative management. It was alleged that he extracted forced labour from the islanders. An inquiry into this allegation was held by Arthur Mahaffy, a former district officer in the Gilbert and Ellice Islands (1896–1898) and Solomon Islands (1898–1904), and he issued his findings, which were published in 1910. In 1913, an anonymous correspondent to The New Age journal described the maladministration of Telfer Campbell, linked it to criticisms of the Pacific Phosphate Company, which was operating on Ocean Island, and challenged Mahaffy's impartiality, because he was a former colonial official in the Gilbert and Ellice Islands Protectorate.

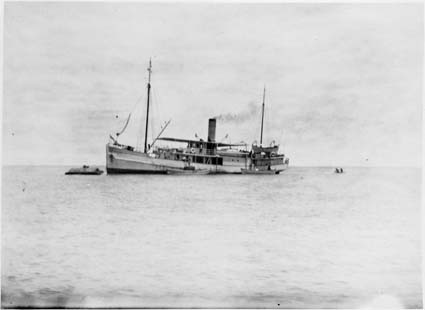
SS Tokelau: Government Steamer Gilbert & Ellice Islands Protectorates (30 April 1909)

In 1908, the government's headquarters was moved to Ocean Island (today known as Banaba). Ocean Island had been hastily added to the protectorate in 1900 to take advantage of the improved shipping connections resulting from the Pacific Phosphate Company's increased activities. On 12 January 1916, the islands' status was changed to that of a Crown Colony. The British colonial authorities emphasised that their role was to procure labour for phosphate mining on Ocean Island, and to maintain law and order among the workers.

=== Gilbert and Ellice Islands Colony (GEIC) ===
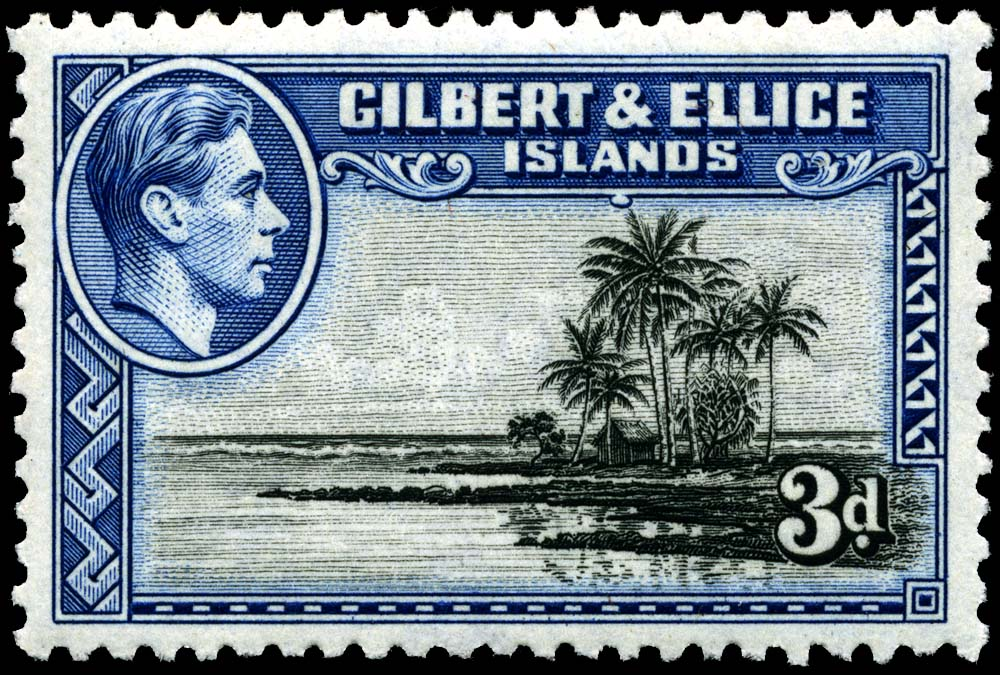
1939 stamp of the Gilbert and Ellice Island Colony

The islands became a Crown colony on 12 January 1916 by the Gilbert and Ellice Islands Order in Council, 1915. (Note: "This process started on 10 November 1915 when, by Order in Council, the protectorate became the Gilbert and Ellice Islands Colony. To this was added Ocean Island on 27 January 1916, along with the northern Line Islands that had been annexed in 1888, which included Washington (Teraina) and Fanning (Tabuaeran), where a trans-Pacific cable station was to be built. Later in 1916, the Tokelau group was added; Christmas Island (Kiritimati) followed in 1919. The new Crown Colony, known in Whitehallspeak as GEIC, then sprawled over 5,000,000 km2 of ocean." The Gilbert and Ellice Islands Protectorate was annexed and made a colony by the Gilbert and Ellice Islands Order in Council, 1915 (S.R. & 0. 1915, TII, p. 315); see also Orders in Council, 27 January, 29 February 1916 (S.R. & 0. 1916, Nos. 99, 167); Order in Council, 1919 (S.R. 8; 0. 1919, No. 773))

During the year 1916, the Union Islands (Tokelau) were also annexed to the Gilbert and Ellice Islands colony. On 28 November 1919, Great Britain reasserted its claim to Christmas Island and annexed it to the colony.

In July 1920, the Pacific Phosphate Company was liquidated and its assets sold to the British Phosphate Commission (BPC), a consortium established by the governments of Great Britain, Australia and New Zealand. The mining of the phosphate on Ocean Island represented the main revenue of the colony until it ended in 1979.

In 1925, Great Britain asked New Zealand to accept responsibility for the administration of the Union Islands (Tokelau) and invited the United States to annex Swains Island. On 4 March 1925, the United States officially annexed Swains Island as part of the territory of American Samoa. On 11 February 1926, an Order in Council transferred responsibility for administration of the Union Islands (Tokelau) to New Zealand which in turn placed administration of the islands under its Western Samoan mandate.

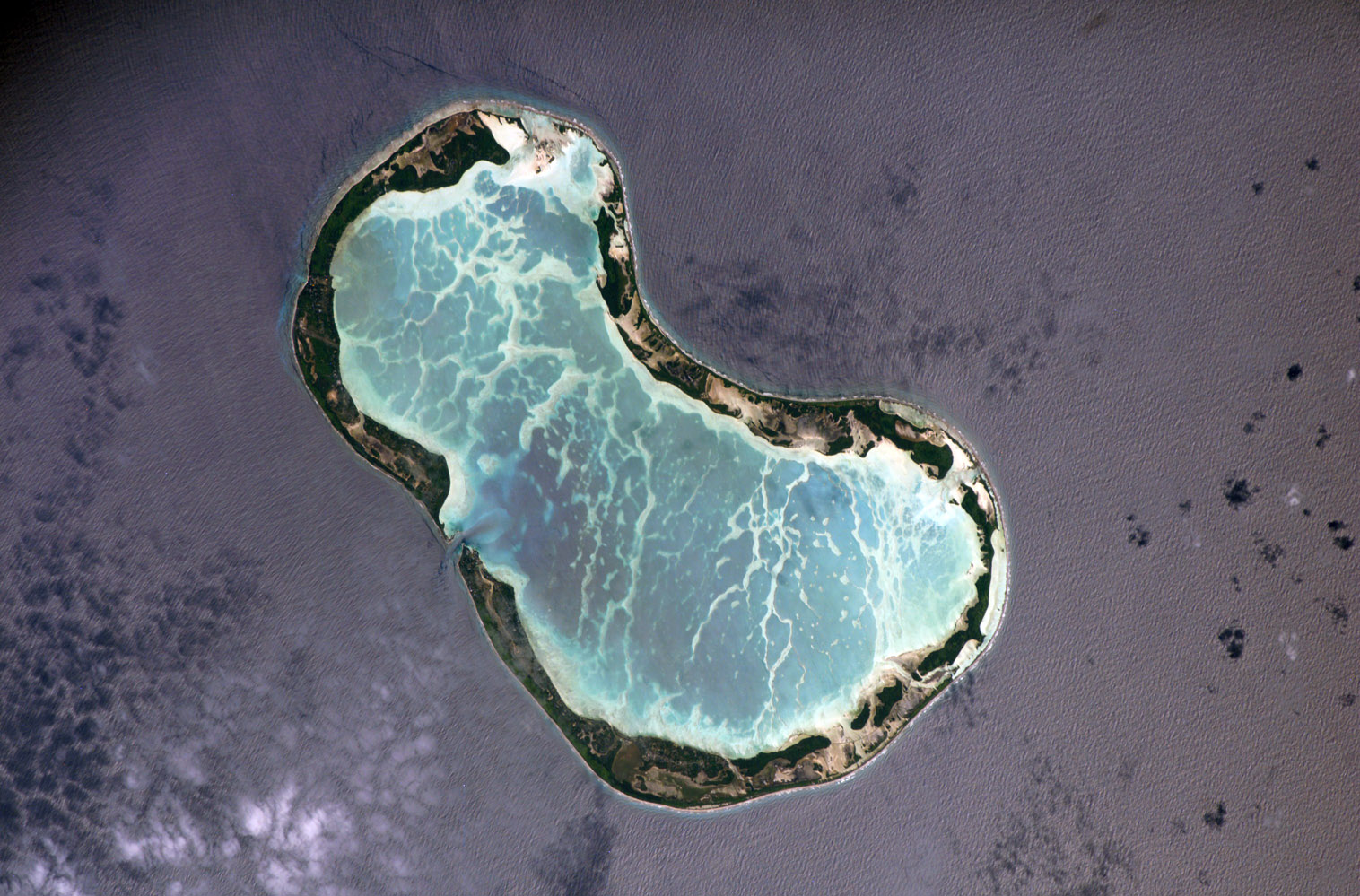
Fanning Island or Tabuaeran

Fanning Island and Washington Island also became included in the colony together with the Union Islands (now known as Tokelau); Christmas Island was included in 1919 but was unofficially contested by the USA under its Guano Islands Act of 1856. The Union Islands were transferred to New Zealand in 1926, but formally only in 1948. (Note: The Union Islands (Revocation) Order in Council, 1948, after reciting the agreement by the governments of the United Kingdom and New Zealand that the islands should become part of New Zealand, revoked the Union Islands (No. 2) Order in Council, 1925, with effect from a date fixed by the Governor-General of New Zealand.)

The Gilbert and Ellice Islands colony continued to be administered by a Resident Commissioner. In 1930 the Resident Commissioner, Arthur Grimble, issued revised laws, Regulations for the good Order and Cleanliness of the Gilbert and Ellice Islands, which replaced laws created during the BWTP.

In the 1930s, British officials tried to choose a less cumbersome name for the GEIC. Critics jocularly called the arbitrary collection of atolls scattered across the central Pacific the "Gilbert and Sullivans" (a reference to the famous light opera composers). One official suggested renaming the islands "Quateria" (after the word "quarters"), because the main inhabited archipelago extends over four notable quarters of the globe: It lies partly north and partly south of the equator, and also partly east and partly west of the international dateline. There were indigenous names, such as Tungaru and Tuvalu, but they were used to refer to only some of the islands in the group; they did not include the mostly uninhabited Phoenix and Line island groups, or Banaba (also called Ocean Island), whose phosphate rocks provided half of the GEIC's tax revenue. Further complicating the naming problem, the Tokelau atolls were made part of the colony for a decade (1916–1926), and at one point a governor of Fiji, Sir J.B. Thurston, suggested adding Rotuma to the colony to enable a more organized administration of islands that were scattered over such a vast expanse of water. In 1969, after political issues arose that had led to the creation, four years earlier, of the Gilbertese National Party, the hybrid term "Tungavalu" was suggested (combining the indigenous names for the islands of Tungaru and Tuvalu); the idea was rejected because of political tensions between those islands.

On 31 December 1936, the population of the Crown Colony totalled 34,443 inhabitants, including 32,390 Gilbert and Ellice Islanders, 262 Europeans and 923 Chinese ("Mongoloids"). Henry Evans Maude, the land commissioner of the colony, considered the then colony overcrowded. The Phoenix Islands were added to the colony in 1937 with the view of a Phoenix Islands Settlement Scheme. On 6 August 1936, a party from HMS Leith landed on Canton Island in the Phoenix Group and planted a sign asserting British sovereignty in the name of King Edward VIII. On 18 March 1937, Great Britain annexed the uninhabited Phoenix Islands (except Howland and Baker Islands) to the Gilbert and Ellice Islands colony.

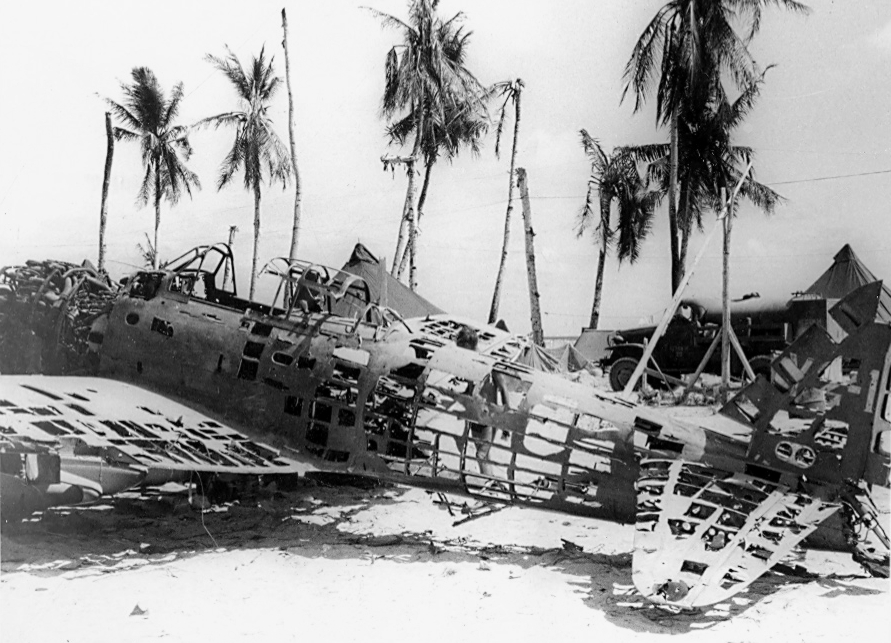
Aichi D3A Japanese plane wrecked in Tarawa

Banaba (Ocean Island) remained the headquarters of the colony until the British evacuation in 1942 during the Pacific War when Ocean Island and the Gilbert Islands were occupied by the Japanese. The United States forces landed in Funafuti on 2 October 1942 and on Nanumea and Nukufetau in August 1943 and constructed an airfield on each island and other bases. The atolls of Tuvalu acted as a staging post during the preparation for the Battle of Tarawa and the Battle of Makin that commenced on 20 November 1943. During the battle of Makin, the escort carrier USS Liscome Bay was torpedoed and sunk by a Japanese submarine on 24 November, this led to the death of 600 crew members and also the Navy Cross recipient Doris Miller. Colonel Vivian Fox-Strangways, was the Resident Commissioner of the Gilbert and Ellice Islands Colony in 1941, who was located on Funafuti.

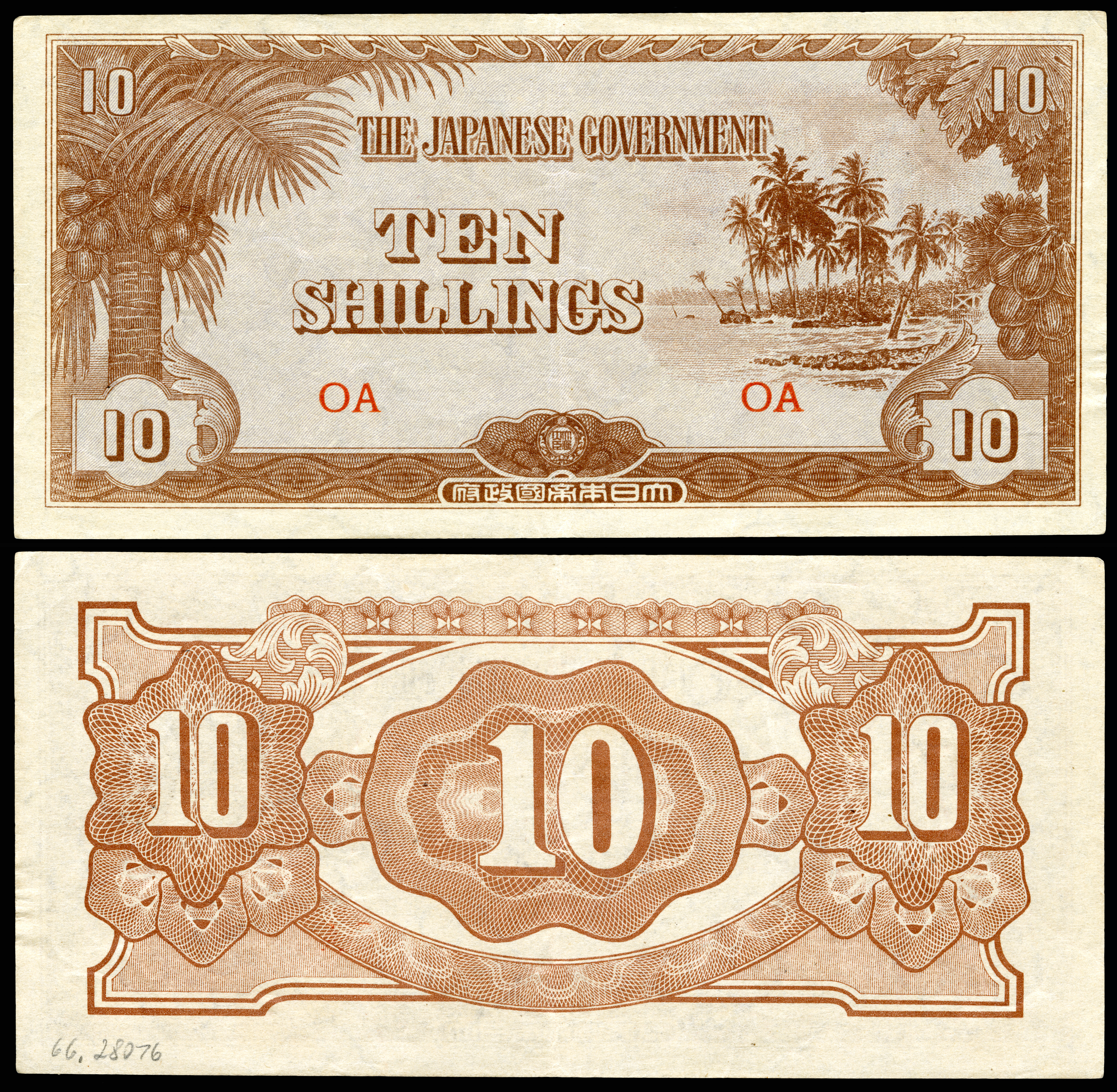
10 shillings note of the Japanese occupation currency, 1942

After World War II, the colony headquarters was re-established on Tarawa, first on Betio islet and subsequently on Bairiki islet. In November 1945, Fox-Strangways was replaced as Resident Commissioner by Henry Evans Maude (1946 to 1949). He was succeeded by John Peel, who retired in 1951.

By the Tokelau Act of 1948, sovereignty over Tokelau was transferred to New Zealand. The five islands of the Central and Southern Line Islands were added to the colony in 1972.

=== Transition to self-determination ===
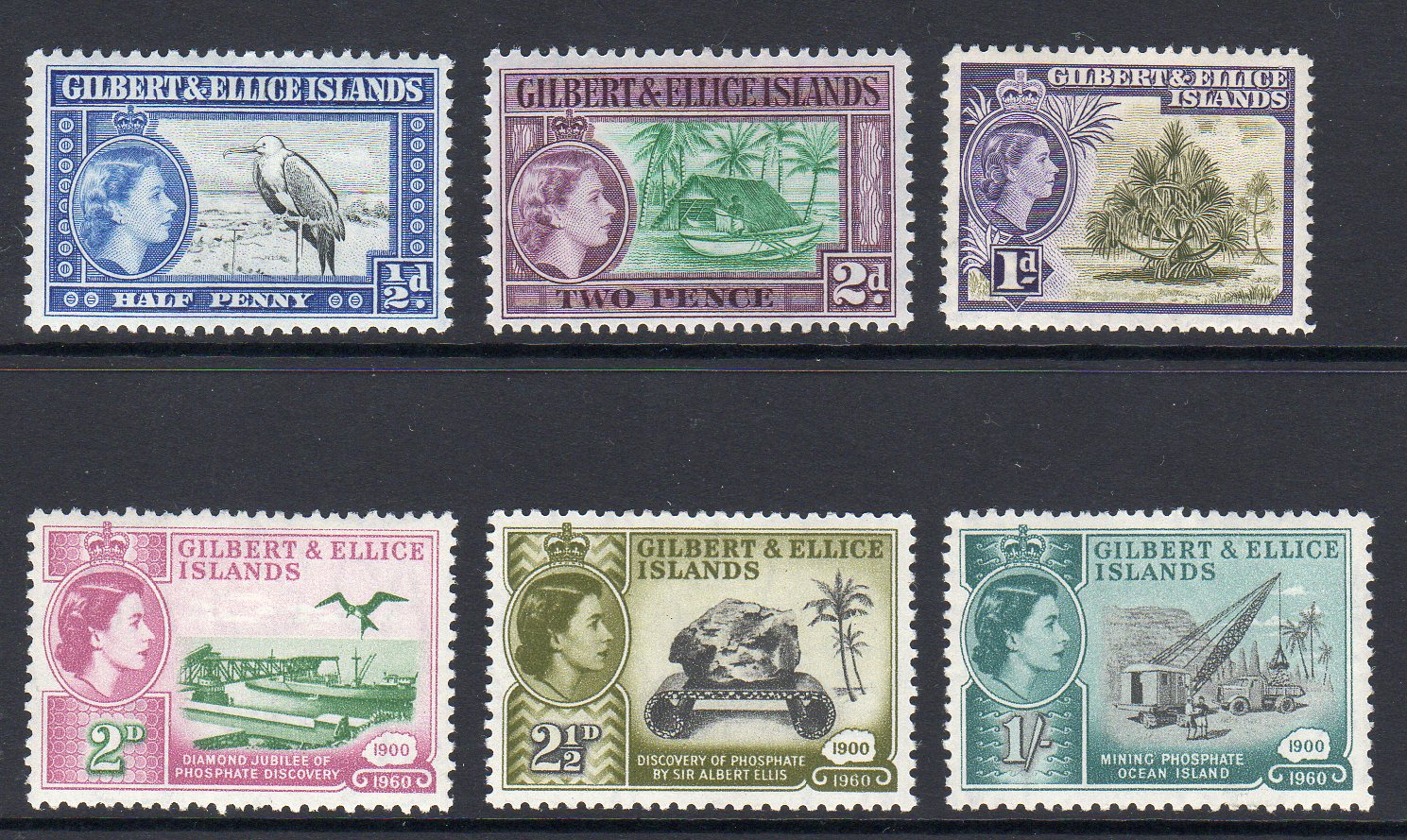
1956 stamps of the Gilbert and Ellice Island Colony

In 1946, Tarawa, in the Gilbert Islands, was made the administrative capital, replacing Ocean Island. The headquarters of the Colony were transferred from Betio to Bairiki. This development included establishing the King George V Secondary School for boys and the Elaine Bernacchi Secondary School for girls.

A Colony Conference was organised at Marakei in 1956, which was attended by officials and representatives (magistrates) from each island in the Gilbert and Ellice Islands Colony, conferences were held every two years until 1962. The development of administration continued with the creation in 1963 of an Advisory Council of five officials and 12 representatives who were appointed by the Resident Commissioner. In 1964 an Executive Council was established with eight officials and eight representatives. The representative members were elected in the Gilbert and Ellice Islands Advisory Council election held in 1964. The Resident Commissioner was now required to consult the Executive Council regarding the creation of laws to make decisions that affected the Gilbert and Ellice Islands Colony.

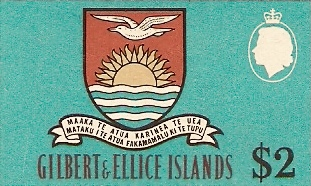
1968 Gilbert & Ellice stamp, after A$ first introduction, representing the coat of arms of the colony (1937–1976)

The Tungaru Association was created by Reuben Uatioa to "promote Gilbertese culture and interests", and in 1965, the Gilbertese National Party, first political party of the colony, was established with the same leader, protesting about the lack of consideration that British rulers have towards Gilbertese, preferring somehow the Ellicean civil servants. The Elliceans (further Tuvaluans) were concerned about their minority status in the Gilbert and Ellice Islands Colony. In 1974, ethnic differences within the colony caused the Polynesians of the Ellice Islands to vote for separation from the Gilbert Islands (later Kiribati). On 1 October 1975, the Ellice Islands became the separate British colony of Tuvalu, but the separation was completed on 1 January 1976.

A Constitution was introduced in 1967, which created a House of Representatives for the Gilbert and Ellice Islands colony that comprised seven appointed officials and 23 members elected by the islanders. Tuvalu elected four members of the House of Representatives. The 1967 Constitution also established the Governing Council. The House of Representatives only had the authority to recommend laws; the Governing Council had the authority to enact laws following a recommendation from the House of Representatives.

A select committee of the House of Representatives was established to consider whether the constitution should be changed to give legislative power to the House of Representatives. The proposal was that Ellice Islanders would be allocated 4 seats out of 24 member parliament, which reflected the differences in populations between Ellice Islanders and Gilbertese. It became apparent that the Elliceans were concerned about their minority status on the Gilbert and Ellice Islands Colony, and the Elliceans wanted equal representation to that of the Gilbertese. A new constitution was introduced in 1971, which provided that each of the Ellice Islands (except Niulakita) elected one representative. However, that did not end the Tuvaluan movement for separation.

In 1974 Ministerial government was introduced in the Gilbert and Ellice Islands colony through a change to the Constitution.

Until 1977, the Gilbert and Ellice Islands Colony (GEIC) was designated ISO 3166-1 alpha-2 (country code "GE").

=== Elections and the transition to parliamentary government ===
The 1967 constitution created a House of Representatives (parliament), whose members were elected in the following elections:

- 1967 Gilbert and Ellice Islands general election
- 1971 Gilbert and Ellice Islands general election
- 1974 Gilbert and Ellice Islands general election

=== Dissolution of the Gilbert and Ellice Islands colony ===
A referendum was held in Ellice Islands, including Elliceans living in Ocean Island and Tarawa, from July to September 1974, using a rolling ballot, to determine whether the Gilbert Islands and Ellice Islands should each have their own administration. The result of the referendum, was that 3,799 Elliceans voted for separation from the Gilbert Islands and continuance of British rule as a separate colony, and 293 Elliceans voted to remain as the Gilbert and Ellice Islands colony. There were 40 spoilt papers.

As a consequence of the 1974 Ellice Islands self-determination referendum, separation occurred in two stages. The Tuvaluan Order 1975 made by the Privy Council, which took effect on 1 October 1975, recognised Tuvalu as a separate British dependency with its own government. The second stage occurred on 1 January 1976 when two separate administrations were created out of the civil service of the Gilbert and Ellice Islands Colony. The British conducted a formal inquiry into Tuvaluan attitudes towards secession, and announced that a referendum was to be held, in which Tuvaluans could choose to remain with the Gilberts or secede. They were told that if they separated they would not receive royalties from the Ocean Island phosphate or other assets of the colony. Despite this, 3,799 Tuvaluans (92%) voted to secede, while 293 voted against separation. On 1 October 1975, legal separation from the Gilbert Islands (now Kiribati), took place. On 1 January 1976, full administration of the new colony was transferred from South Tarawa to Funafuti. Tuvalu became an independent constitutional monarchy and the 38th member of the Commonwealth of Nations on 1 October 1978.

The Gilbert Islands attained independence on 12 July 1979 under the name Kiribati by the Kiribati Independence Order 1979, as a republic with Commonwealth membership. That day the colonial flag was lowered for the last time with a parade commemorating both the newly independent state and in memorial of the intense battles fought on Tarawa in World War II. The parade included many dignitaries from home and abroad. The name Kiribati (pronounced kʲiriˈbas) is the local writing rendition of "Gilberts" in the Gilbertese language.

Banaba, formerly rich in phosphates before becoming fully depleted in the latter colonial years, also sued for independence in 1979 and boycotted the Kiribati ceremonies. The Banabans wanted greater autonomy and reparations of around $250 million for revenue they had not received and for environmental destruction caused by phosphate mining practices similar to those on Nauru. The British authorities had relocated most of the population to Rabi Island, Fiji, after 1945, but by the 1970s some were returning to Banaba. The British rejected the Banaban independence proposal, and the island remained under the jurisdiction of Kiribati.

== Social history ==
In 1926, Donald Gilbert Kennedy was the headmaster of Elisefou (New Ellice) on Vaitupu. He was instrumental in establishing the first co-operative store (fusi) on Vaitupu, which became a model for the bulk purchasing and selling cooperative stores established in the Gilbert and Ellice Islands Colony to replace the stores operated by Palagi traders.

In 1935, there were 33,713 people in the Colony. (Compared to 1934 when the figures were): Gilbertese, 29,291 (28,654); Ellice Islanders, 4,154 (4,042); Europeans, 244 (254); Chinese (exclusive of indentured labourers), 24 (41).

In 1935, there were 6,924 children receiving primary standard education through 4 government schools and 79 mission schools operated by the London Missionary Society (LMS) and the Roman Catholic Sacred Heart Order. Throughout the Gilbert Islands, instruction was given in the Gilbertese language, except at the King George V. School (Tarawa) and the Sacred Heart Boys' School (Butaritari), where instruction was delivered in English. In the Ellice Islands, instruction was delivered in the Samoan language, due to the influence of the early LMS Samoan missionaries and the affinity of the Ellice language with Samoan. During 1935 two students of the King George V. School were sent to the Central Medical School at Suva, Fiji. This made 4 students, 2 Gilbertese and 2 Ellice Islanders being trained as Native Medical Practitioners (as medical practitioners from the islands were described). Eight former students of King George V. School were employed as Native Medical Practitioners in the Colony.

In 1953, the enrolments were: in 12 government schools (722 pupils); the London Missionary Society (4,392); the Roman Catholic Sacred Heart Mission (3,088); and the Seventh Day Adventist Mission, which established schools in the Gilberts in 1950 (165).

New premises for the King George V. School were opened on Bikenibeu, Tarawa, with 109 students, some of whom came from the Government Temporary School at Abemama and other boys came from Elisefou school on Vaitupu, which was also closed. A new curriculum was introduced for primary schools which included instruction in English to the older aged students. The lack of proficiency in the English language was limiting the performance of students at the secondary school level and those seeking to attend universities in other countries.

The Gilbert and Ellice Islands were represented at the 1963 Pacific Games at Suva, Fiji, by tennis players, and also table tennis players who won a bronze medal. A larger team was sent to the 1966 Pacific Games at Nouméa, New Caledonia, including athletes to compete in the half-mile, mile, and the high jump event.

In 1965 King George V and Elaine Bernacchi School were merged.

A census in 1968 counted the population of the colony at 53,517 residents. 44,206 were in the Gilbert Islands, 5,782 in the Ellice Islands, 2,192 in Ocean Island and 1,180 in the Line Islands. From this total 7,465 were "Polynesians" (mostly from the Ellice Islands) and 1,155 "Others" (Europeans and Mongoloids). (Note: Mongoloid is an obsolete racial grouping of various peoples indigenous to large parts of Asia and other places. In the context of the Gilbert and Ellice Islands census of 1968, 'Mongoloid' was used in the census results to identify residents of Chinese ancestry.)

== Postal history ==
The Gilbert and Ellice Islands used their own postage stamps from 1911.

== Sources ==
- Stanton, W. R. (1975). The Great United States Exploring Expedition of 1838–1842. Berkeley: University of California Press. ISBN 9780520025578.
