= Karotu =

Gilbertese warrior and landowner (died c.1860)

Teng Karotu

Uea of Abemama, Kuria and Aranuka
- Reign: c. 1800 – c. 1840
- Successor: Tawaia
- Issue: Tawaia; Baiteke; Binatake
- Father: Namoriki

Teng Karotu (fl. 1790 – c. 1860) was the first uea (high chief) of Abemama, Kuria and Aranuka. (Note: According to H. E. Maude, Karotu was recognised as the first uea (high chief) of Abemama, Kuria and Aranuka. Airam Teeko, a cousin of Bauro, said the same thing in his history of Abemama, which was a source cited by Maude. In contrast to Maude and Teeko, R. G. Roberts, who Maude also cited, wrote that Karotu was not given the title of uea but inherited the title of mataniwi-iaon-te-aba (lit. 'master-over-the-land'). It was Tawaia who was the first uea. Roberts published his investigation of the oral tradition on the dynasty of Abemama in 1953, after sojourning there in 1948.) He is the founder of the State of Abemama, the largest chiefdom in the 19th-century Gilbert Islands (in modern-day Kiribati). A well-known warrior, his title was recognised by the old men (unimane) in the meeting houses (maneaba), and he overcame revolts on Aranuka and at Kenna, in the south end of Abemama. The British historian H. E. Maude credits Karotu as the founder of the State of Abemama. He was succeeded by Tawaia, his firstborn son, after 1841.

== Ancestry ==
According to oral tradition, Tetabo was the founder of the utu (family) of Tuangaona, to which Karotu belonged. In the 18th century, Tetabo united Abemama against invaders from the north. For his exploits, Tetabo was titled mataniwi-iaon-te-aba (lit. 'master-over-the-land'), but he ultimately fell out of favour with the people and spent time in exile. His sons—led by Namoriki, the eldest brother—won battles on Abemama and the smaller atolls of Kuria and Aranuka, which lay to the southwest, leading to the preeminence of Tuangaona on those islands and the exaction of tribute. Karotu was the first of Namoriki's children.

== Life ==
Karotu shrewdly began acquiring land, which proved a profitable enterprise. He also gained influence as a famous warrior. In Robert Louis Stevenson's In The South Seas (1896), his great-grandson, Binoka (Tembinok'), remembers seeing Karotu (Teñkoruti) as a child. Binoka described the elderly Karotu as tall, lean, walking as if he were a young man, and – unlike every other man from his era – completely unscarred. Stevenson wrote that Karotu was both "feared and hated", and was deadly in battle. He was allegedly arrogant to the mronron (circle) of unimane (old men) that governed from the maneaba (meeting houses), which he reappropriated after becoming recognised as the uea.

By the reign of Karotu, Abemama, Kuria, and Aranuka had been sighted by Europeans. In 1821, whalers started frequenting the area. Although the I-Abemama attacked a foreign crew in 1827, they began bartering with European ships in the early 1830s. In 1835, the I-Abemama established a bêche-de-mer trading station and built curing and drying sheds on Abemama's reef.

Most information about Karotu came from oral tradition. A possible contemporary account of him came from John Kirby, the first beachcomber in his territory. Kirby deserted the Admiral Cockburn, a whaling ship, on Kuria in 1838; he was picked up by the USS Peacock of the United States Exploring Expedition in 1841. Kirby mentioned Tetalau, the king of Abemama, Kuria, and Aranuka, whose daughter Kirby said was his native wife. H. E. Maude identifies Tetelau (Tetabo) as Karotu, using his grandfather's name as a title.

Karotu consolidated his power over the three islands, forming the State of Abemama's first government. There was only one revolt. While Karotu was visiting Kuria, the village of Kenna rebelled and conquered Abemama. Forming an army from the I-Kuria and I-Aranuka, Karotu retook Abemama. The rebels fled to Kuria, terrorizing its warrior-deprived population, before leaving the State of Abemama. Most of the insurgents died at sea, but their leader reached Tabiteuea. In 1839, the islands' warriors took up arms for six months after Karotu received a warning of an imminent attack from Tabiteuea. Karotu went unopposed for the remainder of his reign.

=== Retirement ===
Karotu and his first wife had a son named Tawaia. Karotu abdicated in the 1840s in favour of Tawaia. His new wife, Teaa, later fell pregnant. Karotu and Teaa wanted the child to be the next uea. Seeing no issue with his father's wishes, Tawaia had sex with Teaa four times to establish the child's claim to succession. The child was born around 1810; he was announced as Teaa and Tawaia's son and was named Baiteke. (Note: Roberts translated Baiteke as "(to) hit things", while A Combined Kiribati-English Dictionary defines the word as "dexterity" when used as a noun, and "having a sure aim" as a verb.) R. G. Roberts wrote that Baiteke was actually Karotu's son, but Maude wrote in 1970 that it was ultimately impossible to know if Baiteke was Tawaia's son or stepbrother. Baiteke succeeded Tawaia around 1850. According to Stevenson, Karotu died around 1860, aged 70.

== Bibliography ==
- Grimble, Arthur Francis (2019) [1989]. Maude, H. E. (ed.). Tungaru Traditions. University of Hawaiʻi Press. pp. 303–333. ISBN 9780824882235.
  - Teeko, Airam (2019) [1989]. "A History of Abemama". In Maude, H. E. (ed.). Tungaru Traditions. Translated by Cowell, Reid. University of Hawaiʻi Press. pp. 334–354. ISBN 9780824882235.
- Maude, H. E. (1970). "Baiteke and Binoka of Abemama: Arbiters of change in the Gilbert Islands". In Davidson, J. W.; Scarr, Deryck (eds.). Pacific Islands Portraits. ANU Press. ISBN 0708101666.
- Roberts, R. G. (1953). "The Dynasty of Abemama". The Journal of the Polynesian Society. 62 (3). Polynesian Society: 267–278. JSTOR 20703382.
- Stevenson, R. L. (1896). In The South Seas. Scribner.
- Uriam, Kambati K. (1995). In Their Own Words: History and Society in Gilbertese Oral Tradition. The Journal of Pacific History. ISBN 0959547770.
- Wilkes, Charles (1845). Narrative of the United States Exploring Expedition. Vol. V. Lea & Blanchard.
