= Tem Baiteke =

19th-century chief in the Gilbert Islands

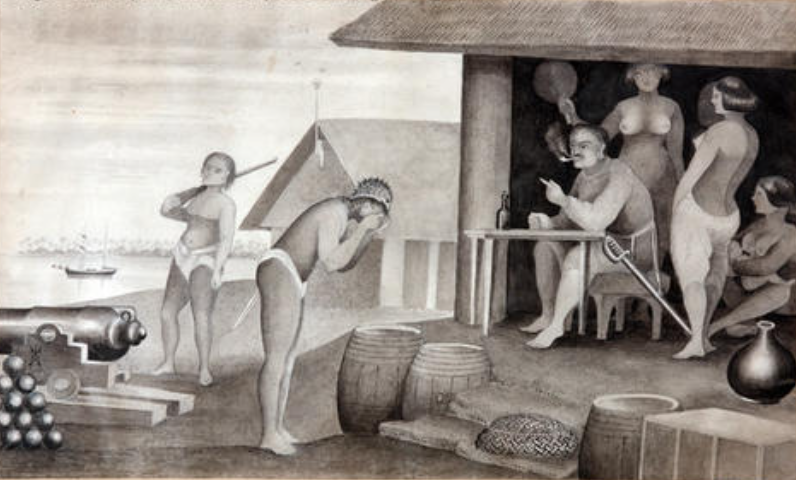
- "Tem Baiteke. King of Apemama [sic]" (Handley Bathurst Sterndale, c. 1860 – c. 1871)

Uea of Abemama, Kuria and Aranuka
- Reign: c. 1850 – 1878
- Predecessor: Tawaia
- Successor: Binoka
- Issue: Binoka; Timon; Tea; Takuaua (Note: Or Bakai.)
- Father: Karotu
- Mother: Tea

Tem Baiteke (fl. 1851–1878) was the third high chief (uea) of Abemama, Kuria and Aranuka in the Gilbert Islands (in modern-day Kiribati). He succeeded Tawaia, who reigned during the 1840s.

In 1851, Tem Baiteke had the 34 foreigners living on Abemama, Kuria and Aranuka killed. He proceeded to restrict all visiting ships to a single port on Abatiku, Abemama. On that isolated islet, Tem Baiteke could oversee everything that went in and out of his territory—including guns. In 1863, he and his warriors sailed to Kuria and Aranuka after the people of Kuria refused to send him their annual tribute of virgins. Over 1,000 people lived on each island. After the expedition, their respective populations were reduced to 100 and Tem Baiteke went unchallenged.

The despotism of the State of Abemama was unprecedented in any of the Gilbert Islands. Tem Baiteke took over the village meeting houses (maneaba), where the old men (unimane) traditionally made decisions in council, and became the sole lawmaker. He divided the people into social classes. This act centralized power through the creation of a loyal class of minor chiefs, who owned their land and status to the high chief and no one else. In 1878, Tem Baiteke abdicated in favour of Binoka, his firstborn child.

== Background ==
The State of Abemama consisted of Abemama, Kuria and Aranuka, in the Gilbert Islands.

According to oral tradition, Tetabo was the founder of the utu (family) of Tuangaona, to which Tem Baiteke belonged. In the 18th century, Tetabo united Abemama against invaders from the north. For his exploits, Tetabo was titled mataniwi-iaon-te-aba (lit. 'master-over-the-land'), but he ultimately fell out of favour with the people and spent time in exile. His sons won battles on Abemama and the smaller atolls of Kuria and Aranuka, which lay to the southwest, leading to the preeminence of Tuangaona on those islands and the exaction of tribute. His grandson, Karotu, went even further. Karotu was recognised as the first uea (high chief) of Abemama, Kuria and Aranuka, a title that was passed on to Tawaia, his son, in the 1840s. (Note: According to H. E. Maude, Karotu was recognised as the first uea (high chief) of Abemama, Kuria and Aranuka. Airam Teeko, a cousin of Bauro, said the same thing in his history of Abemama, which was a source cited by Maude. In contrast to Maude and Teeko, R. G. Roberts, who Maude also cited, wrote that Karotu was not given the title of uea but inherited the title of mataniwi-iaon-te-aba (lit. 'master-over-the-land'). It was Tawaia who was the first uea, making Baiteke the second uea and not the third. Roberts published his investigation of the oral tradition on the dynasty of Abemama in 1953, after sojourning there in 1948.) The State of Abemama was one of three stable chiefdoms in the Gilbert Islands; the others were on Butaritari–Makin and Abaiang.

Tawaia was the son of Kabubuarengana, the first wife of Karotu. After Tea—another wife of Karotu—fell pregnant, she and Tawaia had sex "on four apparently well publicised occasions". Her son was announced as the firstborn child of Tawaia. The boy's birth name has been forgotten, but in adulthood he became known as Tem Baiteke due to his sharpshooting ability. (Note: R. G. Roberts translated Baiteke as "(to) hit things", while A Combined Kiribati-English Dictionary defines the word as "dexterity" when used as a noun, and "having a sure aim" as a verb.) The period between the announcement of Tea and Tawaia having sex and the birth of Tem Baiteke was rather short, but popular gossip held that Tea's affair was longstanding. R. G. Roberts states that Karotu was the real father of Tem Baiteke, but he and Tea asked Tawaia to claim Tem Baiteke as his own son so that their child was eligible to succeed Tawaia. H. E. Maude believed it was impossible to know which was the truth. (Note: In the 1910s, Teeko stated that Baiteke was Karotu's son and made no mention of Tawaia.) After a reign that Maude described as "brief and uneventful", Tawaia died about 1850 and was succeeded by Tem Baiteke.

Tea and Karotu had another son named Binatake, who grew up to be a reputedly merciless warrior.

== Reign ==
In the 1840s, a number of beachcombers were enroaching on the island realm. The Abemamans prostituted female serfs to whalers, who started barters controlled by them rather than the uea. In the 1840s, there was an influx of whalers and merchants seeking to trade for coconut oil, including ships under Richard Randell's firm.

In January 1851, Tem Baiteke ordered all nine foreigners on Abemama killed. All 25 foreigners on Kuria and Aranuka were executed several months later.

Richard Randell, the most influential trader in the Gilbert Islands, justified the massacre to outsiders. Randell claimed that the beachcombers had made unmitigated nuisances to themselves and some had committed atrocities against locals, provoking the wrath of Tem Baiteke. Although his defense of Tem Baiteke was consistent with his broader pro-Gilbertese stance, H. E. Maude pointed out that after the massacres Richard Randell effectively held a monopoly on trade with Abemama, Kuria and Aranuka. Brief notices of the massacres on Abemama, Kuria and Aranuka appeared in the few periodicals interested in news from the Gilberts, but there were no calls for European retribution.

Afterwards, Tem Baiteke restricted all visiting ships to a single port on Abatiku, an isolated islet of Abemama. On Abatiku, he could oversee everything that went in and out of his territory—including guns.

=== Society ===
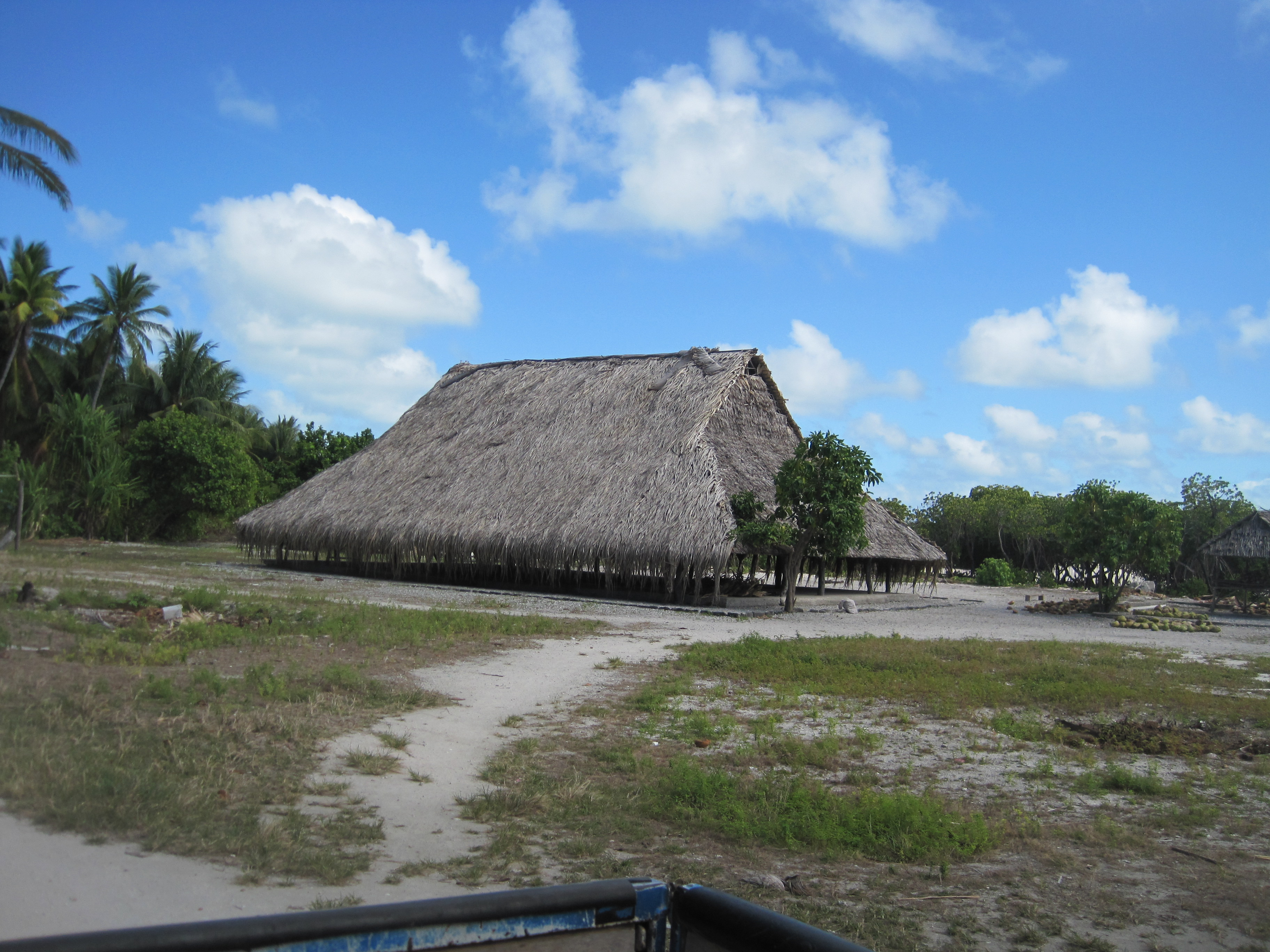
A traditional maneaba (meeting house) on Abemama

According to H. E. Maude, the despotic power that Tem Baiteke held was unprecedented in the Gilbert Islands. Traditionally, each village was governed through their respective maneaba (meeting house), where the old men (unimane) gathered in an informal council, making decisions and arbitrating local disputes.

Tem Baiteke divided the people into hereditary social classes. According to H. E. Maude, the social stratification of Abemama, Kuria and Aranuka represented a "social revolution", replacing "a slave-owning but otherwise democratic and egalitarian community" with a feudal society. He suggested that the social hierarchy was based on that of Butaritari–Makin, where a dynasty of uea had ruled since legendary times.

The ba n uea (family of the uea), headed by the uea and his eldest son, was at the apex of the social hierarchy. The toka or inaomata were minor chiefs drawn mainly from the ranks of the unimane and selected for their prior service to the uea, or because they were related to him or his wives. The toka subsumed the functions of the unimane in the maneaba, and Tem Baiteke chose some to serve on his supreme council. The creation of this class, who owed their land and status to the uea alone, centralized power and ensured that Tem Baiteke had loyalists he could rely on to help him govern. The aomata were also a landed class, but they were less wealthy and distinguished than the inaomata.

The last two classes did not own land. The rang had to work the land of others to make a living, but were not enslaved and could choose who they worked for. Enslaved people were known as toro or kaunga. In 1972, some unimane disagreed on whether or not the rang and toro classes should be distinguished.

=== Rebellions ===
In 1863, the people of Kuria refused to send Tem Baiteke their annual tribute of virgins. In response, Tem Baiteke organized a punitive expedition to Kuria led by Binatake. According to Charles Morris Woodford, the ship that carried Tem Baiteke, Binatake and their warriors was owned by Smith, Randell, and Fairclough.

The rebels—who had a few guns and some powder, but no shot—were mainly relying on the spells of their chief priest, Tenu. After Tenu was killed by a shot fired from the ship, the rebels fled in canoes.

Over 1,000 people lived on each island. After the expedition, their respective populations were reduced to 100 and Tem Baiteke went unchallenged.

== Legacy ==
In late 1878, Tem Baiteke abdicated in favour of his eldest son, Binoka.

== Bibliography ==
- Maude, H. E. (1970). "Baiteke and Binoka of Abemama: Arbiters of change in the Gilbert Islands". In Davidson, J. W.; Scarr, Deryck (eds.). Pacific Islands Portraits. Canberra: ANU Press. ISBN 0708101666.
- Garrett, John (1982). To Live Among the Stars: Christian Origins in Oceania. Geneva : Suva: World Council of Churches. ISBN 978-2-8254-0692-2.
- Grimble, Arthur Francis (2019) [1989]. Maude, H. E. (ed.). Tungaru Traditions. University of Hawaiʻi Press. pp. 303–333. ISBN 9780824882235.
  - Teeko, Airam (2019) [1989]. "A History of Abemama". In Maude, H. E. (ed.). Tungaru Traditions. Translated by Cowell, Reid. University of Hawaiʻi Press. pp. 334–354. ISBN 9780824882235.
- Pateman, May, ed. (1942). Aia Karaki nikawai I-Tungaru [Myths and Legends of the Gilbertese People] (PDF) (in Gilbertese). London Missionary Society.
- Roberts, R. G. (1953). "The Dynasty of Abemama". The Journal of the Polynesian Society. 62 (3). Polynesian Society: 267–278. JSTOR 20703382.
- Uriam, Kambati K. (1995). In Their Own Words: History and Society in Gilbertese Oral Tradition. Australian National University: The Journal of Pacific History. ISBN 0959547770.
