= Ten Tawaia =

Chief in the Gilbert Islands (died c.1850)

Uea of Abemama, Kuria and Aranuka
- Reign: c. 1841 – c. 1850
- Predecessor: Karotu
- Successor: Baiteke
- Died: c. 1850
- Father: Karotu

Ten Tawaia (died c. 1850) was the second high chief (uea) of Abemama, Kuria and Aranuka, in the Gilbert Islands (in modern-day Kiribati). Ten Tawaia was the first son of Karotu, the founder and first high chief of the State of Abemama, by his first wife. His reign was brief and uneventful. After his death, he was succeeded by Baiteke. Baiteke was the child of Tea, the second wife of Karotu; he was rumoured to be the product of Tea's affair with Ten Tawaia. However, Baiteke was probably the son of Karotu and Tea. Karotu and Tea probably asked Ten Tawaia to claim Baiteke as his own so that Baiteke could succeed Ten Tawaia as high chief.

== Background ==
According to oral tradition, Tetabo was the founder of the utu (family) of Tuangaona, to which Ten Tawaia belonged. In the 18th century, Tetabo united Abemama against invaders from the north. For his exploits, Tetabo was titled mataniwi-iaon-te-aba (lit. 'master-over-the-land'), but he ultimately fell out of favour with the people and spent time in exile. His sons won battles on Abemama and the smaller atolls of Kuria and Aranuka, which lay to the southwest, leading to the preeminence of Tuangaona on those islands and the exaction of tribute. His grandson, Karotu, went even further. He was recognised as the first uea (high chief) of Abemama, Kuria and Aranuka. (Note: According to H. E. Maude, Karotu was recognised as the first uea (high chief) of Abemama, Kuria and Aranuka. Airam Teeko, a cousin of Bauro, said the same thing in his history of Abemama, which was a source cited by Maude. In contrast to Maude and Teeko, R. G. Roberts, who Maude also cited, wrote that Karotu was not given the title of uea but inherited the title of mataniwi-iaon-te-aba (lit. 'master-over-the-land'), and named his son, Tawaia, the first uea. Roberts published his investigation of the oral tradition on the dynasty of Abemama in 1953, after sojourning there in 1948.)

Ten Tawaia was the firstborn child of Karotu. His mother, Kabubuarengana, was the first wife of Karotu; Karotu's other wives were named Tereaua and Tea. He had two younger brothers, Baiteke and Binatake.

== Reign ==
Ten Tawaia was the uea (high chief) of Abemama, Kuria and Aranuka.

It was the custom for aging chiefs to abdicate in favour of their sons. Having overcome all opposition, Karotu abdicated the chieftainship in the 1840s, sometime after 1841. (Note: In 1841, the United States Exploring Expedition's USS Peacock picked up John Kirby, a beachcomber, from Kuria. Kirby mentioned that the king of Abemama, Kuria and Aranuka, who he called "Tetalau". H. E. Maude identifies Tetalau as Karotu using the name of his grandfather, Tetabo, a "not uncommon" practice seen in some chiefly families.) He likely remained a strong influence on Ten Tawaia. The latter half of the decade was marked by a rapid escalation of the coconut oil trade in the Gilberts. Beachcombers, having risen in numbers on Abemama, Kuria and Aranuka, bartered with the locals outside the purview of their high chief. Many of them were agents obtaining coconut oil for merchants such as Richard Randell. Uncontrolled trade had the potential to undermine the high chief's position, giving the people access to new resources and changing their way of life. At the time, the high chief was yet to claim control over all of the islands' resources.

After Tea—another wife of Karotu—fell pregnant, she and Ten Tawaia had sex "on four apparently well publicised occasions". Her son was announced as the firstborn child of Ten Tawaia. The boy, whose birth name has been forgotten, became known as Baiteke in adulthood. The period between the announcement of Tea and Ten Tawaia having sex and the birth of Baiteke was rather short, but popular gossip held that Tea's affair was longstanding. R. G. Roberts states that Karotu was the real father of Baiteke, but he and Tea asked Ten Tawaia to claim Baiteke as his own son so that their child was eligible to succeed Ten Tawaia. H. E. Maude believed it was impossible to know which was the truth. (Note: In the 1910s, Teeko stated that Baiteke was Karotu's son and made no mention of Tawaia.) After a reign that Maude described as "brief and uneventful", Ten Tawaia died about 1850 and was succeeded by Baiteke.

== Ancestry ==
Ancestors of Ten Tawaia

Ten Tetabo
Ten Namoriki
Teng Karotu
Ten Tawaia
Nei Kabubuarengana
