= Binoka =

Gilbertese high chief (d. after 1912)

Tem Binoka
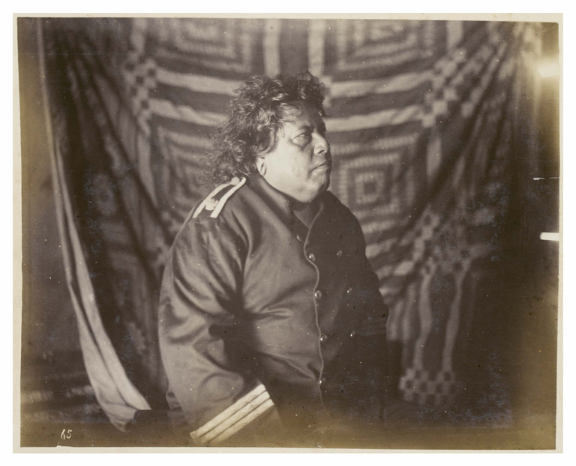
- "HM King Tembenoka of Apemama, Kuria, Arimaka" [sic] (Robert Louis Stevenson, 1892)

Uea of Abemama, Kuria and Aranuka
- Reign: 1878–1891
- Predecessor: Baiteke
- Successor: Bauro
- Born: c. 1840
- Died: 10 November 1891
- Father: Baiteke

Tem Binoka (c. 1840 – 10 November 1891) was the fourth uea (king) of Abemama, Kuria and Aranuka in the Gilbert Islands from 1878 until his death.

Tem Binoka was the first son and successor of Tem Baiteke, whose innovations in the State of Abemama, such as his personal oversight of border and gun control, gave him power unprecedented in the Gilbert Islands. Like his father, Tem Binoka was an autocrat but it is hard to determine how exaggerated the stories of despotism are. As king, one of his earliest actions was to monopolise the trade of copra to Europeans. Copra was the most valuable commodity in the Gilbert Islands, and Abemama its largest producer.

Until 1884, Tem Binoka owned several stores and merchant ships, but he could not compete with the foreign firms. With ambitions of conquering the entire archipelago, Tem Binoka occupied Nonouti in December 1883. However, the warship HMS Dart expelled his garrison the month after. As a result, Tem Binoka led a placid life after defeating the last recorded rebellion against him in 1885.

Robert Louis Stevenson visited Abemama in 1889 and befriended Tem Binoka. He was portrayed in Stevenson's In The South Seas (1896), although his name was spelled Tembinok', as a sympathetic despot who represented a bygone era before European contact. Less than a year after Tem Binoka's death, the British annexed the Gilberts.

== Background ==
=== Origins ===
Binoka was the high chief (uea) of Abemama, Kuria and Aranuka. Tebanga was the formal capital of his dynasty, but Binoinano was the location of his palace.

According to oral tradition, Tetabo was the founder of the utu (family) of Tuangaona, to which Binoka belonged. In the 18th century, Tetabo united Abemama against invaders from the north. For his exploits, Tetabo was titled mataniwi-iaon-te-aba (lit. 'master-over-the-land'), but he ultimately fell out of favour with the people and spent time in exile. His sons won battles on Abemama and the smaller atolls of Kuria and Aranuka, which lay to the southwest, leading to the preeminence of Tuangaona on those islands and the exaction of tribute. His grandson, Karotu, went even further. Karotu was recognised as the first uea (high chief) of Abemama, Kuria and Aranuka, a title that was passed on to Tawaia, his son. (Note: According to H. E. Maude, Karotu was recognised as the first uea (high chief) of Abemama, Kuria and Aranuka. Airam Teeko, a cousin of Bauro, said the same thing in his history of Abemama, which was a source cited by Maude. Karotu was followed by Tewaia and Baiteke. In contrast to Maude and Teeko, R. G. Roberts, who Maude also cited, wrote that Karotu was not given the title of uea but inherited the title of mataniwi-iaon-te-aba (lit. 'master-over-the-land'). It was Tewaia who was the first uea, making Binoka the third uea and not the fourth. Roberts published his investigation of the oral tradition on the dynasty of Abemama in 1953, after sojourning there in 1948.) After a brief and uneventful reign, Tawaia was succeeded by Baiteke, who was either his son or Karotu's.

=== Baiteke ===
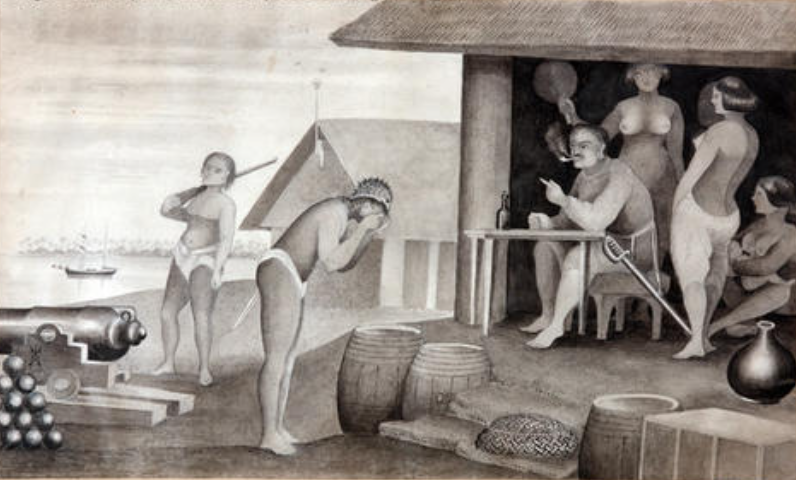
"Tem Baiteke, King of Apemama [sic]" (Handley Bathurst Sterndale, c. 1860 – c. 1871)

Beachcombers began to arrive in the chiefdom in 1838. The people began to barter with them and with passing ships outside the purview of the uea. During the 1840s, the number of visiting ships exploded with the rise of the coconut oil trade. In 1851, the recently inaugurated Baiteke executed every beachcomber on Abemama, Kuria and Aranuka. Visiting ships were subsequently restricted to the isolated islet of Abatiku, where Baiteke could oversee trade and control the flow of resources in and out of his territory. He now controlled the import of firearms, and was able to put down revolts with ease. To consolidate power, Baiteke divided his people into social classes, with the banuea (family of the uea) at the top of the hierarchy. He supplanted the traditional authorities who had elected Karotu, the unimane (old men) who made communal decisions on behalf of their villages in the maneaba (meeting houses).

== Early life ==
Binoka was born c. 1840. He was the firstborn child of Baiteke. Little is known of his mother; (Note: His mother's name has been genealogically recorded as Nei Katamã, or Kantake.) he had a brother, Timon, and at least one sister, Teaa. (Note: Genealogies also record other female siblings, such as Nei Bakai and Nei Takuaua.) Binoka was raised by the consorts and favourites of his father. Unlike Baiteke, Binoka grew up in privilege, segregated from the lower classes, and he did not learn the self-discipline and militant spirit of his ancestors. Binoka and Karotu lived briefly at the same time, as Binoka recalled seeing his battle-scarred ancestor as a boy.

In 1873, Baiteke allowed Hiram Bingham, a Christian missionary, to send a mission teacher to Abemama. However, Bingham found that Baiteke strictly reserved education for his son. Binoka held the inexperienced teacher, the ill-mannered Moses Kanoaro, in contempt, but learned basic arithmetic and geography and how to read and write Gilbertese. Binoka also convinced his father to employ a German to build Abemama's first stone house.

Binoka served as the deputy of his father in visiting ships.

== Reign ==
=== Robert Louis Stevenson's account of Binoka ===
Recreation of Binoka's flag. He was forced to remove one of the stars after the British seized Nonouti

Binoka was the last truly independent and influential king of parts of the Gilbert Islands, at a time when the Gilberts were being increasingly influenced by white settlers and traders. Binoka resided on Abemama, and, unlike the rulers of neighbouring islands, did not allow outsiders to establish a permanent presence there. Binoka controlled access to the atolls under his control and jealously guarded his revenue and his prerogatives as monarch. He briefly accepted the presence on Abemama of Tuppoti, a Christian missionary, then deported him for attempting to set up a copra trading business.

In 1888, he granted Robert Louis Stevenson, Fanny Vandegrift Stevenson and Lloyd Osbourne the right to live temporarily on Abemama, on the condition that they did not give or sell money, liquor or tobacco to his subjects. They returned to Abemama in July 1890 during their cruise on the trading steamer the Janet Nicoll.

Binoka was immortalised by Robert Louis Stevenson's description of him in his book In the South Seas. Stevenson spent two months on Abemama in 1889. Stevenson described Binoka as the "one great personage in the Gilberts … and the last tyrant". Stevenson described the ambitions of Binoka as an embryonic "empire of the archipelago" and established his importance in the Gilbert Islands as "Binoka figures in the patriotic war-songs of the Gilberts like Napoleon in those of our grandfathers."

Stevenson describes Binoka, in years before his visit, as attempting to extend his rule over a number of islands and atolls; he compelled Maiana to pay tribute, and seized Nonouti, before being driven out by a British warship and being forbidden to expand his kingdom further. Stevenson does not date these events. At this time Royal Navy ships served on the Australia Station, and operated in the South Pacific.

=== Binoka—the merchant king ===
Binoka owned trade ships which would travel to Australia and New Zealand. His commercial ventures, however, ended in failure with the loss of his ship the Coronet.

THERE is one great personage in the Gilberts: Tembinok' of Apemama: solely conspicuous, the hero of song, the butt of gossip. Through the rest of the group the kings are slain or fallen in tutelage: Tembinok' alone remains, the last tyrant, the last erect vestige of a dead society. The white man is everywhere else, building his houses, drinking his gin, getting in and out of trouble with the weak native governments. [He] figures in the patriotic war-songs of the Gilberts like Napoleon in those of our grandfathers.

— Robert Louis Stevenson, In The South Seas (1896), p. 329–330

He found a Scotsman, George McGhee Murdoch, who organized production and marketing on Binoka's several thousand acres of heritable land. Murdoch also maintained good relationships with the New Bedford whalers who used Abemama as a base, and he persuaded Binoka to allow Stevenson's party to settle ashore. George Murdoch did not reveal Binoka’s murderous habits to Stephenson - Binoka would shoot his own subjects down from tree-tops for the amusement of watching them fall sprawling - and Stevenson did not name Murdoch in his book.

Binoka was also a merchant king, controlling his kingdom's commerce. He enforced the allocation of produce; such that the taro went to the chiefs of each village to allocate among their various subjects; certain fish and turtles and the whole of the produce of the coco-palm, the source of copra belonged to Binoka. He would trade the copra with visiting trading ships. He was, according to Stevenson:

greedy of things new and foreign. House after house, chest after chest, in the palace precinct, is already crammed with clocks, musical boxes, blue spectacles, umbrellas, knitted waistcoats, bolts of stuff, tools, rifles, fowling-pieces, medicines, European foods, sewing-machines, and, what is more extraordinary, stoves.

While the captains and supercargos of trading ships could expect to sell such novelties at a great profit, Binoka controlled access to his islands and would refuse to deal with those whom he considered to take advantage of him. Stevenson describes Binoka as classing captains and supercargoes in three categories: "He cheat a little"—"He cheat plenty"—and "I think he cheat too much”.

Binoka gave his many wives a share of the copra, which they would use to trade for hats, ribbons, dresses and other produce available on the trading ships. However sticks of tobacco were the main product they purchased, which Stevenson described as being "island currency, tantamount to minted gold". Stevenson described a notable feature of life with Binoka as being that evenings were spent with Binoka playing card games with his wives with the currency being tobacco sticks. He had developed his own version of poker in which he could play either of two hands dealt to him. By this strategy Binoka would win most of the tobacco, so that Binoka ended up with effective control of the tobacco, which he would allocate to his wives and other subjects, so that he was, as described by Stevenson "the sole fount of all indulgences".

While Stevenson refers to Binoka as "the last tyrant", Stevenson's account of his time with Binoka is much more sympathetic that given to Bureimoa, the ruler of Butaritari and Makin atolls in the Gilbert Islands. Bureimoa allowed two San Francisco trading firms to operate, Messrs. Crawford and Messrs. Wightman Brothers, with up to 12 Europeans resident on various of the atolls. The presence of the Europeans, and the alcohol they traded to the islanders, resulted in periodic alcoholic binges that only ended with Nakaeia making tapu (forbidding) the sale of alcohol. During the 15 or so days Stevenson spent on Butaritari the islanders were engaged in a drunken spree that threatened the safety of Stevenson and his family. Stevenson adopted the strategy of describing himself as the son of Queen Victoria so as to ensure that he would be treated as a person who should not be threatened or harmed.

In 1876 Britain and Germany agreed to divide up their interests in the western and central Pacific, with each claiming a 'sphere of influence'. In 1877 the Governor of Fiji was given the additional title of High Commissioner for the Western Pacific. The British 'sphere of influence' included the Ellice Islands and the Gilbert Islands, but it made little difference to the governance of these islands until after Binoka's death.

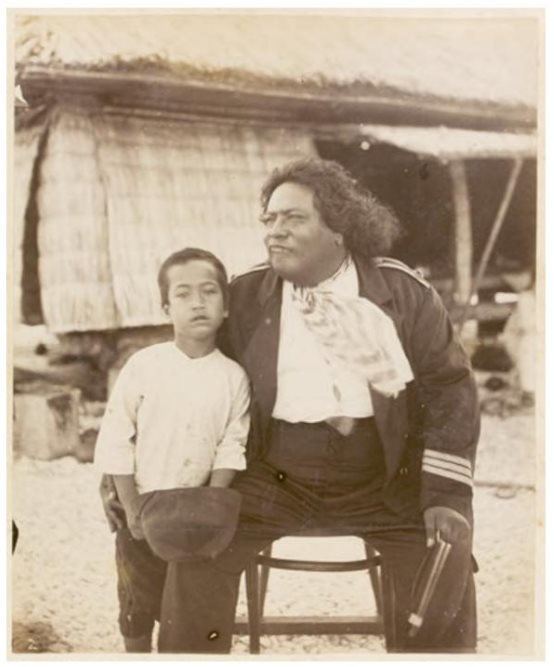
"King of Apemama [sic] and his son Bauro" (Robert Louis Stevenson, 1882)

Murdoch is reported as saying that "I ordered myself a belt with a big crown on the buckle, and I stuck another crown in front of my helmet. Solid silver, they were. I told him the Queen herself had sent them to me for a present. Whenever a new law came out, I invented a special message from the Queen requesting his pairsonal collaboration in the matter. He was impressed and pleased. I made a by-ordinary good citizen of the old reprobate before he died."

Binoka died from an infected abscess on 10 November 1891. In 2014, Don, a descendant of Binoka, said that he died of syphilis, brought to Abemama by the whalers. He was succeeded as uea by his adopted son, Bauro. Timon acted as regent until Bauro came of age and reigned briefly and uneventfully.

The year after Binoka's death, Captain Edward Davis moored at Abemama to proclaim the Gilbert Islands a British protectorate. Murdoch became the District Agent and Tax Collector, setting up local courts and administration that brought peace and order to the lagoon villages and controlled (often with strong measures) the European beachcombers; he retired as a Resident Commissioner in 1912.

== Ancestry ==
Ancestors of Binoka

Tetabo
Namoriki
Beiarung
Karotu
Baiteke
Tea
Binoka

== Bibliography ==
- Crowley, Terry (1990). "King Binoka of Abemama and the Pacific Pidgin lineage" (PDF). Te Reo. 33 (1900). Linguistic Society of New Zealand: 25–42.
- Macdonald, P. D. (2016). "The Would-Be Empire Builder".
- Maude, H. E. (1970). "Baiteke and Binoka of Abemama: Arbiters of change in the Gilbert Islands". In Davidson, J. W.; Scarr, Deryck (eds.). Pacific Islands Portraits. Canberra: ANU Press. ISBN 0708101666.
- Roberts, R. G. (1953). "The Dynasty of Abemama". The Journal of the Polynesian Society. 62 (3). Polynesian Society: 267–278. JSTOR 20703382.
- Stevenson, Fanny (2016) [1914]. The Cruise of the Janet Nichol among the South Sea Islands – via Project Gutenberg.
- Stevenson, Robert Louis (1896). In the South Seas. Scribner.
- Teeko, Airam (2019) [1989]. "A History of Abemama". In Maude, H. E. (ed.). Tungaru Traditions. Translated by Cowell, Reid. University of Hawaiʻi Press. pp. 334–354. ISBN 9780824882235.
- Uriam, Kambati K. (1995). In Their Own Words: History and Society in Gilbertese Oral Tradition. Australian National University: The Journal of Pacific History. ISBN 0959547770.
- Watters, Ray; Banibati, Kabiritaake (1984) [1977]. Abemama. Atoll Economy: Social Change in Kiribati and Tuvalu. no. 5. ANU Press. ISBN 978-0-86784-401-6.
