= Thomas Gilbert (sea captain) =

British sea captain

Thomas Gilbert was a British sea captain. The Republic of Kiribati and the constituent Gilbert Islands are named after him.

== Life ==
Thomas Gilbert and John Marshall were the captains of two East India Company vessels of the First Fleet, the Charlotte and the Scarborough, returning from carrying convicts to Botany Bay in 1788, when they sailed through the Gilbert Islands and described Aranuka, Kuria, Abaiang and Tarawa.

The vessels had been part of the First Fleet carrying convicts to Australia. They had sailed in a convoy under the command of post-captain Arthur Phillip, New South Wales' first Governor.

The two vessels encountered their first island in the Gilberts on 17 June 1788. In a 1944 article in Life Samuel Eliot Morison wrote that this Island was told to be Abemama, but might have been Aranuka. Gilbert visited Tarawa on 20 June 1788. Sketches he made survive.

== Legacy ==
The First, Second and Third Thomas Shoals in the Spratly Islands are named after Gilbert. They, along with the Scarborough shoal, were discovered during the Scarborough's voyages through the South China Sea.

The modern country of Kiribati and its national language are also named after Gilbert, "Kiribati" being the pronunciation of his surname in the nation's indigenous language of Gilbertese.

== Media ==
A character called Captain Paul Gilbert is portrayed by James Mason in the 1953 film Botany Bay.
