= Uea (title) =

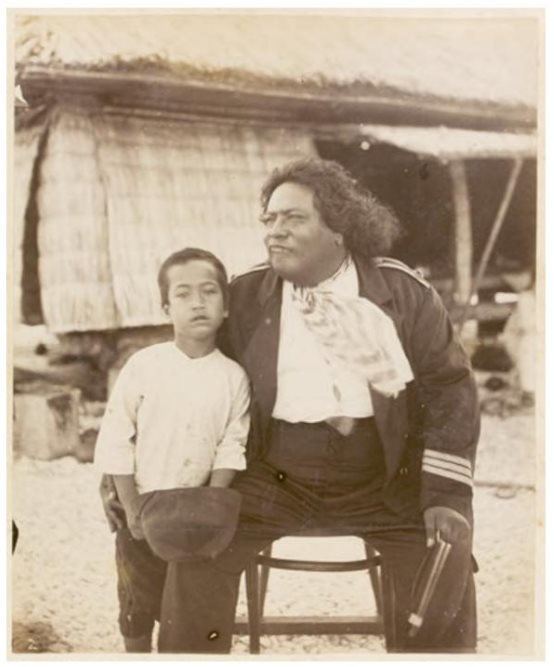
Binoka, uea of Abemama, Kuria and Aranuka, pictured with his heir, Bauro, by Robert Louis Stevenson in 1889

In the Gilbertese language, an uea is a king, high chief, lord or sovereign. An uea aine (lit. 'female uea') is a queen. During the pre-colonial and early colonial era, the Gilbertese people had two forms of native government: chiefdoms, headed by uea; and the maneaba (meeting house), where the uea was merely the speaker of the maneaba.

On the northern islands, there was social stratification with the uea at the top of the hierarchy. According to H. E. Maude, there are only four stable dynasties of uea recorded: the ancient kings of Tarawa; the chieftainship of Butaritari and Makin, which was abolished in 1963; the 19th-century chiefs of Abaiang, who rose to power with missionary Hiram Bingham Jr.'s support; and the dynasty of Abemama, Kuria and Aranuka.

In the south, a council of unimane (old men) presided over the maneaba (meeting house) in each village. The unimane made decisions on behalf of the community and arbitrated disputes. The speaker of the maneaba was also known as the uea, and was usually drawn from the boti (clan) of Karongoa n Uea, which was descended from Samoan immigrants who introduced the maneaba to the Gilbertese. Accorded great reverence and many privileges, these uea were nevertheless not autocrats or warlords like some of the uea in the north.

According to oral tradition, Kaitu and Uakeia led a fleet of warriors from Beru and conquered most of the Gilbert Islands. They displaced the old chiefly system with the maneaba-based system. In the south, they were successful in eradicating chiefs (the name of Tabiteuea literally means that uea are taboo) while the north adopted a mixture of the two systems.

== History ==
The Gilbert Islands were annexed into the British Empire in 1892, leading to the decline of the power of high chiefs (uea) in favour of magistrates. By 1907, the office of high chief was reported to be abolished in the British-backed Native Governments where it had been present. However, the high chiefs retained some authority in a customary context, and chiefly families remained influential, both working and competing with the Native Governments.

== Bibliography ==
- Macdonald, Barrie (1982). Cinderellas of the Empire: Towards a History of Kiribati and Tuvalu. Canberra: Australian National University Press. ISBN 978-0-70811-616-6.
- Maude, H. E. (1963). "Memoir No. 35. The Evolution of the Gilbertese BOTI. An Ethnohistorical Interpretation". The Journal of the Polynesian Society. 72 (1): 3–68. ISSN 0032-4000.
- Roberts, R. G. (1953). "The Dynasty of Abemama". The Journal of the Polynesian Society. 62 (3). Polynesian Society: 267–278. JSTOR 20703382.
