= Alan Ward (historian) =

New Zealand historian (1935–2014)

Alan Ward ONZM
- Born: Alan Dudley Ward; 11 June 1935; Gisborne, New Zealand
- Died: 12 December 2014 (aged 79); Newcastle, New South Wales, Australia
- Education: Victoria University College; Australian National University
- Known for: Customary land tenure and land reform in the South Pacific
- Scientific career
- Fields: South Pacific history
- Workplaces: La Trobe University; University of Papua New Guinea; University of Newcastle
- Thesis: Towards one New Zealand: the government and the Maori people, 1861–93 (1967)
- Doctoral advisor: J.W. Davidson

Alan Dudley Ward ONZM (11 June 1935 – 12 December 2014) was a New Zealand historian, particularly known for his research into customary land tenure by Māori in New Zealand.

== Biography ==
Born in Gisborne, New Zealand in 1935, Ward was raised in rural Poverty Bay. Initially intending to be a school teacher, Ward attended Victoria University College and Auckland Teachers' College, but he was drawn to the subject of history and graduated Master of Arts with first-class honours from Victoria in 1958. His thesis was entitled The history of the East Coast Maori Trust.

Ward then spent a short period teaching, a year training for the Anglican priesthood, 10 months working in the New Zealand Department of External Affairs, and a time working on the wharves. In 1962 he began doctoral studies at the Australian National University (ANU) on the topic of Anglican missionaries in the Solomon Islands, but he did not settle and subsequently returned to New Zealand where he taught at Mount Roskill Grammar School in Auckland. However, he returned to ANU in 1965, completing a PhD under J.W. Davidson in 1967. His thesis, entitled Towards one New Zealand: the government and the Maori people, 1861–93, became the book A show of justice: racial 'amalgamation' in nineteenth century New Zealand, which has been described as an "extraordinarily influential" piece of work.

In 1967, Ward was appointed as a lecturer at La Trobe University in Melbourne, and taught there until 1987, rising to the rank of reader. During this time he also lectured in history at the University of Papua New Guinea in 1971, was a consultant to a commission of inquiry into land matters in Papua New Guinea in 1973, and from 1981 to 1982 was Director of Rural Lands in Vanuatu. From 1987 to 1996, Ward was professor of history at the University of Newcastle. He was subsequently awarded the title of professor emeritus. For 18 years from 1987 he was a contract historian to the Waitangi Tribunal.

Ward died in Newcastle, Australia in 2014.

== Honours ==
In the 2009 New Year Honours, Ward was appointed an Officer of the New Zealand Order of Merit for services to New Zealand history. Also in 2009 he was awarded an honorary Doctor of Laws degree by Victoria University of Wellington.

== Selected works ==
- Ward, Alan (1974). A show of justice: racial 'amalgamation' in nineteenth century New Zealand. Auckland: Auckland University Press. ISBN 0196479746.
- Ward, Alan (1999). An unsettled history: Treaty claims in New Zealand today. Wellington: Bridget Williams. ISBN 0908912978.
