= State of Abemama =

Chiefdom in the Gilbert Islands (1795–1892)

- c. 1840–1892
- Flag (1889–1892)

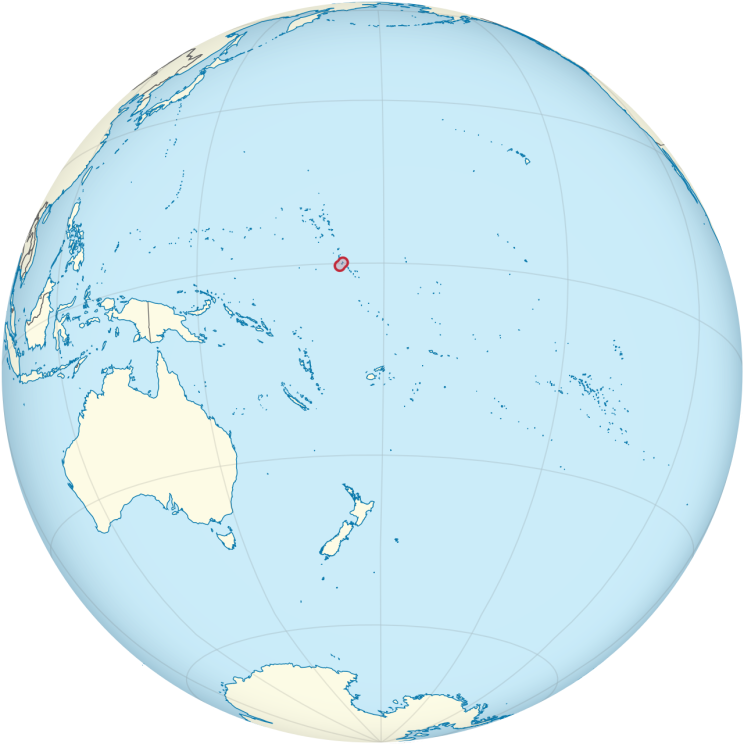
- Capital: Binoinano, Abemama
- Government: Chiefdom
- Uea
  - c. 1840 – c. 1850: Tewaia
  - c. 1850 – 1878: Baiteke
  - 1878–1891: Binoka
  - 1891–1892: Bauro
- History
  - Established: c. 1840
  - Disestablished: 1892
Succeeded by
Gilbert Islands
- Today part of: Kiribati

The State of Abemama was a chiefdom in the Gilbert Islands during the 19th century. The state consisted of the islands of Abemama, Kuria and Aranuka. A high chief (uea), who inherited the position patrilineally, reigned over the three atolls.

In the late 18th century, Tuangaona, a family of warriors from Abemama, made Abemama, Kuria and Aranuka its tributaries. Karotu laid the foundations for a unified state by consolidating his power over the three atolls. In the 1840s, his son, Tewaia, became the first in a line of hereditary monarchs known as uea in Gilbertese and kings or high chiefs in English. From 1850 to 1891, the high chiefs Baiteke and Binoka transformed the State of Abemama into a stratified, centralized autocracy. They stymied European influence by closing their borders and controlling all trade in and out of their territory. Baiteke and Binoka became infamous in the Gilberts, and the latter appeared in Robert Louis Stevenson's In The South Seas (1896) after he hosted the novelist on Abemama. The British annexed the Gilbert Islands in 1892, a year after Binoka died, bringing an end to the State of Abemama.

== History ==
=== Background ===
Tuangaona is an utu (clan) of Abemama. It is named for the birthplace of its legendary patriarch, Tetabo, a powerful aintoa (giant) who was the first warrior to unite Abemama. Everything about him is drawn from oral tradition; the Gilbertese did not have writing before European contact. Tetabo was the grandson of Mwea, an I-Beru warrior who settled on Abemama before the wars of Kaitu and Uekaia. Tetabo married Beiarung – the great-granddaughter of I-Butaritari nobleman Mangkia, who migrated during the wars – uniting the two most prominent families on Abemama.

Although he earned the gratitude of the I-Abemama for defeating an I-Tarawa raiding party, Tetabo was later exiled because of his propensity for war. In his final years, Tetabo quietly returned to his lands. However, his sons took control of Abemama with their victories at Terianiboti and Kaeaki. Led by Tetabo's eldest son, Namoriki, Tuangaona conquered the neighboring islands of Kuria and Aranuka.

=== Early years ===
Karotu, the son of Namoriki, was the first member of Tuangaona to consolidate their power and be recognized as uea (king). He established the polity Europeans referred to as the State of Abemama, or the Kingdom of Abemama.

In 1882, contact with the British was made, most notably Robert Louis Stevenson, who was a friend of Binoka. Shortly after this interaction, Abemama gave up its sovereignty and was declared as part of the Gilbert and Ellice Islands Protectorate. British control over the atoll was only in name, as Abemama kept its traditional monarchy as its high chief, like many other atolls in the region.

Before Binoka ascended to the throne of the kingdom, the population of Abemama and the surrounding atolls were far greater than what they are today. However, due to Binoka's "extreme cruelty", the population was greatly reduced.

As Binoka grew older, he realised he would not have a son of his own. Therefore, he adopted Bauro. At the adoption ceremony, the feet of the child were cut in order to release the Rang or labor class blood. Shortly after Bauro was adopted, Binoka died, and his brother Timon acted as a regent for the young Bauro. Once Bauro was on the throne, he reigned over an uneventful period.

Once Bauro died, his son Tekinaiti was the heir, and served as king until 1944, when a minority movement began in Abemama to have him renounce his position in favor of Taburimai. The reason behind the movement was that Tekinaiti failed to interest himself in the welfare of his subjects and had acted in a manner that did not command respect.

== See also ==
- Gilbert and Ellice Islands
