= Oneeke =

Smaller island of the Kuria atoll

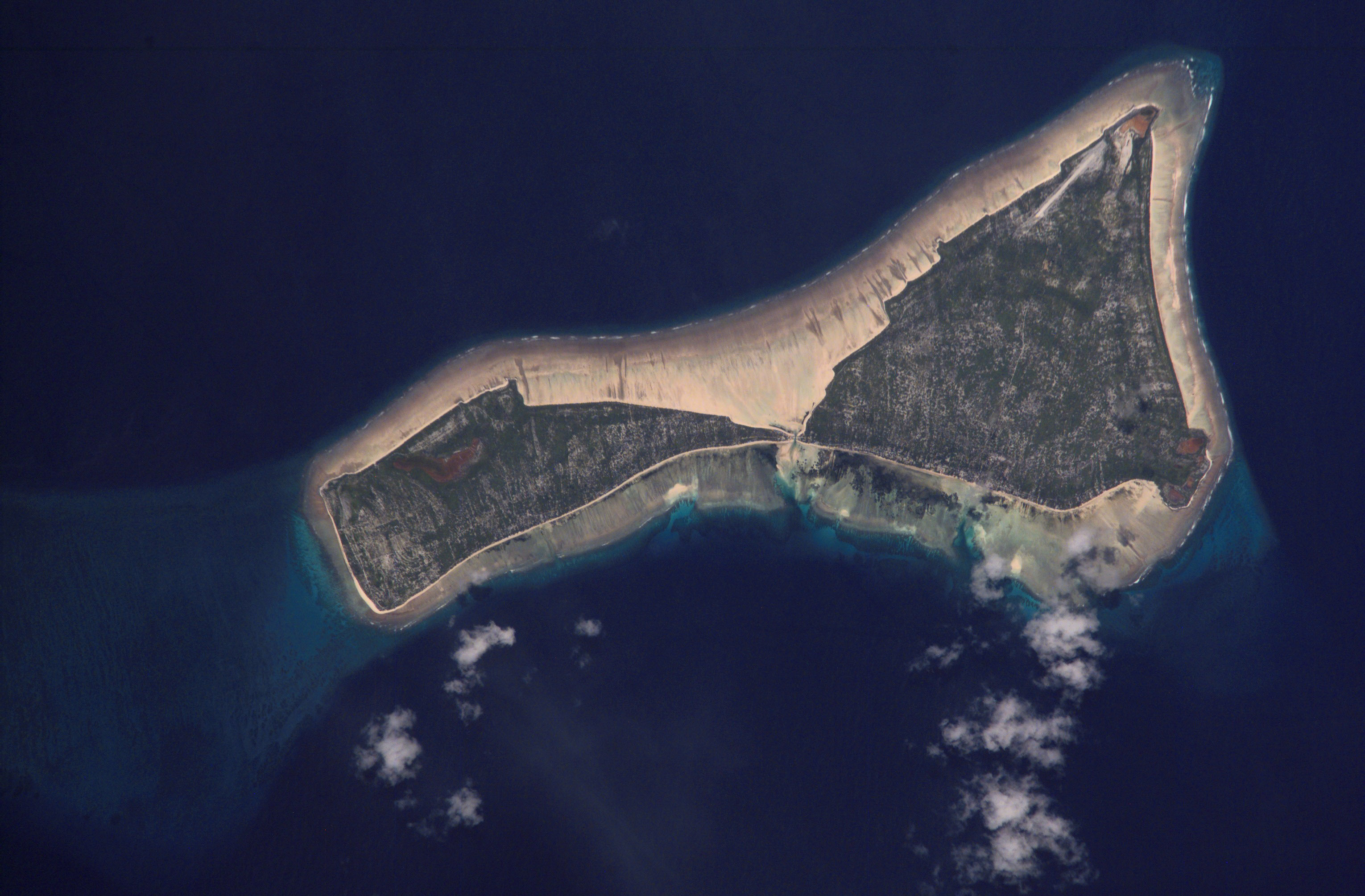
- Oneeke is the Island on the left

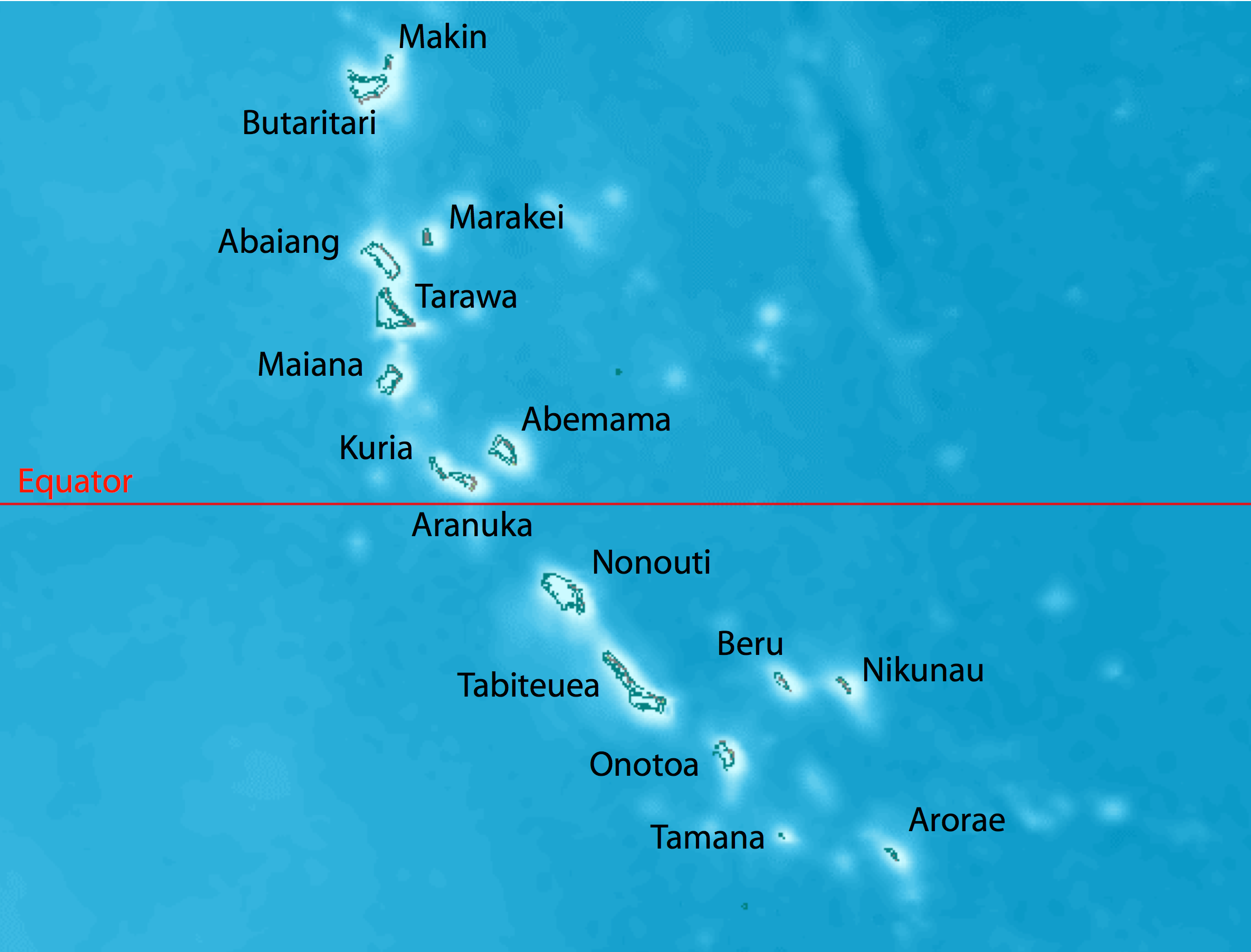

Geography
- Location: Pacific Ocean
- Coordinates: 0°13′N 173°24′E
- Archipelago: Gilbert Islands
- Highest elevation: 3 m (10 ft)

Administration
- Kiribati

Oneeke (also Oneaka) is the smaller of the two islands which form Kuria in the North Gilbert Islands. It is separated from Buariki, the larger island, by a narrow channel. A fringing reef extends from the island.
