= USS Peacock =

USS Peacock may refer to the following ships of the United States Navy:

- USS Peacock (1813), a 500-ton sloop-of-war
- USS Peacock (1828), a 650-ton sloop-of-war
- Peacock was a planned name for an Algoma-class sloop, although she was canceled in 1868
- USS Peacock (AM-46), a World War I minesweeper launched 8 April 1919; sank after collision with another ship
- USS Peacock (MSC-198), a minesweeper
