= Tawaia =

Scientific classification
- Kingdom: Plantae
- Clade: Embryophytes
- Clade: Tracheophytes
- Clade: Spermatophytes
- Clade: Angiosperms
- Clade: Monocots
- Order: Alismatales
- Family: Araceae
- Genus: Tawaia; S.Y.Wong, S.L.Low & P.C.Boyce
- Species: T. sabahensis

Binomial name
- Tawaia sabahensis (S.Y.Wong, S.L.Low & P.C.Boyce) S.Y.Wong & P.C.Boyce (2018)

Synonyms
- Aridarum sabahense S.Y.Wong, S.L.Low & P.C.Boyce (2014)

Genus of flowering plants

Tawaia sabahensis is a species of flowering plant belonging to the family Araceae. It is the sole species in genus Tawaia. It is endemic to the Malaysian state of Sabah on the island of Borneo.
