= Kuria (atoll) =

Atoll in Central Gilbert Islands, Kiribati

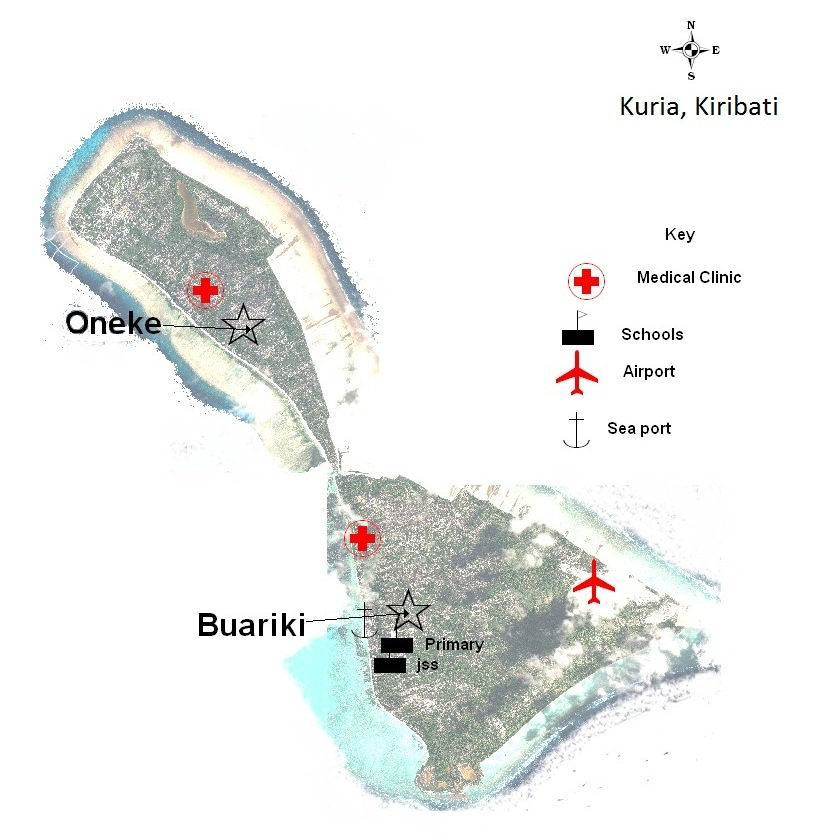
- Map of Kuria

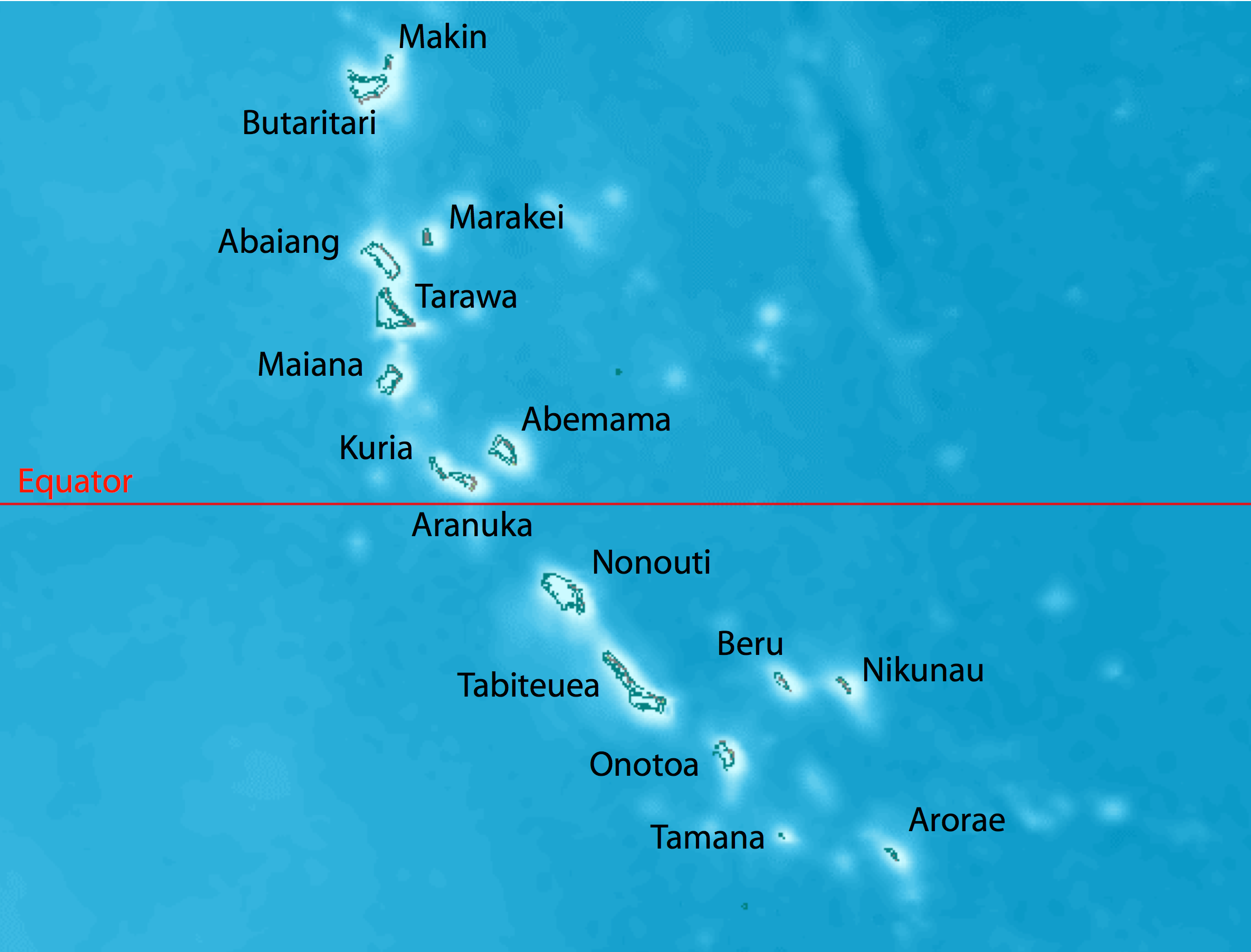

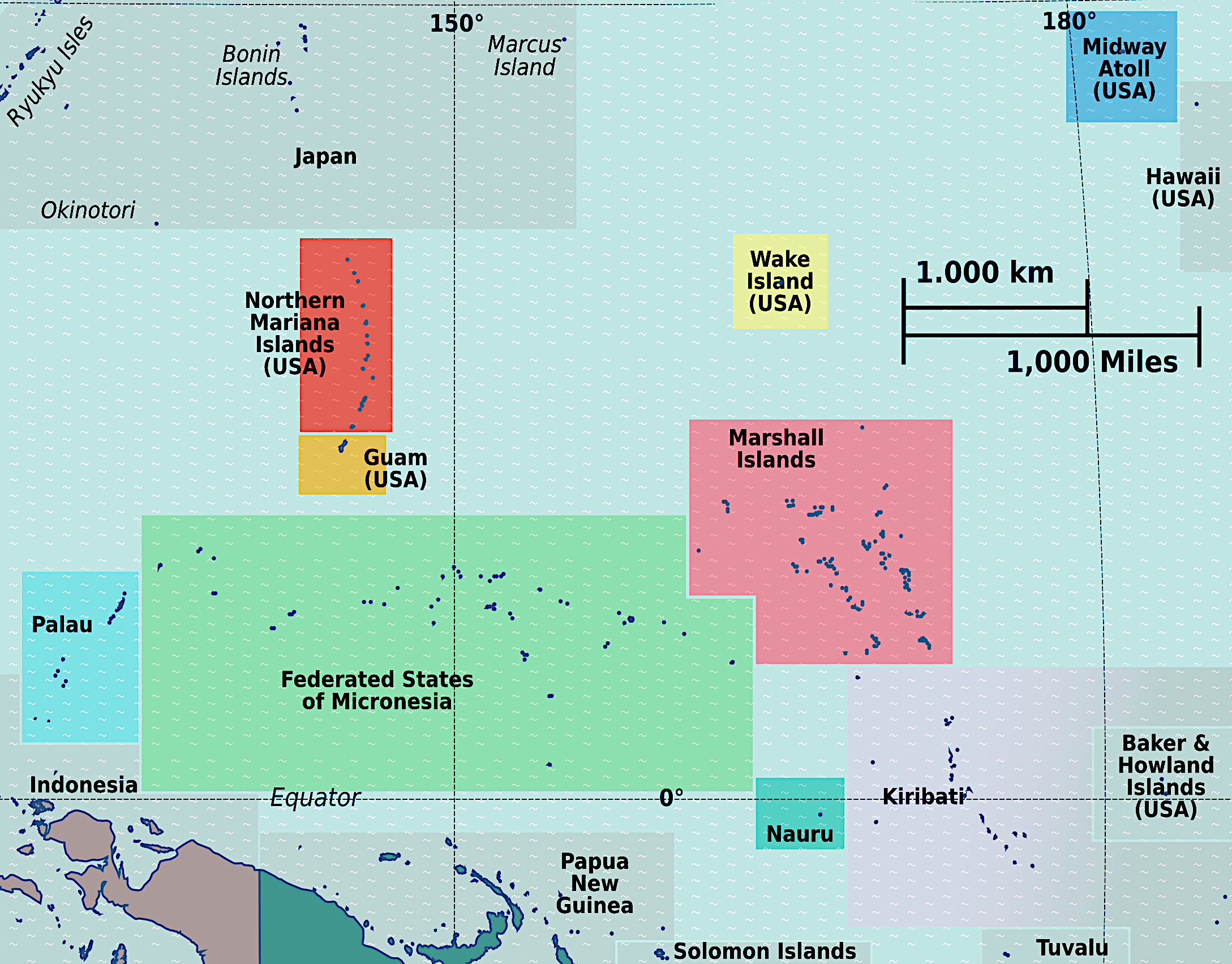
- Location within Kiribati Location within Micronesia Location within Oceania Location within Pacific Ocean

Geography
- Location: Pacific Ocean
- Coordinates: 0°13′43″N 173°24′38″E
- Archipelago: Gilbert Islands
- Area: 15.48 km^{2} (5.98 sq mi)
- Highest elevation: 3 m (10 ft)

Administration
- Kiribati

Demographics
- Population: 1,046 (2015 Census)
- Pop. density: 63/km^{2} (163/sq mi)
- Ethnic groups: I-Kiribati 100%

Kuria is an atoll, formed by a pair of islets, in the Central Gilbert Islands in Kiribati, northwest of Aranuka. The two islets, Buariki and Oneeke, are separated by a 20 metre wide channel on a shallow water platform (Te buriiti), which is crossed by a bridge of the connecting road. The islands are surrounded by fringing reef which is broadest on the eastern side of Kuria. The population of Kuria was 1,046 in 2015.

== Geography ==
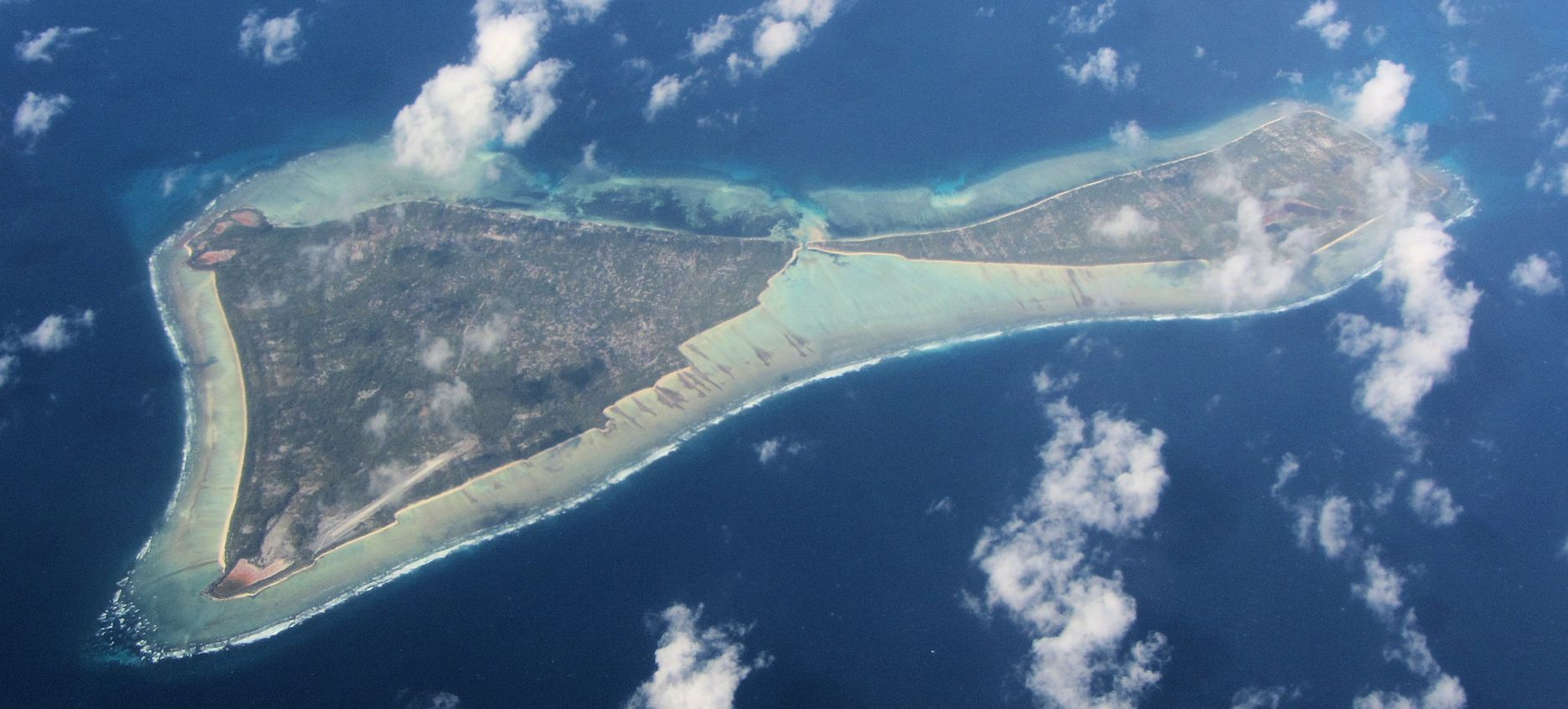
View from the air

Kuria is made up of two islets, which are reef islands as they do not have a lagoon. The main islet, Buariki, has five villages; Marenaua, Bouatoa, Buariki, Tabontebike and Norauea. These villages are connected to the smaller islet of Oneeke by a ten-metre (33 ft) bridge replacing the old causeway that ran across the former reef passage between the two islets. The two islets are relatively wide as compared to most islands in the Gilbert group. The widest portion measures 4.26 km (2.65 mi) from lagoon to the ocean side and the length from north to south is 8.94 km (5.56 mi). There are two natural brackish-water ponds at east-southern tip of the main islet. The total land area of Kuria is of 15.48 km^{2} (5.98 sq mi), which is close to the average size for an island of Kiribati, but the population in 2010 was only 980 people, making Kuria one of the least densely populated islands in Kiribati.

The main administration center is located at Buariki, and the airport, police headquarters, guest house and Junior Secondary School are also located here.

=== Villages ===
Kuria: Population and Land Area
Census Area	Population 2010	Land area by islet	Density (people per hectare)
Oneeke	154	525 hectares (1,297 acres)	0.3
Manenaua	191	1,022.7 hectares (2,527 acres)	0.8
Tabontebike	91	1,022.7 hectares (2,527 acres)	0.8
Buariki	169	1,022.7 hectares (2,527 acres)	0.8
Norauea	247	1,022.7 hectares (2,527 acres)	0.8
Bouatoa	128	1,022.7 hectares (2,527 acres)	0.8
Kuria total	980	1,547.7 hectares (3,824 acres)	0.6

== History ==
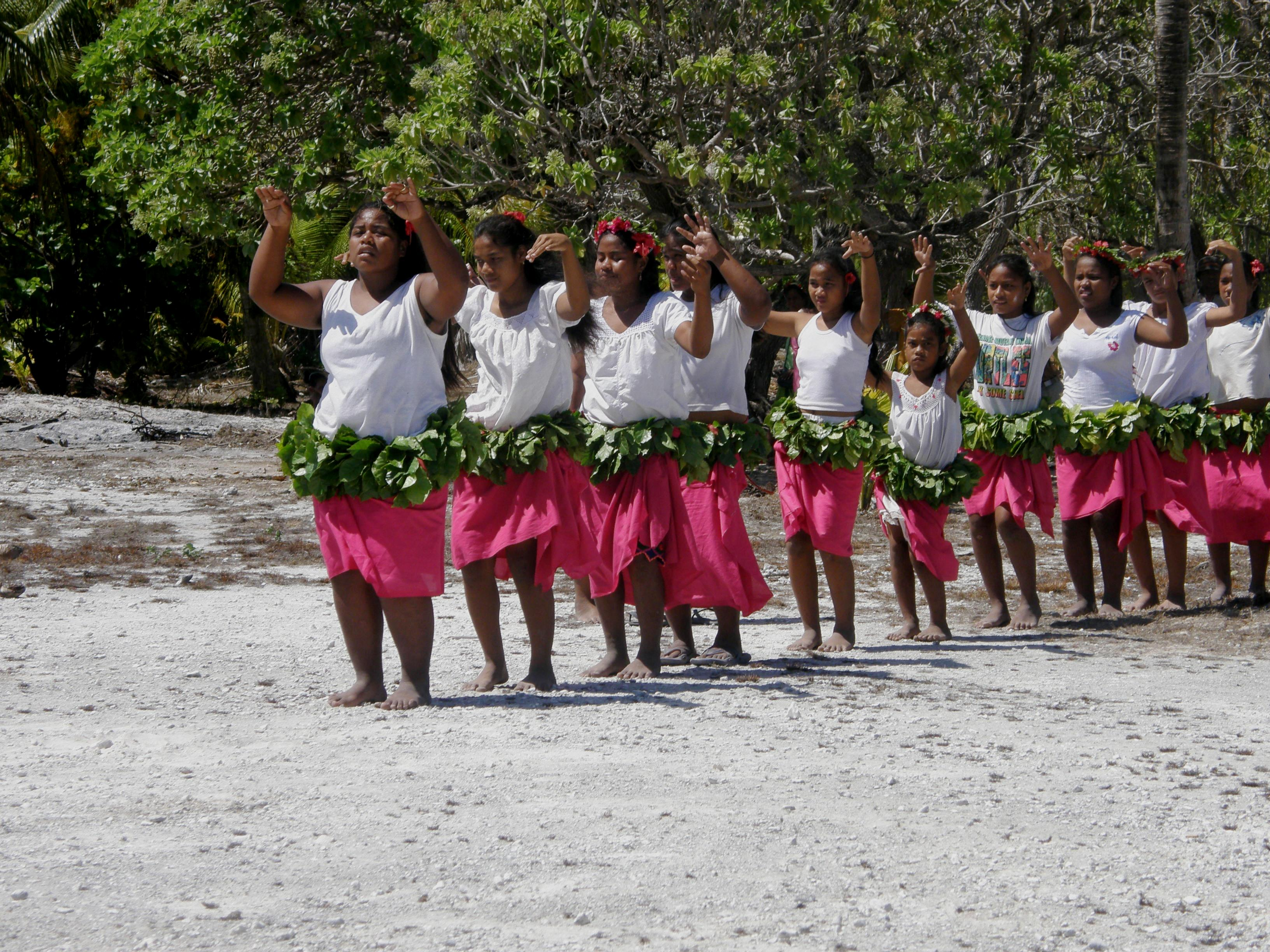
Dancers welcome important visitors to Kuria

Kuria means 'almost seen on the horizon'. (Note: Sir Arthur Grimble, cadet administrative officer in the Gilberts from 1914 and resident commissioner of the Gilbert and Ellice Islands colony from 1926, recorded the myths and oral traditions of the Kiribati people. He wrote the best-sellers A Pattern of Islands (London, John Murray 1952, and Return to the Islands (1957), which was republished by Eland, London in 2011, ISBN 978-1-906011-45-1. He also wrote Tungaru Traditions: writings on the atoll culture of the Gilbert Islands, University of Hawaii Press, Honolulu, 1989, ISBN 0-8248-1217-4.) Thomas Gilbert and John Marshall, sailing in the merchant ships Charlotte and Scarborough, were the first Europeans to describe visiting Kuria, in June 1788.

The islands were surveyed in 1841 by the US Exploring Expedition.

In the 1840s, the islands of Kuria and Aranuka were conquered by Tenkoruti or Karotu, the paramount chief or the Uea (king) of Abemama, when a former ruler (Ten Temea) of Kuria and Aranuka gave up these two islands to King Karotu from Abemama and left for Maiana, another of the Gilbert group. In 1878 Tenkoruti's nephew, Tembinok' or Tem Binoka became the Uea. He acquired firearms and manufactured goods from traders and he purchased a ship. To pay for his acquisitions he tightened his control over the 3 islands in order to increase his supply of coconuts and other produce, which he sold to the traders. Tembinok' was immortalised by Robert Louis Stevenson's description of him in his book In the South Seas. Robert Louis Stevenson spent two months on Abemama in 1889. Stevenson described Tembinok' as the "one great personage in the Gilberts … and the last tyrant".

In early European times, animals in Kuria were not considered a welcome addition to the ecosystem. As a result, introduced animals were considered a subject of supernatural fears and were slaughtered and thrown into the lagoon.

Kuria Post Office opened around 1912.

== Tourism ==
Air Kiribati operates two flights per week from South Tarawa, linking with neighbouring Aranuka Airport. Boat charters are also available.

The Island Council operates a guest house, where tourists are welcome, although it is advisable to be prepared as the island is very isolated.

Dress code is restricted on Kuria. Casual wear is preferable and women are not allowed to walk around with bikinis, mini skirts or shorts. A skirt/short covered down to your knees or wrapped around lava-lava and T-shirts are preferable.
