= Aranuka =

Atoll of Kiribati

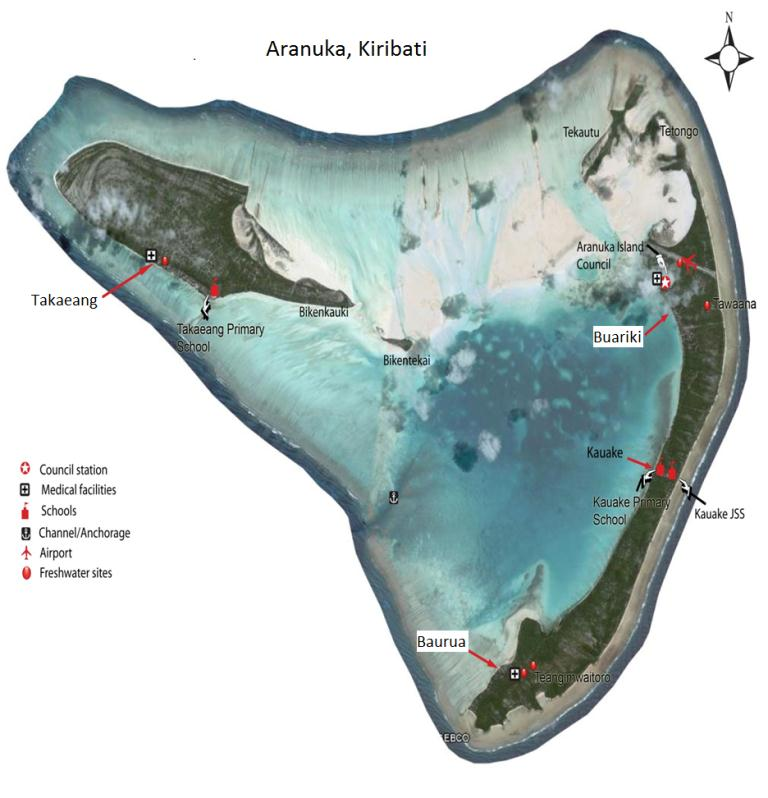
- Map of Aranuka

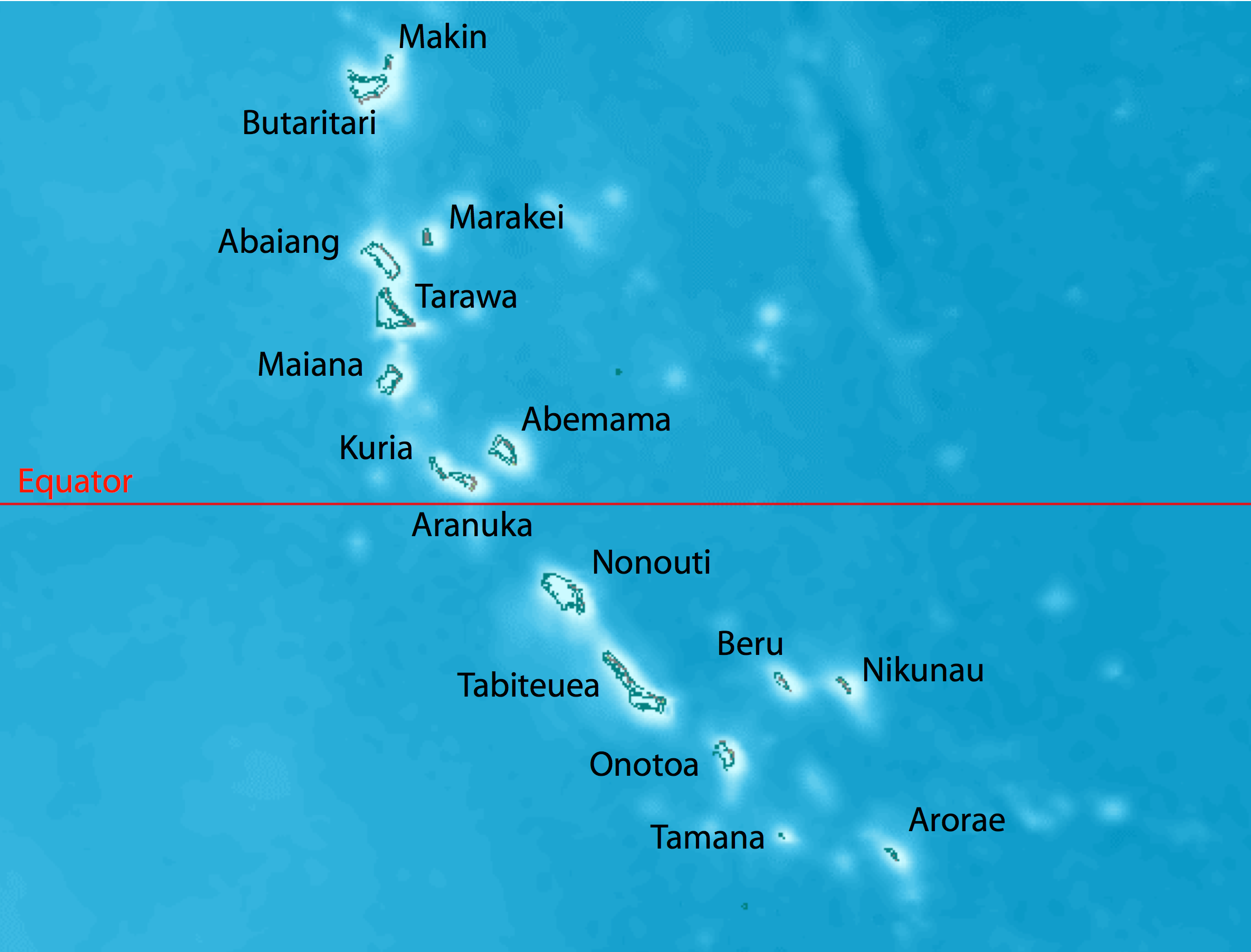

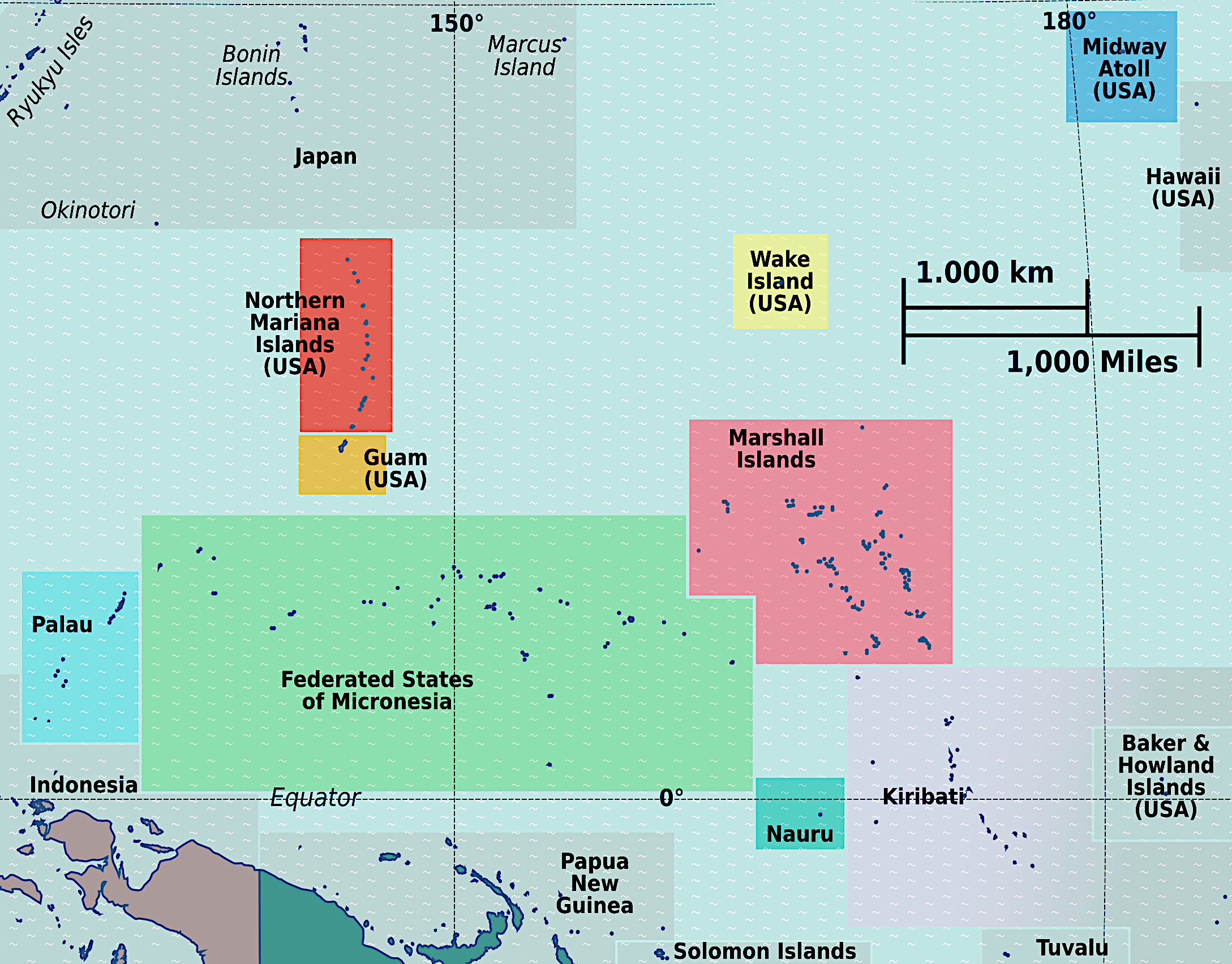
- Location within Kiribati Location within Micronesia Location within Oceania Location within Pacific Ocean

Geography
- Location: Pacific Ocean
- Coordinates: 0°09′N 173°35′E
- Archipelago: Gilbert Islands
- Area: 13.228 km^{2} (5.107 sq mi)
- Highest elevation: 3 m (10 ft)

Administration
- Kiribati
- Capital city: Buariki

Demographics
- Population: 1,125 (2015 Census)
- Pop. density: 79.9/km^{2} (206.9/sq mi)
- Ethnic groups: I-Kiribati 99.6%

Aranuka is an atoll of Kiribati, located just north of the equator, in the Gilbert Islands. It has an area of 11.6 square kilometres (4.5 square miles) and a population of 1,057 in 2010. By local tradition, Aranuka is the central island of the Gilbert group.

== Geography ==
Aranuka is an atoll with a triangular shape, predominantly formed by two large islands, Buariki and Takaeang, which is the other inhabited islet that lies 7.68 miles (12.36 kilometres) west of mainland Aranuka. Both islets are unusually large for an atoll of this size. These islands are connected by long sandbanks on the northern side and an underwater reef crest on the southern side which also has a wide pass to the lagoon in the centre.

There is only one road that runs alongside the lagoon-side of the island where villages are located and a network of access and feeder roads running from the main road to other parts of the island. These pathways generally are wide enough to accommodate pushbikes and motorbikes but not big trucks. All villages are located on the lagoon side on both sides of the main road, easily accessed by walking, with bicycles, motorbikes and trucks.

Aranuka has a lagoon, but this is not so rich in shellfish. There is a passage into the lagoon, available for the boats in moderate weather, through the middle of the reef on the southwestern side of the atoll. There are several dangerous points in the passage where tidal streams can be very strong. Aranuka is known for its old stand of Rhizophora stylosa mangroves that have grown as tall as coconut trees and are now a breeding site for birds. These mangroves can be found towards the northern end of mainland Aranuka.

=== Villages ===
The island of Aranuka had only three villages since its first establishment. In 1978, Baurua village was established with only a few inhabitants, less than 10 houses, making a total of 4 recognized villages now for Aranuka. The current populations of the villages are:

Aranuka: Population and Land Area
Census Area	Population 2010	Land area by islet	Density (people per hectare)
Uninhabited islets	0	54.8 hectares (135 acres)	0
Takaeang	252	487.4 hectares (1,204 acres)	0.5
Buariki	500	618.9 hectares (1,529 acres)	1.3
Kauake	92	618.9 hectares (1,529 acres)	1.3
Baurua	213	618.9 hectares (1,529 acres)	1.3
Aranuka total	1057	1,161.1 hectares (2,869 acres)	0.9

== History ==
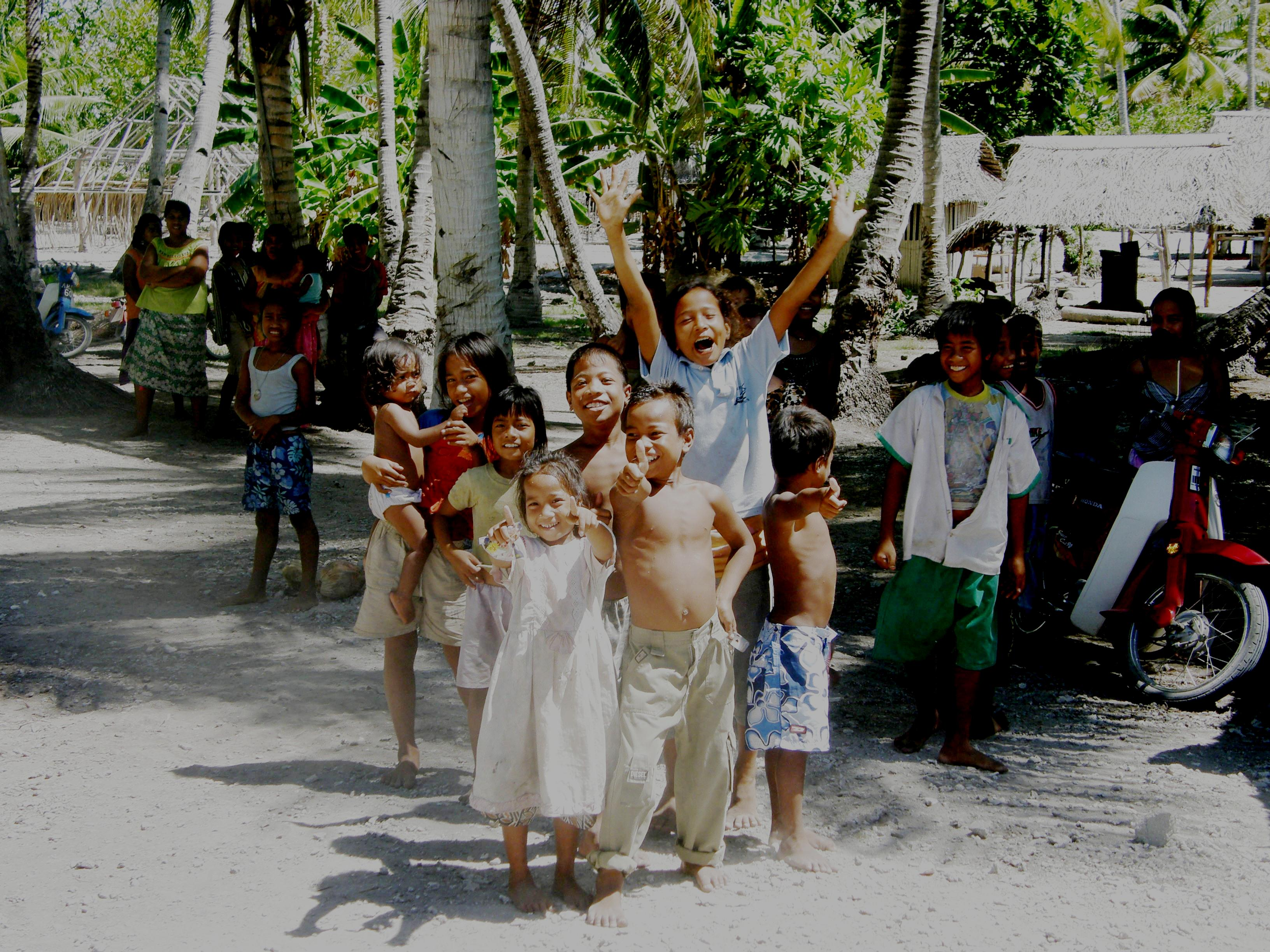
Residents of Aranuka Island, Kiribati welcome visitors

Aranuka is by tradition the island in the middle of Kiribati and the location for the formation and separation of all the islands of Kiribati which was first started by the God of our Ancestors, Nareau. That is why Aranuka was formerly named and known as Ananuka – the middle of it.

Thomas Gilbert and John Marshall, sailing in the First Fleet vessels Charlotte and Scarborough, were the first Europeans to describe visiting Aranuka, in June 1788.

The island was surveyed in 1841 by the US Exploring Expedition.

At some point between 1860 and the late 1880s, the islands of Aranuka and Kuria were conquered by Tenkoruti (King Karotu), the paramount chief of Abemama, when a former ruler (Ten Temea) of Kuria and Aranuka gave up these two islands to King Karotu from Abemama and left for Maiana, another of the Gilbert group. They were then ruled by Tenkoruti's nephew, Tem Binoka.

Aranuka Post Office opened around 1924.

== Tourism ==
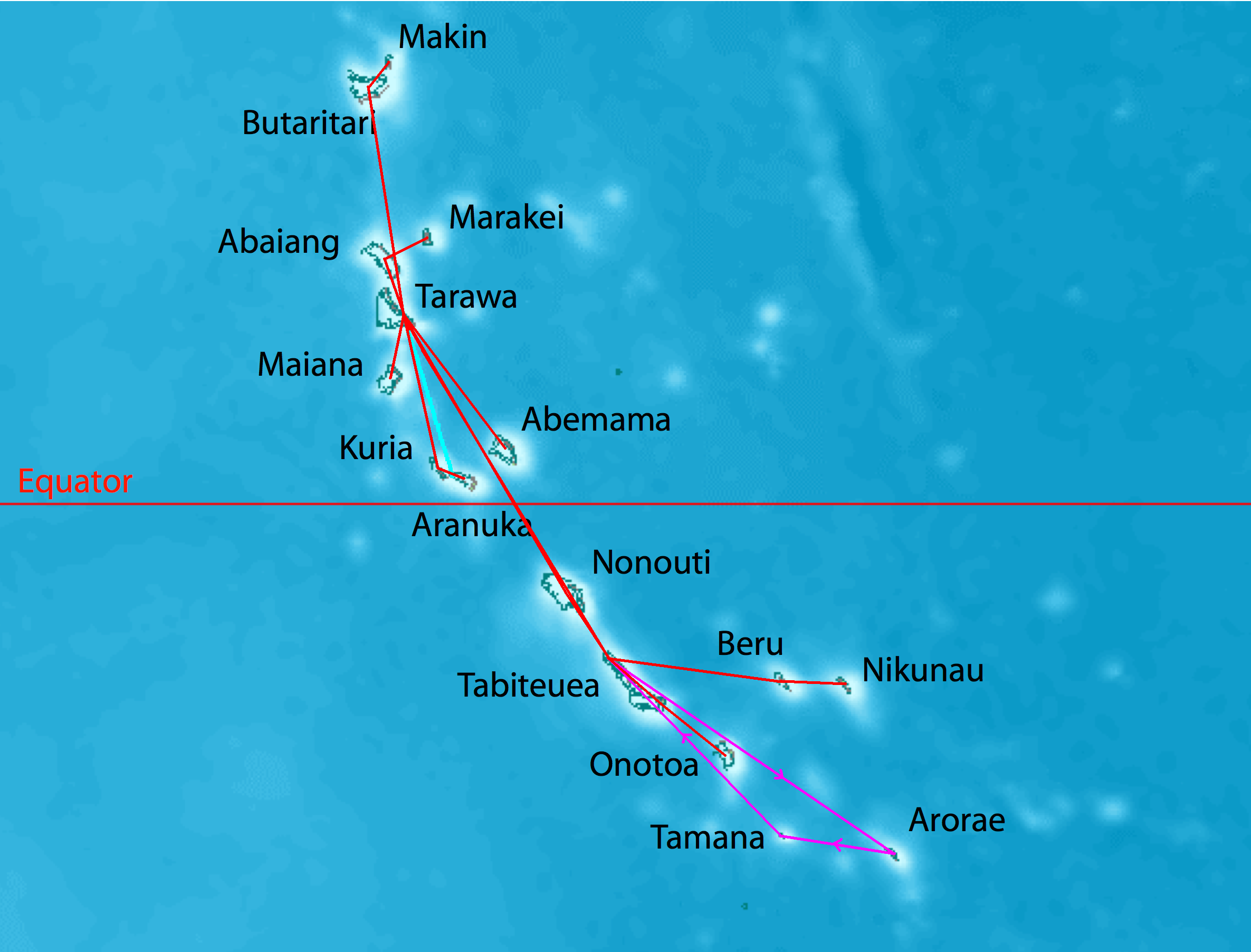
Air Kiribati routes

Aranuka has white sandy beaches and blue waters, and is the only island in Kiribati to have tall mangrove trees with heights of more than 15 m (49 ft). The uninhabited islets of the island also provide swimming and snorkeling spots for visitors.

Aranuka Airport is situated near the northern tip of Buariki, and is served by two flights a week from South Tarawa, which also link to Kuria. Charter boat services are also available.

Accommodation is provided by the Island Council guesthouse.
