= John Marshall (Royal Navy officer, born 1748) =

British explorer

Captain John Marshall
- Born: 26 February 1748 Ramsgate, Great Britain
- Died: 1819 (aged 71)
- Allegiance: Great Britain
- Branch: Royal Navy
- Rank: Captain
- Commands: Scarborough; Diana
- Conflicts: American Revolutionary War; Napoleonic Wars

Captain John Marshall (Marshallese: Jo̧o̧n M̧ajeļ; 26 February 1748 NS (15 February 1747 OS) – 1819) was a British Royal Navy officer and explorer of the Pacific. The Marshall Islands are named after him.

== Biography ==
Marshall, born in Ramsgate, Kent, England, became an apprentice sailor at age ten, and spent his life at sea.

He saw action during the American Revolutionary War of 1778 to 1783.

In 1788 he captained Scarborough, a ship of the First Fleet taking convicts from England to Botany Bay in New South Wales. He then sailed from Australia to China, charting previously unknown islands (mainly some of Gilbert Islands and Marshall Islands), as well as a new trade route to Canton (present-day Guangzhou). The islands which he had originally called "Lord Mulgrove's range" were later named by Thomas Gilbert the "Marshall Islands".

John Marshall also captained Scarborough on her second voyage transporting convicts to Australia in 1790. The convicts coming aboard were in poor health and many did not survive the voyage; this, combined with an attempted seizure of the ship by the convicts, deterred him from any further voyages of transportation.

During the Napoleonic Wars of 1803 to 1815, as captain of the ship Diana, he was severely wounded while repulsing an attack by a French privateer.

John Marshall died in 1819 at the age of 71.
