= Scarborough (1782 ship) =

British ship

- Convict transport Scarborough by Frank Allen

History

Great Britain
- Name: Scarborough
- Namesake: Scarborough, North Yorkshire
- Owner: John, George, & Thomas Hopper
- Builder: Fowler & Heward, Scarborough, North Yorkshire
- Launched: 1782, Scarborough
- Fate: Foundered April 1805

General characteristics
- Tons burthen: 41091/94, or 411, or 412, or 428 or 429 (bm) (Note: The 411 tons comes from the Register of Transports 1774-1794", Admiralty 49/127. Cited in Bateson. Contemporary Admiralty surveys also record a figure of 41836/94 tons (bm), based on design. An informal source, First Fleet Lieutenant Phillip Gidley King, estimated Scarborough at 430 tons (bm).)
- Length: 109 feet 3 inches (33.3 m) (overall); 87 feet 0 1/4 inch (26.5 m) (keel)
- Beam: 29 feet 10 inches (9.1 m)
- Depth of hold: 12 feet 5 1/2 inches (3.8 m)
- Propulsion: Sail
- Sail plan: Ship rig
- Complement: 1801:35; 1803:40
- Armament: 1783:8 × 6-pounder guns; 1800:14 × 4&6-pounder guns; 1801:4 × 4-pounder + 10 × 6-pounder guns; 1803:14 × 6&4-pounder guns

Scarborough was a double-decked, three-masted, ship-rigged, copper-sheathed, barque that participated in the First Fleet, assigned to transport convicts for the European colonisation of Australia in 1788. Also, the British East India company (EIC) chartered Scarborough to take a cargo of tea back to Britain after her two voyages transporting convicts. She spent much of her career as a West Indiaman, trading between London and the West Indies, but did perform a third voyage in 1801–02 to Bengal for the EIC. In January 1805 she repelled a French privateer of superior force in a single-ship action, before foundering in April.

== Early career ==
Scarborough spent her first four years transporting timber from the Baltic and North America. She first enters Lloyd's Register in 1783. Her entry gives her burthen as 600 tons (bm), her master as "Scorbdle", her owner as T. Hooper, and her trade as "London Transport". The next year John Marshall replaced Scorbdale as master.

In 1787 south London shipbroker William Richards chartered Scarborough for the First Fleet voyage at a rate of 12 shillings per ton (bm) per month. He selected her after first consulting with Royal Marine officers Watkin Tench and David Collins. Both marine officers would sail with the Fleet to Australia, Tench as a captain of marines and Collins as judge-advocate for the new colony. She was the second-largest transport selected for the Fleet after Alexander.

After selection, Scarborough sailed to Deptford dockyard to be refitted for convict transportation under the supervision of Naval Agent George Teer. The height between decks was increased to 6 feet 2 inches (1.9 m) amidships and between 6 feet 1 inch (1.9 m) and 5 feet 11 inches (1.8 m) fore and aft, and two windsails were brought aboard to improve the flow of air in the convict quarters. Bulkheads were also fitted to separate convict quarters from those of the marines and crew, and space set aside for stores and a sick bay. An Osbridge machine was also installed to filter Scarborough's drinking water during the voyage to New South Wales. (Note: Osbridge machines: a rudimentary means of circulating water to remove sediment and reduce the incidence of bacteria. Naval surgeon William Turnbull described their operation as follows, "This machine consists of a hand pump which is inserted in a scuttle made at the top of the cask, and by means of it the water, being raised a few feet, falls through several sheets of tin pierced like colanders, and placed in a half-cylinder of the same metal. The purpose of it is to reduce the water into numberless drops, which being exposed in this form to the open air is deprived of its offensive quality.") Teer was entirely satisfied with Scarborough's fitout; in December 1786 he advised the Navy Board that she and her fellow First Fleet transports were "completed fitted [with] provisions and accommodations .. better than any other set of transports I have ever had any directions in." (Note: Captain George Teer to Navy Board, 7 December 1786.)

Scarborough's crew as a convict transport was approximately 35 men including her master, three mates, a boatswain and a ship's surgeon.

== Voyage with the First Fleet ==
On her first convict voyage, as part of the First Fleet, her master was John Marshall and her surgeon was Dennis Considen. She left Portsmouth on 13 May 1787, carrying 208 male convicts, together with officers and 34 other ranks of the New South Wales Marine Corps. On the way Marshall suspected that the convicts had a plan to mutiny. An informer named two ringleaders, whom Marshall then transferred to HMS Sirius. There they received 24 lashes each and then were again transferred, this time to Prince of Wales. She arrived at Port Jackson, Sydney, on 26 January 1788.

On leaving Port Jackson on 6 May 1788, in company with Charlotte, she travelled to China. On 17 May 1788 the two ships landed at Lord Howe Island for birds and vegetables, then sailed for Whampoa. En route, the ships became the first European vessels to pass among the Marshall and Gilbert islands. Further north, they made landfall on Tinian in the Northern Marianas, where both ships were forced to anchor. The long sea voyage had depleted Scarborough's stores, and scurvy had become rampant among her crew. Fifteen of the sickest men were brought ashore on Tinian and housed in tents on the dunes, while the remainder of the crew foraged for food. While anchored off Tinian, both vessels were nearly blown onto shore by strong winds, but disaster was averted when their captains decided to cut the anchor ropes and raise sail to move off shore.

After several weeks recovery on Tinian, Scarborough's crew had returned to sufficient health for the voyage to resume. In easy sailing weather, Scarborough and Charlotte reached Macau on 9 September and Whampoa shortly afterwards. There the EIC chartered them as an "extra ship". They received cargoes of tea and made ready to sail to England. Departing Whampoa on 17 December, the ships reached St. Helena by 20 March 1789 and arrived in England on 15 June.

== Voyage with the Second Fleet ==
Scarborough returned to New South Wales with the notorious Second Fleet. In company with Surprize and Neptune, she sailed from England with 253 male convicts on 19 January 1790. Her master was again John Marshall and the surgeon was Augustus Jacob Beyer.

On the 18 February, several convicts plotted a mutiny. They chose as their leader Samuel Burt, who revealed the plot to the ship's officers. The plotters were interrogated, and several were severely flogged. Others were chained to the deck.

Scarborough arrived at the Cape of Good Hope on 13 April 1790, and spent 16 days there, taking on provisions, and eight male convicts from HMS Guardian, which had been wrecked after striking an iceberg. She and Neptune parted from Surprize in heavy weather and arrived at Port Jackson on 28 June - 160 days out from England. During the voyage 68 convicts died and 96 (37%) were sick when landed. After landing, a total of 124 convicts who had arrived in Port Jackson succumbed to disease. She also brought with her two officers and 38 soldiers.

Scarborough returned to England in 1792, via China.

== Later service ==
Scarborough's Pacific voyages had left her increasingly decrepit and in need of repairs to her hull. In 1792 she was re-sheeted to remove damage caused by shipworm, and then plied between London and St. Petersburg. Further repairs were undertaken in 1795 and 1798. In 1800 to 1801, under Captain J. Scott, she shuttled back and forth between London and the Caribbean, carrying trade goods and provisions for British colonies including St. Vincents, with extensive repairs between voyages. In 1801 Lloyd's Register gives her trade as London to St. Vincents, and then London to the East Indies.

On 10 December 1800 Captain John Scott received a letter of marque. Mr. Charles Kensington tendered Scarborough to the East India Company to bring back rice from Bengal. She was one of 28 vessels that sailed on that mission between December 1800 and February 1801.

Scott left Falmouth on 25 January 1801 for Bengal. Scarborough arrived at Calcutta on 19 June. Homeward bound, she left Diamond Harbour on 21 August, reached the Cape on 22 December and St Helena on 28 January 1802, and arrived at the Downs on 8 April.

In 1802 her owners sold Scarborough to Charles Kensington. However, on 10 November she was sold to foreign buyers and her registration was cancelled.

In 1803 her former owners repurchased her to use her as a West Indiaman. Captain John Scott received a letter of marque on 15 December 1803. For the next two years she plied a route between London and Tobago.

== Single-ship action ==
In December 1804, Scarborough, under Captain James Scott, left the Motherbank in a convoy for the West Indies. She joined with HMS Swift and ten other vessels but a gale dispersed the vessels on 5 January. Scarborough joined Dorset and King George, and the three agreed to keep company to Barbados. On 26 January, they encountered a French privateer of 16 guns and nearly 200 men. In order to be able to resist, Scott asked for reinforcements from his two companion vessels. Their captains agreed and seven men came over from Dorset and five from King George, giving Scott 27 men and boys in total, including a passenger from the 60th Regiment who joined in. At 4 p.m. an engagement ensued that was estimated to last an hour. Scarborough succeeded in repelling the privateer, but at the cost of one man killed and her first officer mortally wounded. James Scott speculated that the privateer had suffered 70 casualties. The three British ships reached Barbados the next day.

== Fate ==
In April 1805, Scarborough began leaking heavily while at sea and foundered off Port Royal, Jamaica.

== Postscript ==
An Urban Transit Authority First Fleet ferry was named after Scarborough in 1986.

== See also ==
- Artist's impression of Scarborough
- First Fleet
- Journals of the First Fleet
- List of convicts on the First Fleet
