= James Wightman Davidson =

New Zealand historian

James Wightman Davidson (1 October 1915 – 8 April 1973) was a New Zealand historian and constitutional adviser. Professor of Pacific History at the Australian National University from 1950 to 1973, Davidson was the "founding father of modern Pacific Islands historiography as well as constitutional adviser to a succession of Island territories in the throes of decolonisation".

== Life ==
Davidson was born in Wellington, New Zealand on 1 October 1915. He was educated at Waitaki Boys' High School and Victoria University College before studying as a doctoral student at St John's College, Cambridge. He gained his PhD in 1942 with a thesis on European penetration of the South Pacific, 1779-1842. After wartime work for the Naval Intelligence Division, Davidson returned to a fellowship at St John's, becoming university lecturer in colonial studies in 1947.

While advising chiefs in Western Samoa in 1949, Davidson accepted the new chair of Pacific History at the newly established Research School of Pacific (and Asian) Studies at the Australian National University. He continued advising islanders, helping to draft constitutions for the Cook Islands (from 1963), Nauru (from 1967), Micronesia (from 1969) and Papua New Guinea (at the time of his death). He died in Port Moresby and his body was buried in Canberra.

== Works ==
- The Northern Rhodesian Legislative Council, 1947
- Samoa mo Samoa; the emergence of the independent state of Western Samoa, 1967
- Pacific Islands portraits, 1970
- Peter Dillon of Vanikoro: Chevalier of the South Seas, 1974
