= Maneaba =

Community meeting house in Kiribati

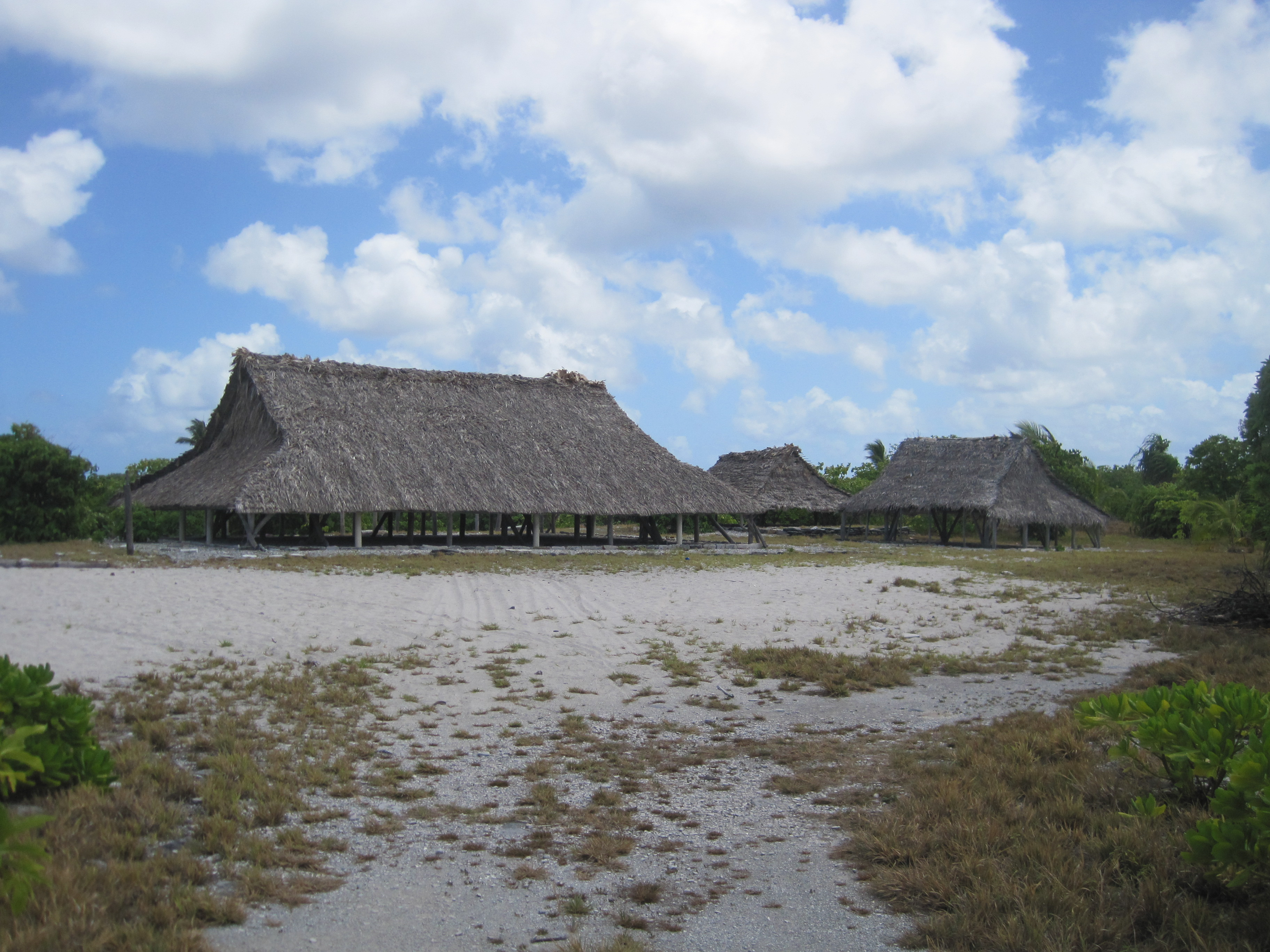
Traditional maneaba in Babaroroa, Arorae atoll, Kiribati

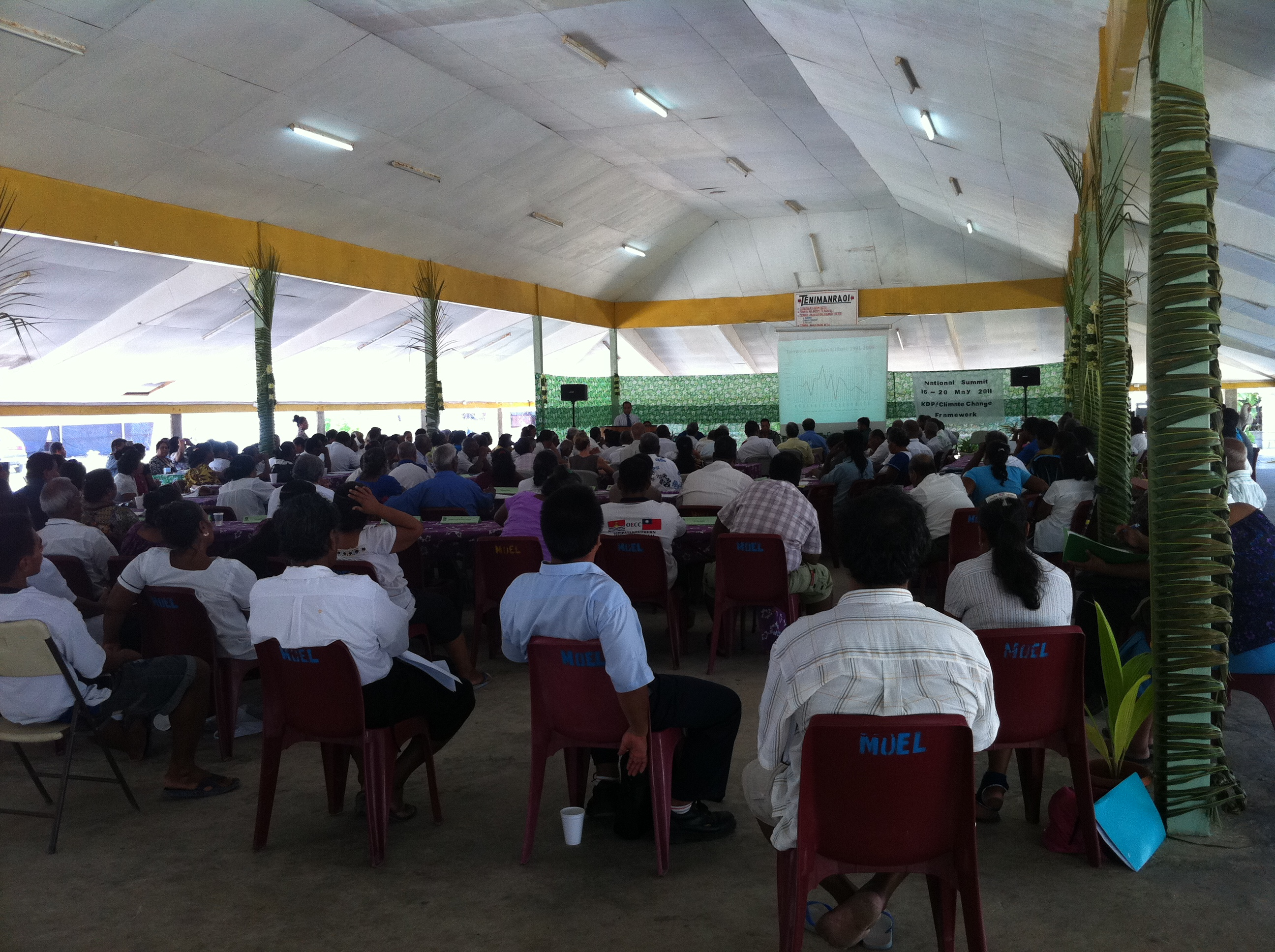
Tenimanraoi maneaba in Betio, Kiribati

A maneaba (lit. 'meeting house') is a traditional centre of tribal and national governance in Kiribati.

A maneaba is typically a structure formed of a high coconut wood roof supported by coral, held together with coconut string, and thatched with pandanus leaves. The whole community is involved in its construction, and every aspect of the maneaba has a symbolic as well as a practical function.

A maneaba serves a similar cultural role to a Polynesian marae. In the neighbouring islands of Tuvalu (formerly called the Ellice Islands), the meeting house is called the maneapa or ahiga. The sharing of the name is the result of Kiribati and Tuvalu being previously the British crown colony of the Gilbert and Ellice Islands.

The House of Assembly or Government of Kiribati is referred to as the Maneaba ni Maungatabu (lit. 'Maneaba of the Sacred Mountain').

== Bibliography ==
- Maude, H. E. (1977), The evolution of the Gilbertese boti. An ethnohistorical interpretation, Institute of Pacific Studies and Gilbert Islands Extension Centre of the University of the South Pacific, Suva (First printed: Polynesian Society, Wellington 1963).
- Maude, H. E. (1980), The Gilbertese maneaba, The Institute of Pacific Studies and the Kiribati Extension Centre of the University of the South Pacific, (Suva).
- Lundsgaarde, Henry P. (1978), "Post-contact changes in Gilbertese maneaba organization", in Gunson, Niel (ed.), The Changing Pacific. Essays in Honour of H. E. Maude, Melbourne: Oxford University Press, pp. 67–79, ISBN 0-19-550518-2.
