= Henry Evans Maude =

British colonial administrator (1906–2006)

Resident Commissioner of the Gilbert and Ellice Islands
- In office 1946–1949
- Preceded by: Vivian Fox-Strangways
- Succeeded by: John Peel

Personal details
- Born: 1 October 1906 Bankipore, India
- Died: 4 November 2006 (aged 100) Canberra, Australia
- Occupation: Anthropologist and Colonial Service

Henry Evans Maude, OBE (1 October 1906 – 4 November 2006) was a British Colonial Service administrator, historian and anthropologist.

== Life and career ==
Maude was born in Bankipore, India. Educated at Highgate School from 1921 to 1925, and Jesus College, Cambridge, Maude represented India at rifle-shooting in 1926.

He spent the years 1929–1948 working as a civil servant and administrator in various Pacific Islands. Between 1940 and 1941, Maude was sent to the Pitcairn Islands by the Western Pacific High Commission, to modernise the government, and to establish a post office and issue stamps in order to generate revenue for the people of the island. During this time, Maude and his wife collected a great number of Polynesian archaeological items found on the Pitcairn Islands, later donated to the Auckland War Memorial Museum in New Zealand. The almost 1,500 item collection composes the largest known collection of cultural artefacts from the islands. Maude spent much time in the British colony of the Gilbert and Ellice Islands, serving as land commissioner before WWII then, after the Japanese occupation of the Gilbert Islands, as Resident Commissioner from 1946 to 1949. From 1949 to 1955, he worked for the South Pacific Commission.

From 1957 to 1961, he was a Research Fellow at the Research School of Pacific and Asian Studies (RSPAS), which is part of the Australian National University in Canberra. He has published widely on aspects of Pacific Islands history, was a co-founder of the Journal of Pacific History, and played an important role in establishing the Pacific Manuscripts Bureau.

== Personal life ==
He was the husband of Honor Courtney Maude (née King), a British-Australian authority on Oceanic string figures. She predeceased him, dying in 2001 in Canberra, aged 95.

== Death and legacy ==
Maude died, aged 100, on 4 November 2006. The bulk of Maude's personal papers are held at the Barr Smith Library at the University of Adelaide, where an extensive set of pages devoted to his life and work can be found. He published the work of Sir Arthur Grimble.

== Bibliography ==
- Doug Munro, "Harry Maude—Loyal lieutenant, incurable romantic", The Ivory Tower and Beyond : Participant Historians of the Pacific, Newcastle upon Tyne, Cambridge Scholars Publishing, 2009, pp. 171–242.
- Woodburn, Susan (2003), Where our hearts still lie: Harry and Honor Maude in the Pacific islands, Crawford House Publishers, ISBN 978-1-86333-245-3.
- Gunson, Niel (1978), The Changing Pacific: Essays in Honour of H. E. Maude, Oxford University Press.
- Maude, H. E. (1968), Of Islands & Men, Melbourne, Oxford University Press.
- Maude, H. E. (1981) Slavers in Paradise; The Peruvian labour trade in Polynesia, 1862-1864, Canberra, Australian National University Press, ISBN 0-7081-1607-8

== See also ==
- Pacific Manuscripts Bureau
