= Abemama =

Atoll of Kiribati

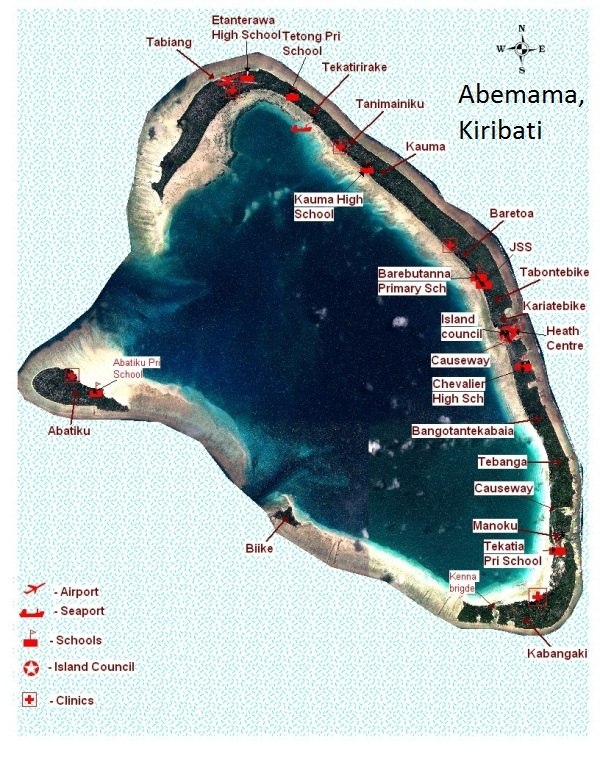
- Map of Abemama

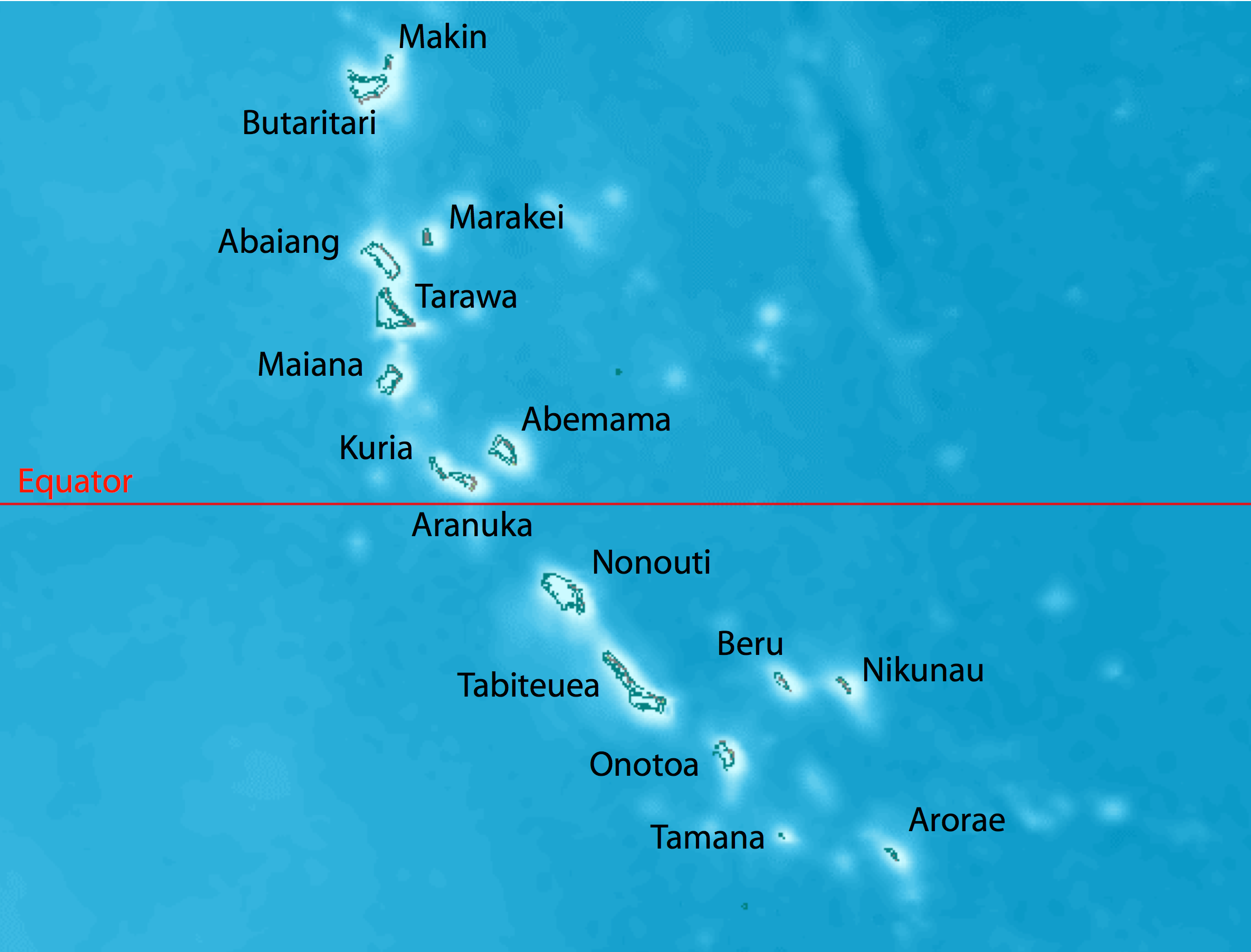

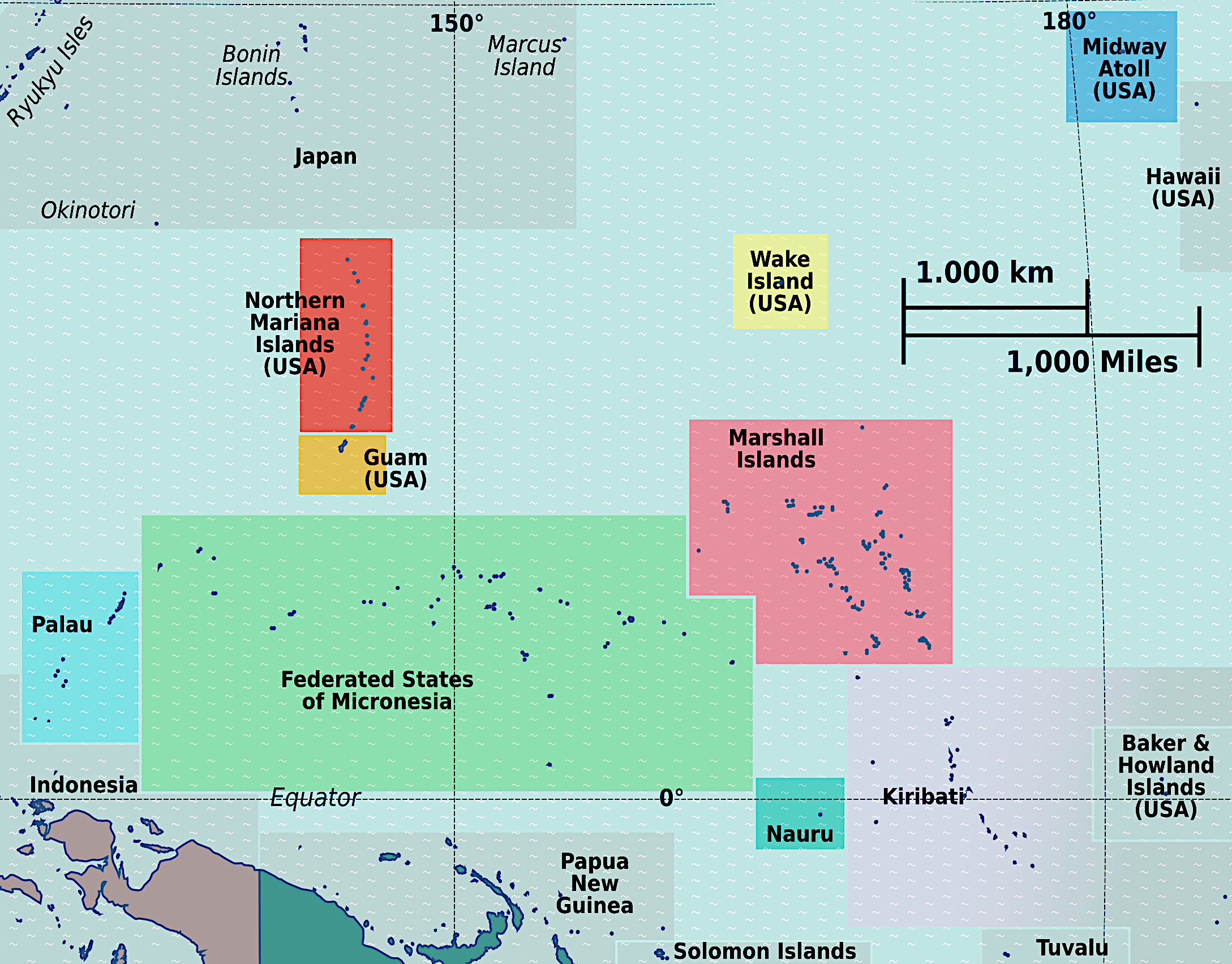
- Location within Kiribati Location within Micronesia Location within Oceania Location within Pacific Ocean

Geography
- Location: Pacific Ocean
- Coordinates: 0°24′N 173°52′E
- Archipelago: Gilbert Islands
- Area: 27.37 km^{2} (10.57 sq mi)
- Highest elevation: 3 m (10 ft)

Administration
- Kiribati
- Largest settlement: Kariatebike

Demographics
- Population: 3,262 (2015 Census)
- Pop. density: 117/km^{2} (303/sq mi)
- Ethnic groups: I-Kiribati 98.8%

Abemama (Apamama) is an atoll, one of the Gilberts group in Kiribati, and is located 152 kilometres (94 miles) southeast of Tarawa and just north of the Equator. Abemama has an area of 27.37 square kilometres (10.57 square miles) and a population of 3,299 as of 2015. The islets surround a deep lagoon. The eastern part of the atoll of Abemama is linked together by causeways making automobile traffic possible between the different islets. The outlying islands of Abatiku and Biike are situated on the southwestern side of the atoll.

The village of Kariatebike serves as the government center for the atoll which includes an administration building, the police station and a hospital.

Abemama was formerly known as Roger Simpson Island, Dundas Island, Hopper Island, or Simpson Island.

== Geography ==
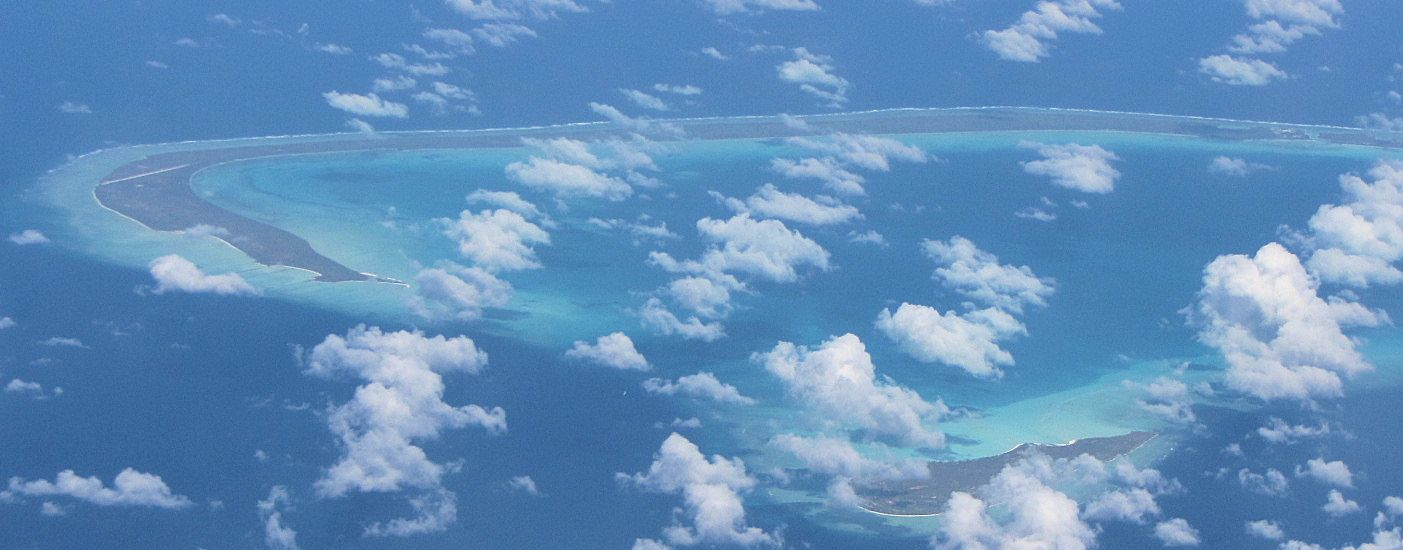
Abemama atoll from the air

Abemama has a land area of 27.39 square kilometres (11 square miles) with a width varying from 50 metres (160 feet) to 2 kilometres (1.2 miles). The island has 3 main islets; the largest and main islet has 11 villages and is home to most of the population. Abatiku, an islet located at the north-western reef, and Biike just south of it, have much smaller populations.

The island has a lagoon area and an abundance of lagoon fish, shellfish, and worms. There are also some seaweed farms. Causeways were constructed to link all villages on the main islet. The island resembles an incomplete “G” letter, with two reef passages; one is located in between Abatiku and Tabiang village at the north-western end. The other is between Biike and Kenna, the latter being the southernmost end of the main islet. The island is surrounded with an exposed reef at the windward side and submerged reef at the leeward side where Biike and Abatiku are situated. Most of the important food crops in Kiribati such as coconut, giant taro, pandanus and breadfruit grow well in Abemama.

=== Villages ===
Abemama: Population and Land Area
Census Area	Population 2010	Land area by islet	Density (people per hectare)
Abatiku	150	279.2 hectares (690 acres)	0.5
Tabiang	487	2,425.2 hectares (5,993 acres)	1.3
Tanimainiku	182	2,425.2 hectares (5,993 acres)	1.3
Tekatirirake	250	2,425.2 hectares (5,993 acres)	1.3
Kauma	74	2,425.2 hectares (5,993 acres)	1.3
Baretoa	387	2,425.2 hectares (5,993 acres)	1.3
Tabontebike	380	2,425.2 hectares (5,993 acres)	1.3
Kariatebike	505	2,425.2 hectares (5,993 acres)	1.3
Bangotantekabaia	79	2,425.2 hectares (5,993 acres)	1.3
Tebanga	62	2,425.2 hectares (5,993 acres)	1.3
Manoku	170	2,425.2 hectares (5,993 acres)	1.3
Kabangaki	474	2,425.2 hectares (5,993 acres)	1.3
Biike	13	32.3 hectares (80 acres)	0.4
Abemama total	3213	2,736.7 hectares (6,763 acres)	1.2

== History ==
Royal flag of Abemama

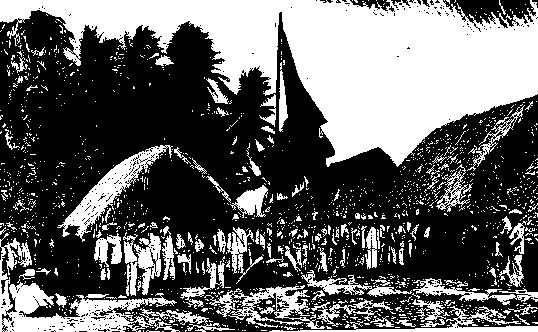
Declaration of a protectorate on Abemama by Captain Davis, 27 May 1892

Captain Charles Bishop happened upon Abemama in 1799 and referred to it on his map as Roger Simpson Island, after one of his friends.

The island was surveyed in 1841 by the US Exploring Expedition.

In the mid to late 19th Century, Abemama was ruled by a single paramount chief. This contrasts with the Northern Gilbert Islands where groups of families or kainga would have their own separate leaders, and the Southern Gilberts (from Nonouti southwards) where the old men or unimwane collectively would meet in the maneaba to govern. Some European sources describe the chiefly family of Abemama as "the Gilbert Islands ruling family" but local sources recognise that the unimwane wield much of the power even on Abemama, and governing the whole of the Gilbert Islands as a single unit is a logistical challenge even in modern times.

Abemama is known as the island where the declaration of a British Protectorate was first proclaimed by Captain Edward Davis of HMS Royalist (1883) on 27 May 1892.

Abemama Post Office opened around 1910.

Robert Louis Stevenson, Fanny Vandegrift Stevenson and her son Lloyd Osbourne spent 2 months on Abemama in 1889. Near Tabontebike is the tomb of tyrant-chief Tem Binoka, who was immortalized by Stevenson in his account of the 1889 voyage of the Equator published as In the South Seas Robert Louis Stevenson, Fanny Vandegrift Stevenson and Lloyd Osbourne returned to Abemama in July 1890 during their cruise on the trading steamer the Janet Nicoll.

=== World War II ===
Japan occupied the Gilberts on 9 December 1941.

On 21 November 1943, the American submarine USS Nautilus landed a company of 78 U.S. Marine Corps Amphibious Reconnaissance Scouts with Australian Army Lt George Hand formerly of the Ocean Island Defence Force acting as an interpreter to seize the island. They defeated the Japanese garrison with fire support from Nautilus. On the morning of 25 November, a native reported to the Marines that the remaining Japanese committed suicide. The US Navy built Naval Base Abemama on the island and departed in the fall of 1944.

== Tourism ==
Abemama is close to the capital of South Tarawa. Abemama Atoll Airport is located on the north end of Abemama near the village of Tabiang. It has regular connections with the international airport in Tarawa twice weekly, on Wednesday and Sunday.

There are three guest houses on Abemama; the Island Council guest house, Chevalier College guest house, and one private lodge.

== Education ==
The island has the following Christian senior high schools:

- Chevalier School
- Kauma Adventist High School - Also has junior high school
- Alfred sad memorial college

King George V School, a secondary school for boys which opened in Bairiki in 1922, moved to Abemama, and then to Bikenibeu in 1953.
