= Tekinaiti =

- Tekinaiti in 1965 (Note: This photograph is from PIM 1965, p. 19. It was taken while Tekinaiti was serving as Assistant Resettlement Officer in the Solomon Islands. More photographs in Tekinaiti appear on McGregor 1968, p. 80, 81.)

Uea of Abemama, Kuria and Aranuka
- Reign: 1935 – c. 1964
- Predecessor: Tokatake
- Successor: Bauro Tokatake
- Regent: Tabere (1935 – c. 1941)
- Flourished: 1916 – 1968
- Issue: Bauro Tokatake
- Father: Tokatake
- Mother: Agnes Murdoch

Tekinaiti ([tekinais]; (Note: In the Gilbertese language, ti is usually pronounced as 'si' (see) but is pronounced as English 's' at the end of a word. For further information, see Gilbertese language § Phonology) fl. 1916 – c. 1968), also known as George Tekinaiti Tokatake, was the seventh uea (high chief) of Abemama, Kuria and Aranuka in the Gilbert and Ellice Islands (modern-day Kiribati and Tuvalu), a British colony. Tekinaiti inherited the title from his father, Tokatake, who died in 1935. Although the title held no legal power with the colonial government, Tekinaiti still possessed customary authority. He moved to the British Solomon Islands in the early 1960s. The title was inherited by his son, Bauro Tokatake.

== Early life ==
The Gilbert Islands (modern-day Kiribati) were annexed into the British Empire in 1892, leading to the decline of the power of high chiefs (uea) in favour of magistrates. By 1907, the office of high chief was reported to be abolished in the British-backed Native Governments of the islands that had had one. However, the high chiefs retained some authority in a customary context, and chiefly families remained influential, both working and competing with the Native Governments.

Tekinaiti was born c. 1916. (Note: In a February 1945 National Geographic article, Tekinaiti is said to be 27 years old. However, Tekinaiti appears in a 1916 genealogical book, written by Paul I. Simon, his great-uncle. This book was hand-copied by John (Tiaon?) R. Tokatake in 1960. His siblings also appear in the genealogies, but his son does not. The age given in the article could be erroneous, or John may have introduced newer names while copying the book.) His father, Tokatake, was the uea of Abemama, Kuria and Aranuka in the Gilberts. His mother, Agnes Tokatake (née Murdoch; Gilbertese: Akineti), was the eldest daughter of George McGhee Murdoch, a Scot who owned a trading post and a small estate on Kuria, and his first wife, a Gilbertese woman named Takeiti. European traders were accepted into Gilbertese communities. Their Euronesian children, who were held in high regard, were often married into wealthy local families. Tekinaiti had four younger siblings: Binatake, Taonamaina, Tiare, and Tiaon. The latter three were also known as Molly, Charles, and John, respectively.

Tekinaiti was educated at the King George V School, a boys' government school on Tarawa, and he spoke English well. The main purpose of government schools was to produce capable employees for government service, so academics were sidelined. Students at the King George V School were enrolled for approximately five years.

When Tekinaiti was 16, he was married to the Euronesian daughter of Captain Jimmy Smith, a well-known resident trader on Abemama. (Note: One source describes Tekinaiti's mother-in-law as Nauruan. Another describes her as the daughter of an American father and a Samoan mother, and yet another describes her as Gilbertese.) Their son, Bauro, was born in 1931 or 1932. (Note: Bauro was 49 in 1981, placing his birth in 1931 or 1932.)

== Reign ==
Tekinaiti customarily ruled Abemama, Kuria and Aranuka.

When Tokatake died in 1935, Tekinaiti was deemed too young to reign. Tokatake's brother, Tabere, served as uea in Tekinaiti's stead. After a visit to the Gilbert Islands in October 1941, Pacific Islands Monthly's R. W. Robson reported that Tabere had died and Tekinaiti had assumed the position. Most of the land on Abemama, Kuria and Aranuka was owned by the chiefly family. Many people on Kuria and Aranuka were dissatisfied with the chiefly house continuing to extract tribute from them in the form of rent. According to Robson, disgruntled Kurians and Aranukans were holding meetings and some were even suggesting revolt. Agnes Tokatake, Tekinaiti's mother, expressed to Robson her great anxiety about what would happen to her son if the unrest escalated.

During World War II, the Empire of Japan took the Gilbert Islands from the British. Japanese occupation began in December 1941 in Butaritari. Most of the Europeans evacuated before the occupation spread south to Tarawa and Abemama, and many Gilbertese people lost their faith in Britain. An anecdote about Tekinaiti during this time appeared in Pacific Islands Monthly (PIM) in 1944. According to the magazine, the Japanese were aware of how colonial rule eroded the power of the high chiefs. Imagining the resentment that this would have inspired, they thought about enlisting Tekinaiti as a collaborator—until they saw him without the white singlet he almost always had on. It turned out a Union Jack was tattooed across his chest. Afterwards, Tekinaiti was regarded with suspicion as "probably pro-British".

After U.S. forces liberated Abemama from Japan in November 1943, the Americans established a small naval base. Nonouti, the island that the Japanese had exiled Tekinaiti to, was retaken the following month. On 21 December, Tekinaiti led a triumphant procession on Nonouti with the Resident Commissioner. Their path, strewn with palm branches, was reportedly lined by thousands of people. (Note: The 1947 census recorded a population of only 2,004 on Nonouti.) On Christmas Eve, Tekinaiti and a hundred other people crowded on to the USS PC-599. The small craft returned them to Abemama, where they participated in further celebrations.

Census figures during Tekinaiti's reign
Year	Abemama	Kuria	Aranuka	Total
1947	1174	315	366	1855
1963 (Note: Because the exact year that Tekinaiti abdicated is not known from the cited sources, his son, Bauro, may have already been ruling in 1963.)	2060	729	533	3322
From National Statistics Office 2021, p. 17.

In 1944, Tekinaiti's legitimacy was briefly challenged on Abemama by supporters of Taburimai, a grand-nephew of Binoka, the "most infamous of all Uea." This small minority claimed that Tekinaiti had behaved in a dishonourable manner, failed to concern himself with his subjects' welfare, and had less ba n uea (chiefly) (Note: Trussel & Groves define ba literally as "leaf, palm, midrib of palm leaf, page of paper, card, leaflet". In a figurative sense, ba is also defined as "height, rank, class, excellence". One example given is te ba n uea "royalty, prince".) blood than Taburimai. (Note: Although Tekinaiti held the title by right of primogeniture, an analysis of his father's ancestry reveals some truth to the latter claim. Tekinaiti's father, Tokatake, was a nephew of a nephew of Binoka. Binoka had no children and adopted his nephew, Bauro (Paul I. Simon), as his heir. Tokatake's maternal grandfather was a brother of Binoka's, Timon, and therefore ba n uea. However, Tokatake's maternal grandmother was of the landless class (rang). Although Bauro had undergone an adoption ceremony that ostensibly rid him of his rang blood, Bauro's sister, Tokatake's mother, had not done the same. Meanwhile, Tokatake's father was of the lowest landed class (aomata).) The movement failed to depose Tekinaiti.

In 1948, R. G. Roberts, a British colonial officer, visited Abemama. He commented on the contemporary state of the historical social classes, which Baiteke, Tekinaiti's great-great-grandfather, had divided his chiefdom into. Because most people had ancestors of both high and low birth, there was a stigma on the discussion of class differences. Even Tekinaiti, who had a paternal great-great-grandmother from the rang (landless) class, preferred not to speak about the subject. Although the toka (minor chiefs) disliked receiving orders from others—especially those of inferior birth—Roberts found that the open fraternization of the American soldiers with the locals, regardless of class, and the "attitude of the present uea [Tekinaiti] has enabled the lower classes to realize that the days of despotism are past". In addition, he wrote that the people of Kuria and Aranuka, most of whom were of the rang or toro classes, "are [also] awakening to a spirit of independence."

== Later life ==
Tekinaiti moved to the British Solomon Islands in the early 1960s. In the Solomons, Tekinaiti went by George Tekinaiti Tokatake, after his paternal grandfather. After the British administration declared the Phoenix Islands Resettlement Scheme unsustainable in 1963, the Gilbertese settlers, who gave up their land rights at home to colonise the Phoenix Islands, were relocated to Wagina Island in the Solomons. In 1965, PIM's R. W. Robson met George Tokatake, the Assistant Resettlement Officer directing the transfer of the settlers. Robson realised that George was the same person as Tekinaiti, the "handsome young teenage son" of Agnes Murdoch he had met in 1941.

Tekinaiti ran as George Tekinaiti Tokatake in the 1967 Solomon Islands general election, contesting the Ysabel/Russels constituency, but received just 180 (8.0%) of the votes. PIM's Ken McGregor mentioned him in an article published in 1968. McGregor wrote that Tekinaiti, who he referred to as a "high chief", was based on Choiseul Island. In a 1969 article, PIM reported that Bauro ("Paul Tekinaite Tokatake"), Tekinaiti's son, was now the high chief of Abemama. (Note: Bauro is the Gilbertese equivalent of Paul.)

== Ancestry ==
Based on Simon 1960, p. 4, and Roberts 1953, p. 277. Only ancestors named in the sources are included.

Ancestors of Tekinaiti

Tebetinako
Tokatake
Baiteke
Timon
Kantake
Rita
Taeia
Tekinaiti
George McGhee Murdoch
Agnes Murdoch
Takeiti
