= 2024 Kiribati parliamentary election =

- 14 August 2024 (first round); 19 August 2024 (second round)

44 of the 45 seats in the Maneaba ni Maungatabu 23 seats needed for a majority
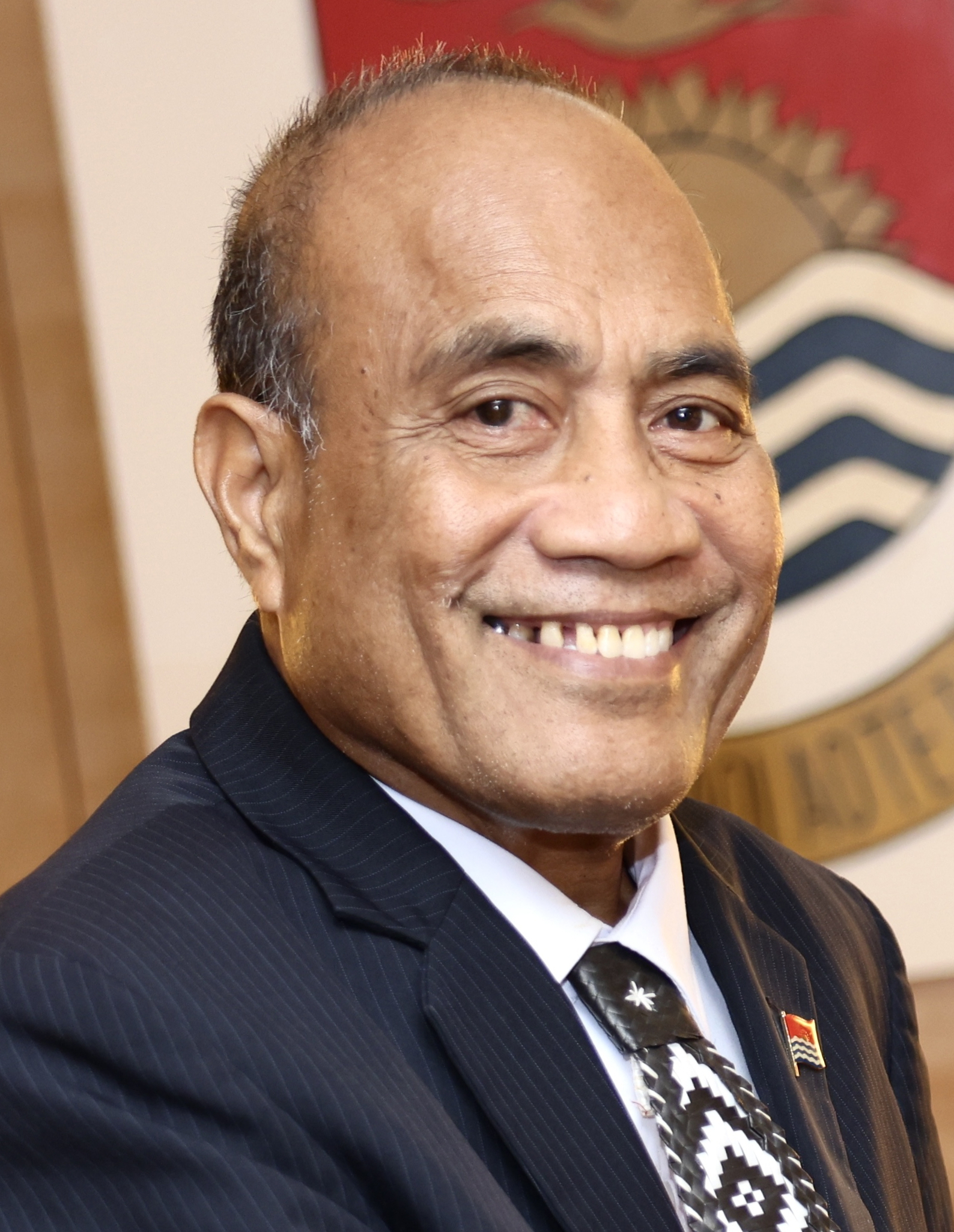

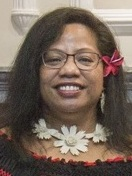
	First party	Second party
Leader	Taneti Maamau	Tessie Lambourne
Party	TKP	BKM
Leader's seat	Onotoa	Abemama
Last election	22	22
Seats won	33	8
Seat change	▲11	▼14
Speaker before election
Tangariki Reete
BKM
Elected Speaker
Willie Tokataake
TKP

Parliamentary elections were held in Kiribati in 2024 to elect members of the Maneaba ni Maungatabu, with the first round held on 14 August and the second on 19 August.

== Electoral system ==
Of the 45 members of the Maneaba ni Maungatabu, 44 are elected in 23 single and multi-member electoral districts (seven with one seat, eleven with two seats, and five with three seats) using a modified two-round system. The 45th member of the legislature is nominated by the Banaban community resident on Rabi Island in Fiji.

A voter has as many votes to cast as the number of seats in their electoral district. In the first round, a candidate is elected if they receive more than 50% of the ballots cast. When not all seats are filled, a second round is held with the number of candidates being equal to the number of seats remaining to be filled plus two, with those who received the fewest votes in the first round being eliminated. In the second round, voters have as many votes to cast as there are vacancies remaining. The top candidates are elected even if they do not receive a majority. A tie in the second round results in a third round of voting.

For the 2024 election, there are nearly 53,000 registered voters.

== Issues ==
Among issues prominent during the election were inflation, rising sea levels, public spending, the national debt, and relations with China. In 2019 Kiribati President Taneti Maamau ended the nation's longstanding diplomatic recognition of Taiwan, instead recognizing the People's Republic of China. This caused a rift within his own government which resulted in the fiercely fought election in 2020. This switch has strained relations between Kiribati and various Pacific nations, as well as Australia, Kiribati's long-time traditional trade partner. This was coupled with Maamau withdrawing Kiribati from the Pacific Islands Forum claiming that the organization was no longer serving Kiribati's interests. Senior opposition figure Banuera Berina, who split from Maamau's Tobwaan Kiribati Party (TKP) due to the Chinese issue, called the nation's relationship with the PRC as "not healthy for the country". Additionally, Rimon Rimon, a local investigative journalist, described the island nation as "a landscape of fear" as Maamau and the TKP have created a political system dominated by personal patronage over party affiliation, where those with close ties to the government find it far easier to win elections due to being allocated government resources.

The Maamau-led government has partnered with the PRC on a series of infrastructure projects to boost the island's fishing and tourism industries, as well as letting the PRC rebuild a World War II-era American airbase on Kanton, roughly halfway between Hawaii and Fiji. In 2021 Maamau abolished the Phoenix Islands Protected Area, opening the area up for more PRC fishing vessels. Opposition candidates have also accused the TKP of being financially backed by the PRC, claiming that the PRC is funneling money into political coffers to prevent a change in the nation's leadership. In an effort to weaken the opposition, in August 2022 Maamau sought to deport High Court justice David Lambourne, husband of Leader of the Opposition Tessie Eria Lambourne. This move was initially blocked by Kiribati’s Court of Appeal. By September 2022 Maamau's attacks on the Judiciary had resulted in the suspension of Chief Justice William Hastings and all Court of Appeal judges, in a move that has been labeled as democratic backsliding and as autocratic.

== Results ==
A total of 114 people ran in the election, of which 18 were women. Out of the 44 seats to be contested, four candidates were declared elected unopposed at the close of nominations on 24 July 2024 - Tinian Reiher and Alexander Teabo from Butaritari, Bootii Nauan from South Tabiteuea and Tekeeua Tarati from Tamana. All four were incumbents, with three (Alexander, Bootii and Tekeeua) being Ministers in the outgoing TKP government.

=== First round ===
By 16 August, the full results for the first round were released, with the outcomes broadcast locally and online by Radio Kiribati. Of the 44 seats, 25 seats were decided and 19 seats (across 12 electoral districts) will require a second round on 19 August. President Taneti Maamau comfortably retained his seat in Onotoa. Six members lost their seats, including Minister for Infrastructure and Sustainable Energy, Willie Tokataake in Abemama. Three women were elected, including Leader of the Opposition in the last Parliament, Tessie Eria Lambourne, in Abemama. Seven women will contest the second round in five electoral districts (Arorae, Betio, Fanning (Tabuaeran), North Tabiteuea and Tarawa Teinainano). If voting trends from the first round continue through to the second round, Kiribati could have as many as seven women in the new Parliament, which would be a record number. Late on 15 August the Ministry of Culture and Internal Affairs (under which the Electoral Commission sits) published official results for the first round elections in all but the Tarawa Teinainano electoral district. On 17 August the Office of the President published a full list of the results on its official Facebook page.

=== Second round ===
Voting commenced at 7:00am and continued until 6:00pm. All results had been declared by 1:30pm in Tarawa on 20 August. Eight more members lost their seats, including Minister for Culture and Internal Affairs, Boutu Bateriki in Rural Tarawa, and Minister for Labour and Human Resources Development, Taabeta Amuera Teakai in Tarawa Teinainano. Also unseated was former Vice-President Teima Onorio, who had represented Arorae since 1998. The Speaker of the outgoing Parliament, Tangariki Reete, regained her seat in Betio. 'Father of the House', Ieremia Tabai, was elected to serve his 12th term as one of the two members from Nonouti. For the first time the Parliament will have a husband and wife as members, with Lavinia Teatao Teem from Abaiang and Jacob Teem representing Kiritimati. On 20 August the Ministry of Culture and Internal Affairs published a full list of the results on its official Facebook page.

In summary, 27 members retained their seats. Sixteen members were elected to Parliament for the first time, including three female members. Tangariki Reete returns to Parliament after losing her Betio seat in 2020. A total of five women were elected to the new Parliament, a record for Kiribati. Fourteen members of the outgoing Parliament lost their seats, including three TKP Ministers. With nearly 53,000 registered voters, the first round saw an overall turn-out of 87.14%. The turn-out for the second round was 83.52%.

The new Parliament will sit for the first time on 13 September 2024. After being sworn in, members will elect a new Speaker and determine the candidates for the presidential election. The presidential election is likely to take place in mid-October.

=== By electoral district ===
An asterisk (*) indicates an incumbent Member of the Maneaba ni Maungatabu, while an obelisk (†) indicates a female candidate. The names of the electoral districts are as prescribed in the relevant legislation.

Sources: Office of the President and Ministry of Culture and Internal Affairs

==== Abaiang ====
(3 seats)

Candidate	First round		Second round		Notes
Candidate	Votes	%	Votes	%	Notes
Lavinia Teatao Teem^{†}	1,445	52.83	—N/a		Elected
Teuea Toatu^{*}	1,343	49.10	1,290	48.85	Elected
Betero Atanibora^{*}	1,012	37.00	1,150	43.54	Elected
Kautu Tenaua^{*}	1,080	39.49	1,060	40.14	
Emil Tuuti	635	23.22	613	23.21	
Tokintekai Itimaroroa	100	3.66	—N/a		
Valid ballots	2,733	99.93	2,629	99.55	
Invalid/blank ballots	2	0.07	12	0.45	
Total ballots cast	2,735	100.00	2,641	100.00	
Registered voters/turnout	3,155	86.69	3,155	83.71	

==== Abemama ====
(2 seats)

Candidate	Votes	%	Notes
Tokaibure Rabaua	1,068	56.42	Elected
Tessie Eria Lambourne^{*†}	961	50.77	Elected
Willie Tokataake^{*}	875	46.22	
Valid ballots	1,891	99.89	
Invalid/blank ballots	2	0.11	
Total ballots cast	1,893	100.00	
Registered voters/turnout	2,068	91.54	

==== Aranuka ====
(1 seat)

Candidate	Votes	%	Notes
Martin Moreti^{*}	406	60.87	Elected
Tianeti Ioane	192	28.79	
Toom Namron	68	10.19	
Valid ballots	666	99.85	
Invalid/blank ballots	1	0.15	
Total ballots cast	667	100.00	
Registered voters/turnout	729	91.50	

==== Arorae ====
(1 seat)

Candidate	First round		Second round		Notes
Candidate	Votes	%	Votes	%	Notes
Niiti Itaaka	188	38.29	254	51.42	Elected
Koru Tionee Tebakabo	195	39.71	223	45.14	
Teima Onorio^{*†}	107	21.79	17	3.44	
Valid ballots	490	99.80	494	100.00	
Invalid/blank ballots	1	0.20	0	0.00	
Total ballots cast	491	100.00	494	100.00	
Registered voters/turnout	522	94.06	522	94.64	

==== Banaba ====
(1 seat)

Candidate	Votes	%	Notes
Tibanga Taratai^{*}	143	70.44	Elected
Pelenise Alofa Maike Pilitati^{†}	60	29.56	
Valid ballots	203	100.00	
Invalid/blank ballots	0	0.00	
Total ballots cast	203	100.00	
Registered voters/turnout	219	92.69	

==== Beru ====
(2 seats)

Candidate	Votes	%	Notes
England Thomas Iuta^{*}	641	55.31	Elected
Tawaria Komwenga	603	52.03	Elected
Bwatoromaio Kiritian^{*}	393	33.91	
Tetabo Nakara	350	30.20	
Valid ballots	1,159	100.00	
Invalid/blank ballots	0	0.00	
Total ballots cast	1,159	100.00	
Registered voters/turnout	1,190	97.39	

==== Betio ====
(3 seats)

Candidate	First round		Second round		Notes
Candidate	Votes	%	Votes	%	Notes
Tangariki Reete^{†}	3,203	48.65	2,780	42.84	Elected
Choy Freddy	2,300	34.93	2,641	40.69	Elected
Tinte Itinteang^{*}	2,276	34.57	2,602	40.09	Elected
Kataaua Benjamin^{†}	2,526	38.37	2,509	38.66	
Tebao Awerika^{*}	1,774	26.94	1,848	28.47	
Botika Maitinnara^{†}	1,546	23.48	—N/a		
Tirikai Tiraim	262	3.98	—N/a		
Valid ballots	6,580	99.94	6,487	99.95	
Invalid/blank ballots	4	0.06	3	0.05	
Total ballots cast	6,584	100.00	6,490	100.00	
Registered voters/turnout	7,808	84.32	7,808	83.12	

==== Butaritari ====
(2 seats)

Candidate	Notes
Alexander Teabo^{*}	Elected unopposed
Tinian Reiher^{*}	Elected unopposed

==== Fanning (Tabuaeran) ====
(2 seats)

Candidate	First round		Second round		Notes
Candidate	Votes	%	Votes	%	Notes
Kaotitaake Kokoria	665	63.09	—N/a		Elected
Matanga Aran	491	46.58	693	66.25	Elected
Arawaia Tiira Redfern	150	14.23	190	18.16	
Rubeiti Eria^{†}	290	27.51	161	15.39	
Marouea Kamraratu	109	10.34	—N/a		
Tewaaki Kobae^{*}	101	9.58	—N/a		
Teraawati Kinta	50	4.74	—N/a		
Valid ballots	1,054	100.00	1,044	99.81	
Invalid/blank ballots	0	0.00	2	0.19	
Total ballots cast	1,054	100.00	1,046	100.00	
Registered voters/turnout	1,099	95.91	1,099	95.18	

==== Kiritimati (includes Kanton) ====
(3 seats)

Candidate	First round		Second round		Notes
Candidate	Votes	%	Votes	%	Notes
Mikarite Temari^{*}	2,157	60.79	—N/a		Elected
Teribwa Taabe	1,738	48.99	1,843	54.54	Elected
Jacob Teem^{*}	1,640	46.22	1,594	47.17	Elected
Bakaia Kiabo^{*}	958	27.00	1151	34.06	
Kataebati Bwataua	361	10.17	788	23.32	
Rabaere Matai	236	6.65	—N/a		
Kaitibo Timon	204	5.75	—N/a		
Kaitama Toroto	154	4.34	—N/a		
Valid ballots	3,544	99.89	3,354	99.26	
Invalid/blank ballots	4	0.11	25	0.74	
Total ballots cast	3,548	100.00	3,379	100.00	
Registered voters/turnout	3,835	92.52	3,835	88.11	

==== Kuria ====
(1 seat)

Candidate	First round		Second round		Notes
Candidate	Votes	%	Votes	%	Notes
Banuera Berina^{*}	283	44.15	325	50.47	Elected
Tom Murdoch	260	40.56	314	48.76	
Moote Kabure	93	14.51	0	0.00	Withdrew
Valid ballots	636	99.22	639	99.22	
Invalid/blank ballots	5	0.78	5	0.78	
Total ballots cast	641	100.00	644	100.00	
Registered voters/turnout	678	94.54	678	94.99	

==== Maiana ====
(2 seats)

Candidate	Votes	%	Notes
Ruta Teretia Babo^{†}	663	56.28	Elected
Koraubati Remuera^{*}	595	50.51	Elected
David Collins	456	38.71	
Vincent Tong^{*}	323	27.42	
Valid ballots	1,178	100.00	
Invalid/blank ballots	0	0.00	
Total ballots cast	1,178	100.00	
Registered voters/turnout	1,251	94.16	

==== Makin ====
(2 seats)

Candidate	Votes	%	Notes
Pinto Katia^{*}	632	63.52	Elected
Auria Kitina	626	62.91	Elected
James Taom^{*}	316	31.76	
Bwaaio Borauea	90	9.05	
Karea Paul Chen Baireti	69	6.93	
Valid ballots	994	99.90	
Invalid/blank ballots	1	0.10	
Total ballots cast	995	100.00	
Registered voters/turnout	1,098	90.62	

==== Marakei ====
(2 seats)

Candidate	First round		Second round		Notes
Candidate	Votes	%	Votes	%	Notes
Ruateki Tekaiara^{*}	824	59.80	—N/a		Elected
Moannata Ientaake^{*}	679	49.27	773	56.59	Elected
Burentoun Atanrika	424	30.77	386	28.26	
Tokantekai Bakineti	261	18.94	204	14.93	
Atunuea Tiree	104	7.55	—N/a		
Valid ballots	1,378	100.00	1,363	99.78	
Invalid/blank ballots	0	0.00	3	0.22	
Total ballots cast	1,378	100.00	1,366	100.00	
Registered voters/turnout	1,512	91.14	1,512	90.34	

==== Nikunau ====
(2 seats)

Candidate	Votes	%	Notes
Ribanataake Tiwau^{*}	821	75.11	Elected
Tauanei Marea^{*}	623	57.00	Elected
Taitii Waitie	399	36.51	
Joshua Tinga	143	13.08	
Valid ballots	1,092	99.91	
Invalid/blank ballots	1	0.09	
Total ballots cast	1,093	100.00	
Registered voters/turnout	1,128	96.90	

==== Nonouti ====
(2 seats)

Candidate	First round		Second round		Notes
Candidate	Votes	%	Votes	%	Notes
Dennis Waysang	782	56.02	—N/a		Elected
Ieremia Tabai^{*}	592	42.41	570	43.02	Elected
Atanteora Beiatau	471	33.74	493	37.21	
Karuaki Maritino Matia	243	17.41	255	19.25	
Miriah Waysang Kum Kee^{†}	194	13.90	—N/a		
Valid ballots	1,396	100.00	1,318	99.47	
Invalid/blank ballots	0	0.00	7	0.53	
Total ballots cast	1,396	100.00	1,325	100	
Registered voters/turnout	1,482	94.20	1,482	89.41	

==== North Tabiteuea ====
(2 seats)

Candidate	First round		Second round		Notes
Candidate	Votes	%	Votes	%	Notes
Taberannang Timeon^{*}	1,084	59.17	—N/a		Elected
Tarakabu Martin Tofinga^{*}	814	44.43	958	52.44	Elected
Ruria Iteraera^{†}	500	27.29	762	41.71	
Teabi Tekeaa	321	17.52	103	5.64	
Taoing Teaiwa Taoaba^{†}	73	3.98	—N/a		
Bwereti Teriakai	25	1.36	—N/a		
Valid ballots	1,824	99.56	1,824	99.78	
Invalid/blank ballots	8	0.44	3	0.22	
Total ballots cast	1,832	100.00	1,827	100.00	
Registered voters/turnout	1,992	91.97	1,992	91.72	

==== Onotoa ====
(2 seats)

Candidate	First round		Second round		Notes
Candidate	Votes	%	Votes	%	Notes
Taneti Maamau^{*}	688	82.79	—N/a		Elected
Riteta Iorome	313	37.67	367	44.11	Elected
Taiaki Irata^{*}	281	33.81	360	43.27	
Baraniko Eromanga	146	17.57	101	12.14	
Kouraiti Beniato	75	9.03	—N/a		
Valid ballots	829	99.76	828	99.52	
Invalid/blank ballots	2	0.24	4	0.48	
Total ballots cast	831	100.00	832	100.00	
Registered voters/turnout	877	94.75	877	94.41	

==== Rural Tarawa (North Tarawa) ====
(3 seats)

Candidate	First round		Second round		Notes
Candidate	Votes	%	Votes	%	Notes
Harry Tekaiti^{*}	1,826	50.33	—N/a		Elected
Terieta Mwemwenikeaki^{*}	1,612	44.43	1,843	51.02	Elected
Tonganibeia Buraieta Koakoa	1,757	48.43	1,820	50.39	Elected
Boutu Bateriki^{*}	1,243	34.26	1,405	38.90	
Atarake T Natara	425	11.71	147	4.07	
Valid ballots	3,621	99.81	3,578	99.04	
Invalid/blank ballots	7	0.19	34	0.96	
Total ballots cast	3,628	100.00	3,612	100.00	
Registered voters/turnout	4,155	87.32	4,155	86.93	

==== South Tabiteuea ====
(1 seat)

Candidate	Notes
Bootii Nauan^{*}	Elected unopposed

==== Tamana ====
(1 seat)

Candidate	Notes
Tekeeua Tarati^{*}	Elected unopposed

==== Tarawa Teinainano (South Tarawa) ====
(3 seats)

Candidate	First round		Second round		Notes
Candidate	Votes	%	Votes	%	Notes
Birimaka Tekanene	3,211	25.48	5,670	46.97	Elected
Tebuai Uaai^{*}	3,689	29.27	4,709	39.01	Elected
Ruth Maryanne Cross Kwansing^{†}	3,410	27.06	4,667	38.66	Elected
Taabeta Amuera Teakai^{*†}	3,227	25.61	4,587	38.00	
Taoaba Kaiea^{*}	2,816	22.35	3,817	31.62	
Harry Tong	2,626	20.84	—N/a		
Ngaina Roniti Teiwaki^{†}	1,104	8.76	—N/a		
Natan Teewe	1,019	8.09	—N/a		
Ruatu Titaake	982	7.79	—N/a		
Akineti Moataake^{†}	918	7.28	—N/a		
Tekeeua Kauongo	566	4.49	—N/a		
Baantarawa Ietimeta	546	4.33	—N/a		
Terabwena Taomati	546	4.33	—N/a		
Taabia Kabaua	507	4.02	—N/a		
Kairao Bauea	349	2.77	—N/a		
Ioane Kireon	311	2.47	—N/a		
Kaiboia Ubaitoi	204	1.62	—N/a		
Brock Neti	197	1.56	—N/a		
Beniera Kaitia	161	1.28	—N/a		
Erimeta Barako^{†}	149	1.18	—N/a		
Ramanibina Titau^{†}	110	0.87	—N/a		
Teweti Toare	109	0.86	—N/a		
Valid ballots	12,591	99.91	12,069	99.98	
Invalid/blank ballots	11	0.09	3	0.02	
Total ballots cast	12,602	100.00	12,072	100.00	
Registered voters/turnout	15,661	80.47	15,661	77.08	

==== Washington (Teraina) ====
(1 seat)

Candidate	Votes	%	Notes
Bautaake Beia	536	63.06	Elected
Tione Teraoi Moy	160	18.82	
Nantongo Timeon^{*}	149	17.53	
Valid ballots	752	88.47	
Invalid/blank ballots	98	11.53	
Total ballots cast	850	100.00	
Registered voters/turnout	903	94.13	

== Aftermath ==
On 22 August, the Ministry of Foreign Affairs and Immigration announced that all scheduled diplomatic visits to the country were to be suspended or cancelled until 2025, citing concerns over their effect on the formation of a new government after the election and inability to accommodate visitors while the process was ongoing.

With the ruling Tobwaan Kiribati Party having won 33 of 45 seats, it was able to block the nomination of opposition candidates for president. The TKP nominated incumbent president Taneti Maamau, alongside others described as "dummy candidates." Maamau is expected to retain his position. Opposition leader Tessie Lambourne decried the move, saying "Kiribati is now a one-party state." The presidential election is scheduled for 25 October.
