= Tokatake =

Chief in the Gilbert Islands (c.1899–1935)

Uea of Abemama, Kuria and Aranuka
- Reign: c. 1905 – 1935
- Predecessor: Bauro (Paul)
- Successor: Tekinaiti
- Born: c. 1899
- Died: 1935
- Spouse: Akineti (Agnes Murdoch)
- Children: Tekinaiti; Binatake; Taonamaina (Molly); Tiare (Charles); Tiaon (John)
- Father: Tebetinako
- Mother: Rita

Tokatake (c. 1899 – 1935), also spelled as Tokataake, was the sixth high chief (uea) of Abemama, Kuria and Aranuka in the Gilbert Islands (in modern-day Kiribati). He was the eldest child of Rita, the daughter of a member of the chiefly family (ba n uea) and a woman from the landless class (rang), and Tebetinako, a landed commoner (aomata). He inherited the title of high chief from Bauro, the elder brother of Rita, who died without issue between 1903 and 1908. Bauro was regnant when the British annexed the Gilbert Islands in 1892, and his office held no legal power by 1907.

In 1908, George Murdoch, a Scotsman who owned a trading post and land on Kuria, arranged the marriage of his half-Gilbertese daughter, Agnes (Akineti), to Tokatake. The couple had four sons and a daughter. The eldest, Tekinaiti, succeeded Tokatake as high chief after his death in 1935. Another son, Binatake, entered politics. Bauro, Tekinaiti's successor, and Willie Tokataake, speaker of the House of Assembly, are his grandsons.

== Background ==
Baiteke was the third uea (high chief) of Abemama, Kuria and Aranuka in the Gilbert Islands (now Kiribati). (Note: According to H. E. Maude, Karotu was recognised as the first uea (high chief) of Abemama, Kuria and Aranuka. Airam Teeko, a cousin of Bauro, said the same thing in his history of Abemama, which was a source cited by Maude. Karotu was followed by Tewaia and Baiteke. In contrast to Maude and Teeko, R. G. Roberts, who Maude also cited, wrote that Karotu was not given the title of uea but inherited the title of mataniwi-iaon-te-aba (lit. 'master-over-the-land'). It was Tewaia who was the first uea, making Baiteke the second uea and not the third. Roberts published his investigation of the oral tradition on the dynasty of Abemama in 1953, after sojourning there in 1948.) He divided his chiefdom into several social classes. The ba n uea or utu n uea, which included uea and their children, were at the top of the social hierarchy. The uea could promote unimane (old men) to become minor chiefs, known as inaomata or toka, a status passed on to their children. The aomata also owned land, but were less wealthy and distinguished. Beneath them were landless freeman, who were known as rang, and serfs, who were known as toro or kaunga. (Note: In 1972, five unimane (old men) on Abemama disagreed on whether rang and toro, who were both landless, were separate classes.)

Baiteke was succeeded by Binoka, his eldest child. When it became clear that Binoka would not sire any heirs, he adopted Bauro, the son of his brother Timon and his wife Taiea of the rang class. At the adoption ceremony, Binoka cut Bauro's feet, releasing his rang blood. Fearing that the nobles might reject the validity of the ceremony, he compelled them to smear the rang blood on their foreheads, introducing the inferior blood to their bodies. This act abolished official divisions between classes.

Binoka died in 1891, and was succeeded by Bauro. The Gilbert Islands were annexed into the British Empire in 1892, leading to the decline of the power of the uea in favour of magistrates. By 1907, the office of uea was reported to be abolished in the British-backed Native Governments where it had been present. However, the uea retained some authority in a customary context, and chiefly families remained influential, both working and competing with the Native Governments.

== Life ==
Tokatake customarily ruled Abemama, Kuria and Aranuka, in the Gilbert Islands.

Tokatake was born c. 1899. (Note: According to the Murdochs' genealogist John Horwood, Tokatake was "some thirteen years" younger than Agnes Murdoch. Horwood states that Agnes was born in 1886. In an article on her father's life, the Pacific Islands Monthly's Ken McGregor wrote that she was born the year prior.) The Gilbertese word tokatake means "a high chief, grand personage, [or] rich property owner". He was the first child of Rita, the younger sister of Bauro, and Tebetinako, who Rita married during the reign of her brother. Rita did not undergo the same ceremony as Bauro and had both ba n uea and rang blood, while Tebetinako was of aomata descent. Tokatake had a younger brother named Tabere.

Although R. G. Roberts described his reign as "short", Bauro was still incumbent in 1903. When Tokatake married Agnes Murdoch in or shortly after 1908, (Note: Horwood dates the marriage later than McGregor, to the mid-1910s, and describes Tokatake as a "man" rather than a boy. He also makes no mention of Tokatake being the uea.) Bauro had died without issue and Tokatake was now reigning as an "illiterate despot". (Note: It is unclear how Bauro could have written Simon 1916, but that source had been hand-copied by John R. Tokatake in 1960.) Agnes (Akineti) was the half-Gilbertese daughter of George Murdoch, a Scot who owned a trading post and a small estate on Kuria. Traders often married their Euronesian children, who were held in high regard in the Gilbert Islands, to wealthy local families.

== Legacy ==
Tokatake and Agnes had five children: Tekinaiti, Binatake, Taonamaina, Tiare, and Tiaon. (Note: Taonamaina, Tiare, and Tiaon are also known, respectively, as Molly, Charles, and John.) Tokatake died in 1935. Because Tekinaiti, Tokatake's eldest child, was deemed too young to reign, Tabere, Tokatake's brother, served as Tekinaiti's regent. By 1941, Tabere had died as well and Tekinaiti had become uea. Agnes survived Tokatake and died in 1951.

Paul Binatake Tokatake, the second child of Tekinaiti and Agnes, became an Assistant Administrative Officer of the Gilbert and Ellice Islands in 1950. In 1953, Binatake represented the Colony at the coronation of Elizabeth II in London. It was his first time overseas, and his account of the ceremonies upon his return reportedly "caused incredulous amazement." In 1971, Binatake was elected to the Legislative Council as the member for Kuria. A motion he proposed, based on the pre-colonial custom of compensating murder victims with a good piece of land (te nenebo), did not receive much support, although the concept of traditional customs informing the legal system had sympathisers. The main deficiency in the proposal was that te nenebo would have been awarded regardless of whether or not the defendant had been proven guilty.

Tekinaiti had a son, Bauro Tokatake, who became uea in the 1960s. His son, Don, succeeded him in 2003. Don's brother, the politician Willie Tokataake, is the speaker of the House of Assembly of Kiribati.

== Ancestry ==
From Simon 1960, p. 1.

Ancestors of Tokatake

Tebetinako
Tokatake
Baiteke
Timon
Kantake
Rita
Taeia
