= Maiana (constituency) =

Parliamentary constituency

- Multi-member constituency for the House of Assembly of Kiribati
- Region: Maiana Atoll

Current constituency
- Created: 1979

Maiana is a parliamentary constituency electing two representatives to the House of Assembly of Kiribati. It encompasses the atoll of the same name in the Gilbert Islands.

The Maiana constituency has existed since the First Parliament in 1979. At that time, it elected only one representative. Its inaugural MP was Bwebwetake Areieta.

It was the constituency of the former President of Kiribati, Anote Tong.

== Members of Parliament by year ==
The following MPs have represented Maiana in the House of Assembly, since the seat was created in 1979.

Election	MPs
1967	Tem Jacob
1971	Bwebwetake Areieta
1974	Bwebwetake Areieta
1978	Bwebwetake Areieta
1980 (by-election)	
1982	Rotaria Ataia
1983	Ioteba Tamuera
1987	Terakoro Ruaia
1991	Rotaria Ataia
1994	Remuera Tateraka
1998	Anote Tong and Moteti Kakoroa
2003	Anote Tong and Teiwaki Areieta
2007	Anote Tong and Teiwaki Areieta
