= 1974 Ellice Islands self-determination referendum =

Referendum which split Tuvalu away from Kiribati

July–September 1974
- [_] The establishment of a separate Ellice Islands Colony. [_] To remain with the Gilberts as part of the GEIC and what the colony becomes when its status is altered.

Results
Choice	Votes	%
Separate Ellice Islands Colony	3,799	92.84%
Remain in the GEIC	293	7.16%
Valid votes	4,092	99.03%
Invalid or blank votes	40	0.97%
Total votes	4,132	100.00%
Registered voters/turnout	4,676	88.37%

A referendum on separating from the Gilbert Islands was held in the Ellice Islands (then administered together as the Gilbert and Ellice Islands) between July and September 1974. A rolling ballot was used, starting in July in Tarawa in the Gilbert Islands before being taken to each resident of the Ellice Islands.

The result was 93% of voters in favour of separation, with a voter turnout of 88%. In October the following year the islands were officially separated, and four years after the referendum, the islands became the independent nation of Tuvalu, whilst the Gilbert Islands became Kiribati.

== Background ==
Following objections to self-government for the Gilbert and Ellice Islands from the eight representatives of the Ellice Islands due to concerns about the Gilbert Islands being the dominant part of the territory, an inquiry was held by the British representative Leslie Monson. Following the inquiry, the British government granted the referendum. Proposals for a federal system that would lessen concerns about Gilbertese domination were rejected by GEIC Leader of Government Business Reuben Uatioa, founder of the Gilbertese National Party, who stated "it is either secession or the present type of unitary government."

Prior to the referendum, the British government stated that if separation were to happen, the Ellice Islands would not receive any share of the Gilberts' phosphate revenues from Ocean Island and that the assets of the GEIC outside the Ellice Islands would remain the property of the Gilbert Islands. However, separation was still supported by all prominent Ellice Islands politicians except Isakala Paeniu, a government minister.

== Results ==
The ballot paper had two options:

1. The establishment of a separate Ellice Islands Colony
2. To remain with the Gilberts as part of the GEIC and what the colony becomes when its status is altered.

Choice	Votes	%
Establishment of a separate colony	3,799	92.84
Remain part of the GEIC	293	7.16
Total	4,092	100.00
Valid votes	4,092	99.03
Invalid/blank votes	40	0.97
Total votes	4,132	100.00
Registered voters/turnout	4,676	88.37
Source: Nohlen et al.

== Reactions ==
After the results were announced, Chief Minister Naboua Ratieta stated "Personally I am sorry they have decided to separate from us. After all, we have been friends for a long time, and so far as my administration is concerned, there would have been no question whatever of any political domination of the Ellice people by the Gilbertese". Paeniu said "I'm sorry to find there are only 200-odd sensible Ellice Islanders. They are, perhaps, the only people who voted with full knowledge of the tough implications of the whole issue... I'm sorry to say that the Ellice leaders, who advocate separation, have not come to grips with the real problems facing small, almost unknown communities in the world today."
