= 1967 Gilbert and Ellice Islands general election =

General elections were held in the Gilbert and Ellice Islands in 1967. All candidates ran as independents.

== Background ==
Earlier in the year the British government promulgated a new constitution for the islands, creating a House of Representatives to replace the Advisory Council. The new House of Representatives had 30 members, of which 23 were elected (19 from the Gilberts and four from Ellice Islands), five civil servants and two ex officio members.

In addition, the Executive Council was replaced with a Governing Council, to consist of five members of the House of Representatives (elected by the House) and two ex officio members.

== Results ==
Only three of the ten members of the former Advisory Council that contested the elections were elected.

Constituency	Elected member
Abaiang	Kabiriera Kararaua
Abaiang	Tuari Bokarawa
Abemama	Tekinene Tetabo
Aranuka and Kuria	Inatio Binoka
Arorae	Tetebano Aram
Beru	Otiuea Tanentoa
Butaritari	Mareko Ioteba
Maiana	Tem Jacob
Makin	Mote Tiotake
Marakei	Buren Ratieta
Nikunau	Akabo Ebarata
Nonouti	Kaitara Metai
Northern Ellice	Founuku Tipelu
Northern Ellice	Sione Tui Kleis
Onotoa	Babera Kirata
Southern Ellice	Melitiana Kaisami
Southern Ellice	Iosia Taomia
Tabiteuea	Nation Bwenawa
Tabiteuea	Gilbert Lamusse
Tamana	Ioteba Tamuera Uriam
Tarawa Rural	Ioteba Kirieta
Urban Tarawa	Edward Martin
Urban Tarawa	Reuben Uatioa
Source: Pacific Islands Monthly

=== Official members ===
Position	Member
Assistant Resident Commissioner	D.G. Cudmore
Assistant Secretary, Personnel	J.B. McCaig
Attorney General	C.P. North-Coombes
Chief Medical Officer	E.P. Hamblett
Commissioner of Works	D.S. Short
Marine Superintendent	G.W. Sharp
Senior Assistant Secretary, Finance	M.D. Allen
Source: Pacific Islands Monthly

== Aftermath ==
The new House of Representatives was opened by Resident Commissioner Val Andersen on 8 December 1967. Reuben Uatioa, who founded the Gilbertese National Party in 1965, was elected Chief Elected Member. A Governing Council was formed, consisting of four official members (M.D. Allen, D.G. Cudmore, E.P. Hamblett, C.P. North-Coombes) and five elected members (Uatioa, Edward Martin, Buren Ratieta, Iosia Taomia and Ioteba Tamuera Uriam).

A by-election was held for the Marakei seat in September 1968, which was won by Naboua Ratieta, the brother of the former incumbent Buren Ratieta.
