= 1974 Gilbert and Ellice Islands general election =

General elections were held in the Gilbert and Ellice Islands on 4 April 1974. All candidates ran as independents.

== Background ==
The system of government was changed again prior to the 1974 elections; the Gilbert and Ellice Islands Order 1974 replaced the Legislative Council with a 31-member House of Assembly, including 28 elected members and three ex officio members. A Council of Ministers replaced the Executive Council, and consisted of the Chief Minister elected by the House of Assembly and six ministers. Only around 60% of people eligible to vote registered to do so.

== Results ==
Leader of Government business, Reuben Uatioa, who had been favourite to become the first Chief Minister was defeated by Abete Merang in Urban Tarawa. Voter turnout was around 70%.

== Aftermath ==
Following the elections, Naboua Ratieta was appointed Chief Minister. Ratieta appointed a six-member cabinet, including Ellice Islanders Sione Tui Kleis as Minister for Commerce and Industry and Isakala Paeniu as Minister for Natural Resources. Bwebwetake Areieta became Minister of Communications, Works and Utilities, Tekarei Russell was Minister of Health and Welfare, Roniti Teiwaki was Minister of Education, Training and Culture, Ibeata Tonganibeia was Minister of State and Teweai Uaruta was Minister of Local Government and Rural Development. Uatioa was appointed Speaker. Toaripi Lauti was considered to be the Leader of the Opposition.

When the Ellice Islands separated following a referendum later in 1974, the eight seats representing the Ellice Islands were abolished. Otiuea Tanentoa replaced Kleis as Minister for Commerce and Industry.
