= Captain Jimmy Smith =

- Born: James Alfred Smith c. 1859; Liverpool, England
- Died: 1 December 1945 (aged 86); Sigatoka, Colony of Fiji
- Occupations: Trader; merchant seaman
- Children: 8
- Relatives: Tekinaiti (son-in-law)

James Alfred Smith (c. 1859 – 1 December 1945) was an English merchant seaman and a resident trader in the Gilbert Islands, where he became a well-known personality. Born in Liverpool, Smith qualified to command a ship at a young age. He was active on American schooners in the Northeast Pacific, sailing out from San Francisco and Honolulu, before settling down in the Gilbert Islands. After living on Nikunau, Smith bought land on Abemama when he was 36 and became the father-in-law of its high chief, Tekinaiti. During World War II, Smith was one of the few foreigners to survive the Japanese occupation of the Gilbert Islands. He died while visiting his son in Sigatoka, Fiji, at the age of 86.

== Biography ==
Born in Liverpool, James Alfred Smith took to the sea as a boy and became a qualified captain when he was still a young man. Smith first saw the Pacific Ocean while serving as the master of various ships. He was active on American schooners in the Northeast Pacific, sailing out from San Francisco and Honolulu, before settling down in the Gilbert Islands as a trader. He was a well-read man who had met the writers Robert Louis Stevenson and Louis Becke, and whose library contained a breadth of material on the Pacific.

After living on Nikunau, Smith bought land on Abemama and moved there when he was 36—in about 1895. He married a woman variously described as Gilbertese, Nauruan, or the daughter of an American father and a Samoan mother. Smith had four sons and four daughters with her. One of his daughters married Tekinaiti, the 16-year-old high chief of Abemama, Kuria and Aranuka. The Resident Commissioner of the Gilbert and Ellice Islands gave her a gold wristwatch as a wedding gift.

=== World War II ===
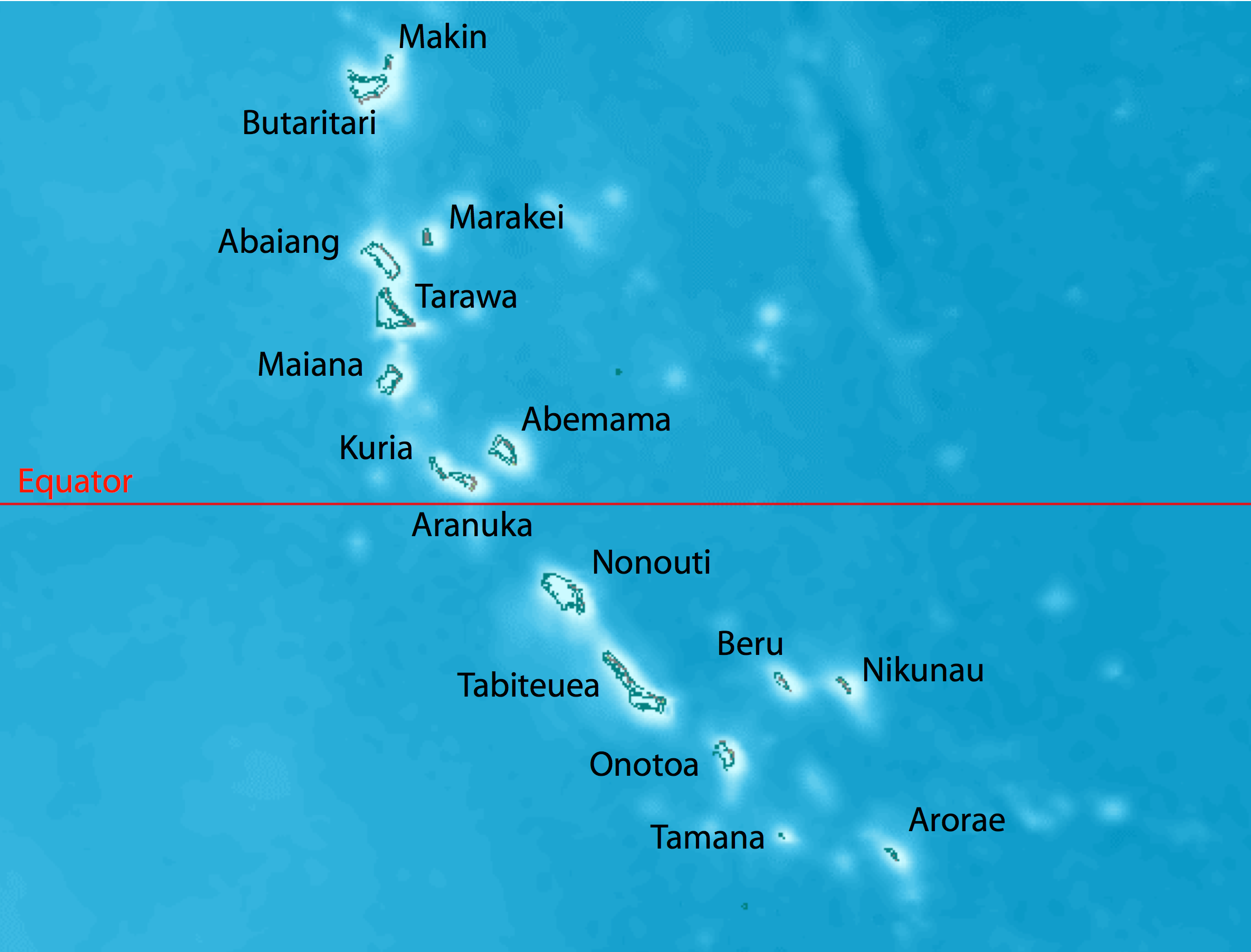
Smith was one of the only foreigners to survive the Japanese occupation of the Gilbert Islands during World War II.

Smith was one of the only foreigners to survive the Japanese occupation of the Gilbert Islands. The occupation began on Butaritari in December 1941. Most foreigners evacuated the Gilbert Islands before the occupation extended south. When the Japanese first called at Abemama, all of the New Zealand soldiers stationed there were taken away and executed. Smith later wrote: "It was only because the Jap doctor and the head officer said I was too old to be of any harm that I was not taken away with them." Smith claimed that some Japanese soldiers who arrived later on asked permission from Tarawa to behead him, but it never came. The Japanese visited him almost every day. When Smith saw them carrying away his daughter's watch, Smith clung to it in "a tug-of-war"; somehow, he was not killed and allowed to keep it.

The Americans liberated Abemama in 1943, and Smith said that the American soldiers stationed there were "very kind" to him. In June 1944, he received permission from the Americans to leave Abemama and go to Sigatoka, Fiji, to live with his son, William Smith. He wrote: "what I needed mostly was a change [...] I was suffering from the lack of food I had to put up with during the Jap occupation, and I am still feeling the effect of it."

On 1 December 1945, James Alfred Smith died in Sigatoka at the age of 86. In his obituary, Pacific Islands Monthly described him as "one of the famous old sea-dogs who made history in the Central Pacific in the latter end of the last century, and his death severs one of the last remaining links of that period."
