= Bauro =

Bauro may be,

- Bauro language
- Tommy Bauro
- Bauro Roco forest, Timor-Leste
- Bauro, Lospalos, Lautém Municipality, Timor-Leste
- Bauro Tokatake, Gilbertese/I-Kiribati landowner and politician who served as the seventh uea of Abemama, Kuria, and Aranuka in the Gilbert Islands/Kiribati (after 1979)
