= Lavinia Teatao Teem =

I-Kiribati businesswoman and politician

Member of the House of Assembly
- Incumbent
- Assumed office 13 September 2024
- Constituency: Abaiang

Personal details
- Party: Independent
- Spouse: Jacob Teem
- Parent: Teatao Teannaki (father)
- Occupation: Politician; Businesswoman

Lavinia Teatao Teem is an I-Kiribati businesswoman and politician. She is member of the House of Assembly of Kiribati since 2024.

== Career ==
Lavinia is the daughter of former president of Kiribati Teatao Teannaki. She have a professional career in business and has worked on issues relating to gender equality and social inclusion.

She stood in the 2024 parliamentary elections and was elected to represent Abaiang with four other women, this marked the highest number of female MPs in the country’s history. The others were Ruth Cross Kwansing, Ruta Teretia Babo, Tangariki Reete and former opposition leader Tessie Eria Lambourne. She received 1,445 votes. Lavinia is the wife of Jacob Teem; they became the first married couple to be elected as MPs.
