= Ruta Teretia Babo =

I-Kiribati politician (born 1989 or 1989)

Deputy Speaker of the House of Assembly of Kiribati
- Incumbent
- Assumed office 13 September 2024
- Preceded by: Ioteba Redfern
- Speaker: Willie Tokataake

Personal details
- Born: 1988 or 1989
- Party: Tobwaan Kiribati Party
- Occupation: Politician

Ruta Teretia Babo-Nemta (born 1988 or 1989) is an I-Kiribati politician and civil servant. She has been serving as the first woman Deputy Speaker of the House of Assembly of Kiribati since 2024. She is also the first woman elected to represent the island of Maiana at the House of Assembly.

== Career ==
Ruta was born in 1988 or 1989 as the daughter of politician Kaure Nemta, who served as member of the House of Assembly of Kiribati between 2016 and 2020. Before entering politics, she worked as a civil servant and said that her father had been her inspiration to get started.

In 2023 Ruta participated in the Kiribati Women’s Practice Parliament. She stood in the 2024 parliamentary elections for the ruling Tobwaan Kiribati Party and was elected as the first woman to represent Maiana – the same constituency as her father – as well as the youngest MP; together with four other women, this marked the highest number of female MPs in the country’s history. The others were Ruth Cross Kwansing, Lavinia Teatao Teem, Tangariki Reete and former opposition leader Tessie Eria Lambourne. She received 663 votes, the 56.28%. Following the election of the Speaker on 13 September 2024, Ruta became the first woman to be elected Deputy Speaker.

Ruta is member of the regional Women in Power Network. She has advocated for greater participation of women and younger generations in Pacific politics, and has also highlighted the need to improve infrastructure, transport, medical supplies and educational facilities in Maiana.

== Personal ==
She is mother of four children.
