= Bauro Tokatake =

I-Kiribati politician (1932–2003)

- Bauro, posing with a portrait of Binoka at his tomb (Note: Bauro posed for Bell's camera at the tomb of Tem Binoka, next to Binoka's portrait. The photograph can be found in Bell's book, In Search of Tusitala: Travels in the Pacific After Robert Louis Stevenson (1994). Another photograph of Bauro can be found in PIM 1969, p. 42.)

Uea of Abemama, Kuria and Aranuka
- Predecessor: Tekinaiti
- Successor: Donald Tokatake
- Born: c. 1932
- Died: 2003
- Issue: 5, including Donald and Willie
- Father: Tekinaiti

Bauro Tokatake (c. 1932 – 2003), also known as Paul or George Tokatake, (Note: The Gilbertese language does not have the letters P or L. Bauro is the Gilbertese equivalent of Paul.) (Note: Thurston Clarke, who visited Abemama in 1985, wrote that a George Tokataake was the king at that time.^{:378} This is the same person as Bauro Tokatake; Ray Watters, who visited Abemama in 1972 and 1984, reported that Bauro was incumbent on both occasions,^{:293} and a King Paulo was later reported as having died in 2003. Bauro's father, Tekinaiti, also went by George Murdock, the name of Tekinaiti's maternal grandfather, a European trader.) was an I-Kiribati politician and landowner. He was the king (uea) of Abemama, Kuria and Aranuka in the Gilbert Islands.

Bauro inherited the historic title—a relic from the precolonial-era State of Abemama with no legal basis—from his father, Tekinaiti, in the 1960s. Due to his lineage, he also owned the most land on his home island of Abemama. He received income through copra production, as custom allowed him to ask any of his subjects to come work on his properties, and, more contentiously, by selling off land. Bauro served as President of the Island Council from 1968 to 1977. He represented Abemama on the Legislative Council of the Gilbert and Ellice Islands from 1971 to 1978.

== Life ==
Bauro Tokatake was born c. 1932. (Note: In 1981, Bauro was 49.) His father was Tekinaiti,^{:277} the king (uea) of Abemama, Kuria, and Aranuka. His mother was the daughter of Captain Jimmy Smith, a famous resident trader on Abemama, and his Nauruan wife.^{:274}^{:95} (Note: One source describes Smith's wife as "the daughter of an American father and a Samoan mother".) Bauro once worked as a merchant seaman.^{:378} In the 1960s, his father went to live in the Solomon Islands (Note: A George Tekinaiti Tokatake ran unsuccessfully for the Ysabel/Russels constituency in the 1967 Solomon Islands general election. He received 180 (8.0%) votes.^{:67}) and left Bauro to inherit the kingship. (Note: A Paul Tekinaite Tokatake was high chief by 1969.)

=== Reign ===
Bauro Tokatake was knowledgeable in the history, rights, and responsibilities of the kings of Abemama, which were taught to him by his father, Tekinaiti, and senior elders (unimane).^{:33} However, his royal authority relied on the acceptance of the people, and his powers were much inferior to those of Baiteke and Binoka, the 19th-century autocrats of the Kingdom of Abemama.^{:33} The abolishment of social classes in the 1880s and the British annexation of the Gilbert and Ellice Islands in the 1890s significantly diminished the king's authority. After World War II, colonial officials opposed many customs that they viewed as exploitative, such as the king receiving half the output of copra. After becoming a government employee, Bauro Tokatake abolished the practice because it undermined the system of communal labour the government instituted.^{:33–34}

Though his title was only customary, Bauro retained certain rights: for example, he could ask anyone to cut copra on his land for him; and if he needed labour for a task, such as building a new house, he could ask the elders of each village to send men to work for him for a few days at a time. He also had many responsibilities. He was obliged to help his subjects when they asked for money or to temporarily use his land, in return for their service.^{:34} Many were also free to take whatever they wished from the king, an artefact from the days when the king was considered the owner of everything on the island.^{:385} According to Thurston Clarke, (Note: Thurston Clarke, who visited Abemama in 1985, wrote that a George Tokataake was the king at that time.^{:378} This is the same person as Bauro Tokatake; Ray Watters, who visited Abemama in 1972 and 1984, reported that Bauro was incumbent on both occasions,^{:293} and a King Paulo was later reported as having died in 2003. Bauro's father, Tekinaiti, also went by George Murdock, the name of Tekinaiti's maternal grandfather, a European trader.) Bauro complained that "being a king on Abemama is a bum deal. No power, and people help themselves to whatever you own. No, these days it is better to be a commoner than a king."^{:386}

During the late 1960s and early 1970s, Bauro consolidated his power as a member of the Island Council and the committee of a cooperative society. Bauro was elected to the Legislative Council of the Gilbert and Ellice Islands in 1971. He lost his seat by twenty-five votes in 1978. However, he claimed that his loss stemmed from the people's confusion about multiple-choice voting.^{:378} In addition, Bauro served as President of the Island Council from 1968 to 1977, while his uncle was the Island Executive Officer. During their time, the Council's funds were consistently short each month, and Bauro's uncle asked him to cover the missing money. This ongoing issue led to Bauro's uncle being fired and Bauro resigning from his position.^{:293}

Bauro Tokatake still owned the most land on Abemama. He is said to have once owned over 400 lands, or between a quarter and half of the island,^{:40} which had an estimated land area of 6,861 acres (27.77 km^{2}) in 1971.^{:39} His land ownership helped perpetuate his high status.^{:35} In 1981, Bauro claimed that he ruled only as long as his subjects let him, and that they had not expressed any desire to end the royal line. In 1972, however, Bauro had sold off most of his property,^{:40} and his reputation decreased the more land he let go of. This was because the people of Abemama viewed the excessive sale of land as profligate and considered the king's land not just his property, but land held for the collective benefit of his people.^{:71}^{:266} He now only had 115 lands, or 132 parcels, in the Lands Register,^{:40} or about one-tenth of Abemama.^{:41} In the 1990s, Gavin Bell wrote that the king had become unpopular with some of his neighbors. After Bauro sold a hundred acres, Bell claimed, his house mysteriously burned down; he and his wife were temporarily living in little tin shacks when Bell met them.^{:266} Another travel writer—George Woodcock, who visited Abemama a decade prior—also mentioned that the king had gained an unfavourable reputation from selling his land.^{:174}

When the United Kingdom granted Kiribati independence in 1979, the elders of Abemama penned a letter to Queen Elizabeth II, requesting that Abemama, Kuria, and Aranuka either be made a separate country or remain a British protectorate.^{:380} Bauro told Thurston Clarke that the request was "not based on whim but on history, laws, and our rights! [...] I assure you that most people on these islands would prefer to break away." There was no reply; the letter likely never reached the Queen,^{:380} and Clarke was unable to find a copy.^{:392} Nevertheless, the new government of Kiribati recognized Bauro as king, and officials consulted him on matters affecting the three islands.

== Legacy ==
Abemama, Kuria, and Aranuka, the islands of Kiribati over which Bauro Tokatake nominally ruled

Bauro Tokatake died in 2003. A new village, Bangotantekabaia, (Note: It was first recorded in the 1995 census with a population of 38.) between Tebanga and Kariatebike, was recorded in 2005 with a population of 140, near where Bauro once lived. R. F. Watters suggests that Bauro allowed I-Abemama families to rent some of his land, perhaps cutting copra for the king and fishing in the lagoon, leading to the development of what is now a community of 525 (2020) — the second-largest village on Abemama.^{:297} Bauro's position as uea was inherited by Donald "Don" Tokatake, his eldest son. The position now holds almost no status. In 2014, Don, now an elderly kava bar owner, was asked by an Australian aid worker how it felt to be a king and compared himself to "a dog with no teeth," since the title, he said, was nothing but a word. His brother,^{:376} the politician Willie Tokatake, described Don as "only a figurehead".^{:286}
