= USS Makin Island =

Two ships of the United States Navy have borne the name USS Makin Island, named for Makin Island, target of the U.S. Marine Raiders' raid early in World War II.

- The first USS Makin Island (CVE-93), was a Casablanca-class escort carrier, launched in 1944 and stricken in 1946.
- The second USS Makin Island (LHD-8), is a Wasp-class amphibious assault ship. She was launched on 15 Sep 2006 and was commissioned in October 2009.
