= Ministry of Infrastructure and Sustainable Energy =

Government ministry of Kiribati

The Ministry of Infrastructure and Sustainable Energy (MISE) is a government ministry of Kiribati, as ministry of infrastructure and as ministry of energy, headquartered in South Tarawa.

== Ministers ==
- Ruateki Tekaiara (2016–2020)
- Willie Tokataake (2020–)
