= Ruth Cross Kwansing =

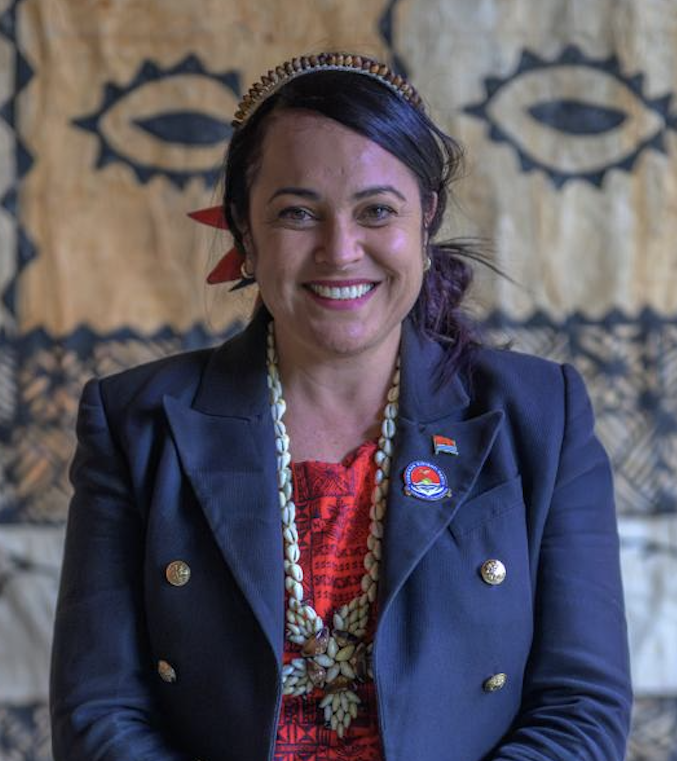
- Kwansing in 2025

Minister for Women, Youth, Sport and Social Affairs
- Incumbent
- Assumed office 2024
- President: Taneti Maamau

Member of the House of Assembly from South Tarawa
- Incumbent
- Assumed office August 2024

Personal details
- Born: 6 April 1979 (age 47) Auckland, New Zealand
- Party: Tobwaan Kiribati Party
- Spouse: Willie H. Kwansing

Ruth Maryanne Cross Kwansing O.M. (born 6 April 1979) is an I-Kiribati politician and community leader who serves as a Member of Parliament for the South Tarawa constituency. Initially elected as an independent candidate in the 2024 election, she subsequently joined the Tobwaan Kiribati Party. In 2024, she was appointed as the Minister of Women, Youth, Sport and Social Affairs by President Taneti Maamau. Prior to her political career, she was awarded the Kiribati Order of Merit in 2021 and was selected as the country's first Obama Foundation Asia-Pacific Leader in 2022.

In addition to her national ministerial portfolio, Cross Kwansing serves regionally through the Pacific Islands Forum (PIF) as the Political Champion for Gender Equality and Social Inclusion (GESI). In April 2026, she successfully led Kiribati's election to the United Nations Commission on the Status of Women for the 2026–2030 term becoming the first Pacific Islander to be elected to the global body.

== Life & Education ==
Cross Kwansing was born in 1979 in Auckland, New Zealand, to an Australian father and an I-Kiribati mother of Tuvaluan descent. She was raised in Kiribati and later attended BYU-Hawaii before relocating to Melbourne, Australia, in 2006, where she lived until returning to Kiribati in 2019. She holds a Certificate IV in Project Management Practice from the University of the South Pacific, and is currently pursuing a Master of Business Administration (MBA) through the Australian Institute of Business.

She is married to Willie H. Kwansing, and their blended family includes ten children. Cross Kwansing is an active member of the Church of Jesus Christ of Latter-day Saints and has held various lay leadership positions within the denomination. Among her ecclesiastical contributions, she served a church service mission dedicated to facilitating the BYU-Pathway Worldwide higher education program within Kiribati, helping expand local access to distance learning.

Before entering public office, she completed the East-West Center's Changing Faces of Women's Leadership program and was selected as Kiribati's first participant in the Obama Foundation Asia-Pacific Leaders Program. She worked extensively across sustainable development, social impact, and community development. She held consultancy positions in Kiribati with international bodies including the Secretariat of the Pacific Regional Environment Programme (SPREP), the Pacific Community, the Global Green Growth Institute and the Millennium Challenge Corporation. Additionally, she served as the Manager of Welfare and Self-Reliance for the Church of Jesus Christ of Latter-day Saints, overseeing the denomination's regional welfare programs and humanitarian initiatives across Kiribati and the Marshall Islands. Cross Kwansing is the founder of the Tungaru Climate Alliance, the In-Country Director of Kindling Kiribati – Small Business Development, and she reinvigorated the local Rotary presence by establishing and serving as the President of the Rotary Club of Tarawa. Additionally, she served as an advisor to the Kiribati Rotaract Youth Club, Tungaru Youth Action and the Kiribati National Youth Council.

During her residency in Melbourne, Australia, her civic involvement included serving as President of the Victorian Kiribati Association, the Digital Women's Network, and Vice-President of the St Kilda Cycling Club.

== Political career ==
During the 2024 Kiribati parliamentary election, Cross Kwansing contested as an independent candidate for the South Tarawa constituency (Tarawa Teinainano), which is the largest constituency in the country. Standing as one of 18 female candidates in a field of 114 nationwide, she placed second in the first round of voting among 22 candidates in her constituency. She successfully secured election in the second round, becoming one of only five women elected to the 45-seat Maneaba ni Maungatabu, alongside Tessie Eria Lambourne, Lavinia Teatao Teem, Ruta Teretia Babo, and Tangariki Reete.

Following the election, Cross Kwansing expressed diplomatic support for Kiribati's 2019 foreign policy realignment from Taiwan to China, noting that the transition had elevated the nation's regional profile and that international observers frequently overstated domestic anxieties regarding Chinese influence.

In September 2024, after meeting with the newly re-elected President Taneti Maamau, she formally joined the Tobwaan Kiribati Party. She was subsequently appointed to the Cabinet as the Minister for the Ministry of Women, Youth, Sport and Social Affairs.

=== National Social Protection Reform ===
As Minister, Cross Kwansing oversaw significant expansions to the nation's social protection frameworks following the release of the 2025 Household Income and Expenditure Survey (HIES), which demonstrated a near 75% drop in national poverty rates. Her ministry directed the expansion of the Senior Citizens Allowance (SCA), the Support Fund for the Unemployed (SFU), and the Disability Support Allowance (DSA), utilising reinvested marine sector revenues to institutionalise adaptive, gender-responsive social safety nets against climate-driven shocks.

=== Sports Infrastructure and 2030 Micronesian Games Bid ===
In June 2026, Cross Kwansing led Kiribati's successful bid to host the XII Micronesian Games in 2030, securing the hosting rights by a majority vote of the Micronesian Games Council (MGC) General Assembly. This selection marked the first time in the event's history since its founding in 1969 that Kiribati was awarded the sub-regional sporting event. Following the announcement, her ministry coordinated the initial strategic phases for national sports infrastructure legacy projects, including planned developments for a dedicated Games Village, the establishment of the Kiribati Institute of Sport, and structural upgrades to the National Stadium.

=== International and Regional Leadership ===
In September 2025, Cross Kwansing delivered Kiribati's national address at the United Nations General Assembly High-Level Meeting for the Beijing Declaration 30th Anniversary of the Fourth World Conference on Women, advocating for direct access to gender-responsive climate finance. In October 2025, she was designated by the Pacific Islands Forum (PIF) as the Regional Political Champion for Gender Equality and Social Inclusion (GESI) under the 2050 Strategy for the Blue Pacific Continent.

At the 2025 Pacific Islands Forum Women Leaders Meeting (PIFWLM), she was formally nominated as a Pacific Ambassador for the Women Deliver 2026 Conference. In these concurrent regional capacities, she served as a key governmental voice bridging regional intergovernmental commitments with global civil society frameworks at the April 2026 summit in Melbourne, where she led high-level dialogues advocating for structural reforms to climate finance.

In April 2026, she successfully led Kiribati's election to a seat on the United Nations Commission on the Status of Women (CSW) for the 2026–2030 term. The appointment marked the first time an I-Kiribati representative and a Pacific Islander was elected to the global functional body, closing a generational sub-regional absence within the Asia-Pacific Group (APG) allocations.

== Awards and recognition ==
- Kiribati Order of Merit (O.M.): Awarded in 2021 by the President of Kiribati in recognition of her humanitarian initiatives and significant contributions to national development.
- Obama Foundation Leader: Selected in 2022 as the first Asia-Pacific Leader representing Kiribati.
- Island Ambassador: Recognised by Island Innovation for her advocacy regarding sustainable island development and climate resilience.
