= Tangariki Reete =

Speaker of the Kiribati House of Assembly (2020–2024)

Speaker of the House of Assembly
- In office 22 May 2020 – 13 September 2024
- Deputy: Ioteba Redfern
- Preceded by: Tebuai Uaai
- Succeeded by: Willie Tokataake

Minister of Women, Youth, Sports and Social Affairs
- In office 15 October 2013 – 11 March 2016
- Preceded by: Position established
- Succeeded by: David Collins

Member of the House of Assembly from Betio
- In office 2008 – 21 April 2020
- Succeeded by: Tebao Awerika

Personal details
- Born: 1967 (age 58–59)
- Party: Boutokaan Kiribati Moa Party

Tangariki Reete is an I-Kiribati politician who served as the first woman Speaker of the House of Assembly, an office she held between 2020 and 2024. She served as a Member of the House of Assembly from 2008 until 2020, during which she also served as the first Minister for Women, Youth and Social Affairs from 2013 until 2016.

== Career ==
Reete was born in 1967.

She spent 3 terms as an MP, leaving office after being defeated in the second round of voting by Tebao Awerika in 2020.

She returned and she was successfully re-elected in 2024 for Betio. She was one of five women elected to the 45 seats of the parliament. The others were Ruth Cross Kwansing, Lavinia Teatao Teem, Ruta Teretia Babo and former opposition leader Tessie Eria Lambourne.

Reete won a parliamentary vote to become Speaker of the House of Assembly on 22 May 2020. She won with 25 votes and defeated incumbent Speaker Tebuai Uaai, who was supported by the Tobwaan Kiribati Party. Betio MP Ioteba Redfern was sworn in as Deputy Speaker on 23 November 2021.
