= 1971 Gilbert and Ellice Islands general election =

General elections were held in the Gilbert and Ellice Islands on 19 March 1971.

== Background ==
Prior to the elections constitutional changes saw the House of Representatives replaced with a 33-member Legislative Council consisting of 28 elected members, three ex officio members (the Assistant to the Resident Commissioner, the Attorney General and the Financial Secretary) and two civil servants.

== Campaign ==
A total of 110 candidates contested the 28 elected seats, all running as independents. Of the 23 incumbent members, only 13 ran for re-election.

== Results ==
Only five of the 23 incumbent MPs were re-elected, with eight of them losing their seat. Tekarei Russell became the first female member of the legislature. Director of Agriculture Ray Harberd and Director of Education Harry Urquhart were appointed as the two nominated official members.

Constituency	Elected member
Abemama	Bauro Tokatake
Beru	Otiuea Tanentoa
Funafuti	Benjamin Kofe
Kuria	Paul Binatake Tokatake
Maiana	Bwebwetake Areieta
Makin	Ibeata Tonganieia
Marakei	Naboua Ratieta
Nanumea	Telavi Fati
Niutao	Tomu Sione
Nui	Sione Tui Kleis
Nukulaelae	Isa Paeniu
South Tabiteuea	Bureua Kamaoto
Urban Tarawa	Tekarei Russell
Urban Tarawa	Reuben Uatioa
Source: PIM, PIM, PIM, PIM

== Aftermath ==
The new Legislative Council met for the first time on 14 April. Reuben Uatioa was elected Leader of Government Business. An Executive Council was subsequently appointed by Resident Commissioner John Osbaldiston Field after consultation with Uatioa.

Executive Council
Position	Member
Leader of Government Business	Reuben Uatioa
Member for Communications and Lands	Naboua Ratieta
Member for Internal Affairs	Otiuea Tanentoa
Member for Natural Resources	Isa Paeniu
Member for Social Services	Bwebwetake Areieta
