= Sione Tui Kleis =

Tuvaluan politician (??–1979)

Speaker of the Tuvalu House of Assembly
- In office 1976–1977
- Succeeded by: Tupua Leupena

Member of the Tuvalu House of Assembly
- In office 1975–1976, 1977–1979
- Constituency: Nui

Minister for Commerce and Industry
- In office 1974–1975
- Succeeded by: Otiuea Tanentoa

Member of the GEIC House of Assembly
- In office 1974–1975
- Constituency: Nui

Member of the GEIC Legislative Council
- In office 1971–1974
- Constituency: Nui

Member of the GEIC House of Representatives
- In office 1967–1971
- Constituency: Northern Ellice

Personal details
- Died: 1979 (aged 48) Nui, Tuvalu

Sione Tui Kleiss (often written Kleis, died 1979) was a Tuvaluan civil servant, priest and politician. He was a member of the legislature of the Gilbert and Ellice Islands from 1967 until the Ellice Islands (later Tuvalu) separated in 1975, also serving as Minister for Commerce and Industry. Following the separation, he became a member of the Tuvalu House of Assembly and served as its Speaker.

== Biography ==
Martin Kleis, his ancestor, arrived from Denmark to Nui. Kleiss was educated at Elisefou school on Vaitupu island, before studying in Western Samoa, New Zealand and Italy. He initially worked in the civil service, before becoming the first Gilbert and Ellice Islander to be ordained as a Roman Catholic priest in 1961. He returned to the civil service in 1964, becoming a broadcaster on Radio Tarawa.

In 1967 he contested the first elections to the new House of Representatives and was elected from the Northern Ellice constituency. He was re-elected to a reconstituted Legislative Council in the 1971 elections, representing the Nui constituency. After being re-elected in 1974, he was appointed Minister for Commerce and Industry. However, in January 1975 he was asked to resign his ministerial role to become the Chief Minister's Advisor on Ellice Affairs.

When the Ellice Islands separated from the Gilberts in 1975, Kleis became a member of the new Ellice Islands House of Assembly, and in 1976 he was appointed Speaker of the House, giving up his constituency seat. He was re-elected in the 1977 elections and became a member of the opposition.

He died in Nui in 1979 at the age of 48.
