= Ministry of Women, Youth, Sports and Social Affairs =

Government ministry of Kiribati

The Ministry of Women, Youth, Sports and Social Affairs (MWYSSA) is a government ministry of Kiribati, headquartered in South Tarawa, Tarawa. The ministry was created in October 2013.

== Ministers ==
- Tangariki Reete (2013–2016)
- David Collins (2016–2018)
- Kourabi Nenem (2018–2019), Vice President and Minister for Women, Youth, Sports and Social Affairs (MWYSSA), before 2018, he was Minister for Public Works & Utilities
- Taoaba Kaiea (2019–2020)
- Martin Moreti (2020–2024)
- Ruth Cross Kwansing (2024-2028)
