= Bwebwetake Areieta =

I-Kiribati politician (??–1980)

Minister of Communications, Works and Utilities
- In office 1974–1978
- Preceded by: Naboua Ratieta
- Succeeded by: Babera Kirata

Member for Social Services
- In office 1971–1974

Member of the House of Assembly
- In office 1974–1980
- Constituency: Maiana

Member of the Legislative Council
- In office 1971–1974
- Preceded by: Tem Jacob
- Constituency: Maiana

Personal details
- Died: 8 March 1980 (aged 37) Ambo, Kiribati

Bwebwetake Areieta (died 8 March 1980) was an I-Kiribati politician. He served as a member of the Legislative Council and House of Assembly from 1971 until his death, also holding the posts of Member for Social Services and Minister of Communications, Works and Utilities during the 1970s.

== Biography ==
Originally from Maiana, Areieta married Matereti from Onotoa and the couple moved to Bairiki. He began work in the civil service in 1963 and became editor of the Colony Information Notes weekly newsheet, In 1966 he was seconded to the Public Relations Office of the Fijian government for a short spell. He became an assistant broadcasting officer for Radio Tarawa and attended a BBC producers course in the UK. He later rose to become officer-in-charge of the broadcasting department.

In 1971 he was elected to the Legislative Council of the Gilbert and Ellice Islands and was appointed Member for Social Services. After being re-elected to the new House of Assembly in 1974 he was appointed Minister of Communications, Works and Utilities by Chief Minister Naboua Ratieta. Although he was re-elected again in 1978, Ratieta lost the election for Chief Minister and Areieta was left out of the new cabinet.

He died in March 1980 in a motorcycle accident.
