= Naboua Ratieta =

Kiribati politician (1938–1986)

Chief Minister
- In office 1974–1978
- Preceded by: Reuben Uatioa
- Succeeded by: Ieremia Tabai

Minister of Communications, Works and Utilities
- In office 1971–1974
- Succeeded by: Bwebwetake Areieta

Member of the House of Assembly
- In office 1974–1986

Member of the Legislative Council
- In office 1971–1974
- Constituency: Marakei

Member of the House of Representatives
- In office 1968–1971
- Preceded by: Buren Ratieta
- Constituency: Marakei

Personal details
- Born: 26 April 1938; Ocean Island, Gilbert and Ellice Islands
- Died: 12 June 1986 (aged 48); South Tarawa, Kiribati

Naboua T. Ratieta CBE (26 April 1938 – 12 June 1986) was an I-Kiribati politician who became the first Chief Minister of the Gilbert and Ellice Islands in 1974. The Ellice Islands separated from the colony the following year, and he remained Chief Minister of the Gilbert Islands until 1978. He also served as an MP from 1968 until his death.

== Biography ==
Ratieta was born on Ocean Island in April 1938, the son of Bauro Ratieta of Marakei. He was adopted by Naboua on Nonouti island, where he grew up as a Roman Catholic. He was educated at Bairiki Primary School and then King George V School from 1951 to 1956. He joined the civil service as a cadet assistant administrate officer in 1957, before becoming an information officer in 1962 and a senior executive officer in 1965. Between 1968 and 1973 he was secretary of the Medical Department. In 1965, he was amongst the founders of the Gilbertese National Party (GNP).

Ratieta was first elected to the House of Representatives in a September 1968 by-election in Marakei, following the death of the incumbent member, his brother Buren of the GNP. After being re-elected in 1971 he was appointed Minister of Communications, Works and Utilities in the cabinet of Reuben Uatioa. The following year he was appointed Acting Leader of Government Business when Uatioa was absent due to illness. After Uatioa lost his seat in the 1974 elections, Ratieta was appointed to the post of Chief Minister. He was awarded a CBE in the 1977 New Year Honours.

He was re-elected again in the February 1978 parliamentary elections, but direct elections had been introduced for the post of Chief Minister. Although he was one of five candidates nominated by the House of Assembly for the post of Chief Minister, the constitution only allowed for four members to be put to voters and Ratieta was the one to miss out.

Following the 1982 parliamentary elections, he was nominated to contest the subsequent presidential elections, but received only 10.5% of the vote, finishing last out of the four candidates. He died in Kiribati Central Hospital in 1986 from heart disease, and was given a state funeral.
