= South Tabiteuea =

Island council of Kiribati

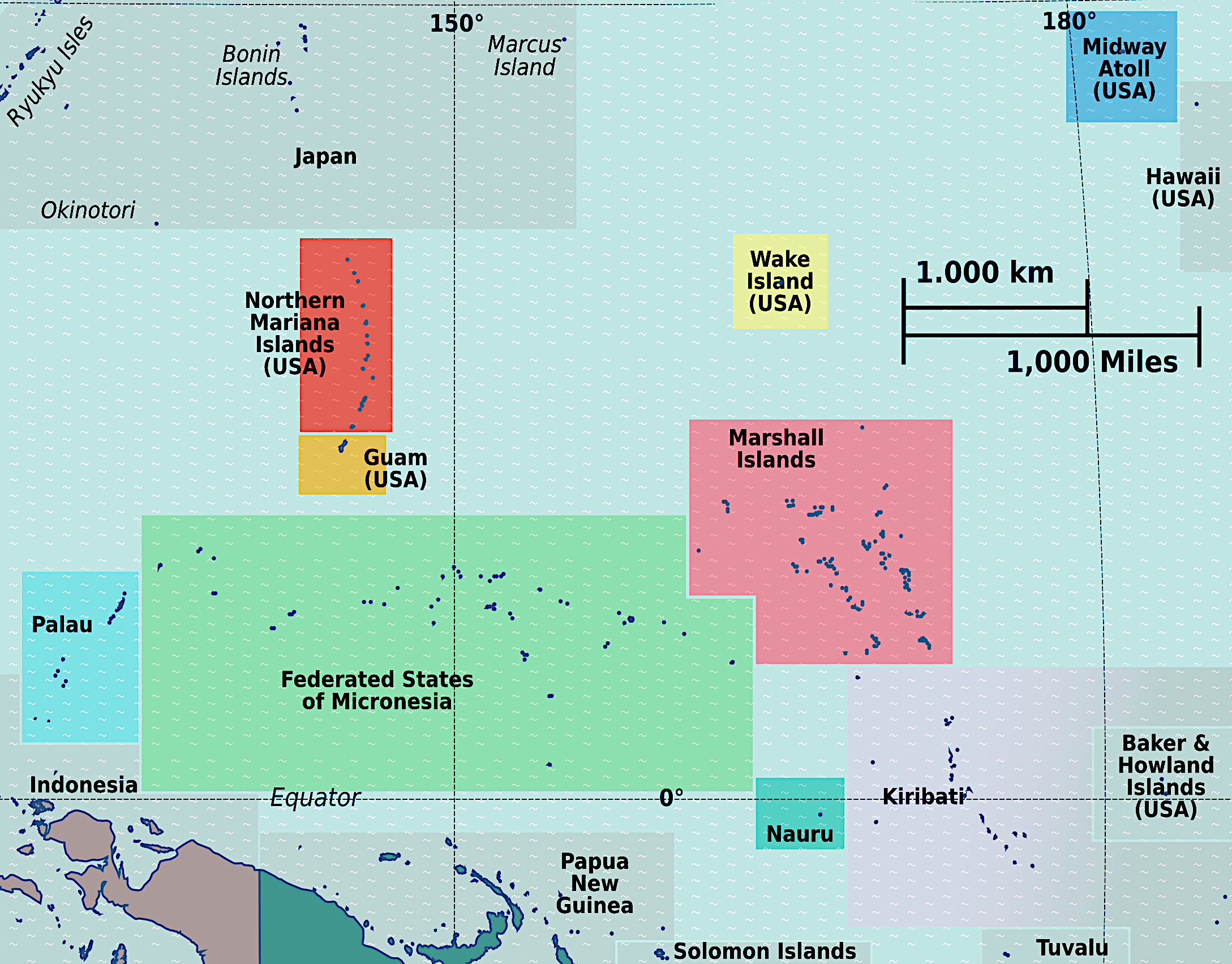
- Location within Kiribati Location within Micronesia Location within Oceania Location within Pacific Ocean

Geography
- Location: Pacific Ocean
- Coordinates: 1°21′S 174°48′E
- Archipelago: Gilbert Islands

Administration
- Kiribati

South Tabiteuea is an island council of Kiribati.
