= Thurston Clarke =

American novelist

- Occupations: Historian, journalist
- Writing career
- Notable awards: Lowell Thomas Award for Travel Literature
- Website: thurstonclarke.com

Thurston Clarke (born 1946) is an American historian, author and journalist.

== Education and career ==
Clarke was educated at Yale University, Columbia University and the School of Oriental and African Studies, London.

Clarke is the author of thirteen books, the most recent of which is Honorable Exit: How a Few Brave Americans Risked All to Save Our Vietnamese Allies at the End of the War.

Clarke is a frequent speaker on topics such as writing, modern history and travel and has appeared in documentaries.

== Honors and awards ==
Clarke is the recipient of a Guggenheim fellowship. He has also received the Lowell Thomas Award for Travel Literature.

== Personal life ==
He lives with his wife and three daughters in the Adirondacks, in upstate New York. His daughter, Sophie Clarke, was the winner of Survivor: South Pacific, the 23rd season of the popular CBS reality television show.

Thurston Clarke is the son-in-law of former British Ambassador Julian Bullard.

== List of works ==
=== Non-fiction ===
- Dirty Money: Swiss Banks, the Mafia, Money Laundering, and White Collar Crime (1975) (with John J. Tigue)
- The Last Caravan (1978)
- By Blood and Fire: The Attack on the King David Hotel (1981)
- Lost Hero: The Mystery of Raoul Wallenberg (1982) (with Frederick E. Werbell)
- Equator: A Journey (1988)
- Pearl Harbor Ghosts (1991)
- California Fault: Searching for the Spirit of a State Along the San Andreas (1996)
- Searching for Crusoe: A Journey Among the Last Real Islands (2001) (reprinted as Islomania)
- Ask Not: The Inauguration of John F. Kennedy and The Speech That Changed America (2004)
- The Last Campaign: Robert F. Kennedy and 82 Days That Inspired America (2008)
- JFK's Last Hundred Days: The Transformation of a Man and The Emergence of a Great President (2013)
- Honorable Exit: How a Few Brave Americans Risked All to Save Our Vietnamese Allies at the End of the War (2019)

=== Fiction ===
- Thirteen O'Clock (1984)
