= Willie Tokataake =

I-Kiribati politician

Speaker of the House of Assembly
- Incumbent
- Assumed office 13 September 2024
- Deputy: Ruta Teretia Babo
- Preceded by: Tangariki Reete

Member of the House of Assembly
- In office 1994–2024
- Preceded by: Baitongo Taburimai
- Succeeded by: Tokaibure Rabaua
- Constituency: Abemama

Ministry of Information, Communications, Transport and Tourism Development
- In office 2016 – 11 July 2020
- Preceded by: Rimeta Beniamina
- Succeeded by: Tekeeua Tarati

Ministry of Infrastructure and Sustainable Energy
- Incumbent
- Assumed office 2 July 2020
- Preceded by: Ruateki Tekaiara

Personal details
- Born: 25 May 1956 (age 70) Abemama
- Party: United Coalition Party; Tobwaan Kiribati Party

Willie Tokataake (born 25 May 1956) is an I-Kiribati politician who has served as Speaker of the House of Assembly since 2024 and Minister of Infrastructure and Sustainable Energy since 2020. Tokataake previously served as a member of the House of Assembly for Abemama from 1994 to 2024. He is a member of the royal family of Abemama.

== Early life ==
Willie Tokataake was born on 25 May 1956. He is a member of the ceremonial royal family of Abemama. His surname comes from Tokatake, his great-grandfather. Tokataake attended the Marine Training Centre on Tarawa before joining the crew of a German freighter, an experience he profoundly disliked. After two years, Tokataake returned to Abemama and married.

Tokataake was Minister of Education, Science and Technology in President Teburoro Tito’s cabinet from 1994 to 1998. He was the Minister for Information, Communications, Transport and Tourism development from 2016 to 2020.

On 2 July 2020, Tokataake was sworn in as Minister for Infrastructure and Sustainable Energy as part of President Taneti Maamau's cabinet. He was not re-elected in the 2024 Kiribati parliamentary elections. However, he was nominated and elected as the sole candidate for the Speaker of the House of Assembly.
