= Reuben Uatioa =

Gilbertese politician

Speaker of the House of Representatives
- In office 1974–1975

Leader of Government Business
- In office 1971–1974
- Succeeded by: Naboua Ratieta

Chief Elected Member
- In office 1967–1971

Member of the Legislative Council
- In office 1971–1974
- Succeeded by: Abete Merang
- Constituency: Urban Tarawa

Member of the House of Representatives
- In office 1967–1971
- Constituency: Urban Tarawa

Member of the Advisory Council
- In office 1963–1967

Personal details
- Born: 1924; Onotoa, Gilbert and Ellice Islands
- Died: 1977; South Tarawa, Gilbert Islands

Te Reuben Kiraua Uatioa MBE (1924 – 1977) was a Gilbertese politician. After being elected to the House of Representatives in 1967, he became the first Chief Elected Member of the Gilbert and Ellice Islands colony and then Leader of Government Business, serving until unexpectedly losing his seat in 1974. He then served as Speaker of the House of Representatives until 1975.

== Biography ==
Uatioa was born on Onotoa in 1924. He was adopted by a family from Nonouti and was educated at the London Missionary Society's Hiram Bingham High School in Rongorongo on Beru. He began working as a radio operator in the Phoenix Islands in 1940, before joining the naval reserve in Fiji in 1941. Following World War II he worked for the New Zealand Meteorological Service in Fiji, before returning to the Gilbert and Ellice Islands in 1950.

Uatioa was appointed as the islands' first broadcasting and information officer in 1955. In 1963 he was appointed to the new Advisory Council. He established the Tungaru, a Gilbertese cultural movement, and in 1965 founded the Gilbertese National Party, an offshoot of the movement. He was awarded an MBE in the 1966 New Year Honours.

In the first elections to the new House of Representatives, he was elected from the Urban Tarawa constituency. Following the elections, he was elected Chief Elected Member. After being re-elected to the reconstituted Legislative Council in 1971, Uatioa was elected the first Leader of Government Business. However, he surprisingly lost his seat in the 1974 elections, losing to union leader Abete Merang. Following the elections, he became Speaker of the House of Representatives, a role he held until resigning in 1975.

Uatioa continued in local politics, serving as president of Teinainano Urban Council until 1977. In 1977 he was appointed Public Service Commissioner. While planning to contest the 1978 elections, he died later in 1977. The Reuben K. Uatioa Stadium was subsequently named for him.
