= R. W. Robson =

New Zealand journalist

- Born: Robert William Robson; 15 September 1885; Southland, Colony of New Zealand
- Died: 14 October 1984 (aged 99); Avoca Beach, Australia
- Occupations: Journalist; publisher; writer

Robert William Robson (16 September 1885 – 14 October 1984) was a New Zealand journalist. Robson was born and raised on a remote farm in Southland. Despite lacking formal education, he became a reporter for various newspapers in New Zealand and Australia. In the latter half of his career, Robson turned away from metropolitan dailies and began focusing on the Pacific Islands. He founded Pacific Islands Monthly in Sydney in 1930 and wrote or edited several books on the region. In 1956, he bought The Fiji Times and Shanti Dut from Alport Barker and became a successful newspaper publisher in Fiji. Robson retired in 1974.

== Early life ==
Robert William Robson was born on 16 September 1885 on a farm in Southland, New Zealand, the eldest of 13 children. He did not go to school because the farm was very isolated. It was his mother who taught him how to read and write. When he was 13, Robson began working for a neighbouring farmer. After the 12-hour work days, he found time to study algebra, English and Pitman shorthand.

== Career ==
Robson already had aspirations to become a journalist before his family moved to Invercargill. After attending night school classes, Robson found employment with the Balclutha Free Press. He then worked as a reporter at several country newspapers, including the Oamaru Mail, the Timaru Post, the Wairarapa Daily Times and the Otago Daily Times. In 1916, Robson joined The Sydney Morning Herald in Australia. He was frequently assigned to the press gallery in Melbourne, which at the time was home to the federal parliament. Robson became general manager of the Sydney Daily Telegraph Company in the early 1920s. Robson did not enjoy administration work. In 1924, he moved to London to work as a Fleet Street correspondent for Australian dailies. He returned to Australia the following year.

=== Pacific Islands ===
Robson first saw the Pacific Islands in 1914. While working at The New Zealand Herald, Robson was chosen to accompany Lord Liverpool, Governor of New Zealand, on a tour of Polynesia. On Rarotonga, Robson noticed how eager the islanders were for news from other island groups and conceived the idea of a magazine for the Pacific Islands. After deciding a career in metropolitan dailies held nothing for people past middle age, Robson founded Pacific Islands Monthly in Sydney, 1930. He established Pacific Publications Pty Ltd in 1932 and retained full ownership through the Depression and World War II before selling it off in the 1970s. Robson also wrote or edited several books on the region, including Queen Emma (1965), a biography of Emma Forsayth.

In February 1956, Robson bought The Fiji Times and Herald Ltd. from Alport Barker. The company published two newspapers: The Fiji Times and Herald, which had a circulation of 2,000 at the time, and Shanti Dut. With the former, Robson aimed to achieve the scope and reach of a national newspaper through advances such as expanding the Times' staff and modernising its printing plant. On 30 April 1956, The Fiji Times—Robson had shortened it to its original name—began early morning publication and utilising the air service with the goal of same-day distribution. Robson's enterprise proved highly successful. He raised funds and used his own resources to acquire a Cossar press, which could produce 4,000 16-page newspapers every hour. Nai Lalakai and Ni Bula Mai were added to the company's publications. By 1969, the Cossar press had outgrown the demand and a Goss Community web-offset press—which, per hour, could produce 15,000 copies of up to 32 pages and, if required, in more than one colour—was installed. Robson retired in 1974, aged 89, after selling the company to The Herald.

He died in Avoca Beach, New South Wales, on 14 October 1984, aged 99.
