= David Collins (I-Kiribati politician) =

I-Kiribati politician

Minister for Education

Minister for Women, Youth and Sports
- Incumbent
- Assumed office 15 March 2016

Member of the House of Assembly for Maiana
- Incumbent
- Assumed office 8 January 2016

President of the Kiribati National Olympic Committee
- Incumbent
- Assumed office 23 March 2013
- Vice President: Kobebe Taitai

Vice President of the Kiribati National Olympic Committee
- Succeeded by: Kobebe Taitai

President of the Kiribati Commonwealth Games Association

Personal details
- Born: 2 June 1972 (age 54)
- Profession: Footballer
Association football career
- Position: Midfielder
International career
Years	Team	Apps	(Gls)
2003	Kiribati	3	(0)

David Collins (born 2 June 1972) is an I-Kiribati politician and was the MP of Maiana. He has also represented Kiribati in basketball and football, playing for the latter as a midfielder at the 2003 South Pacific Games.

== Political career ==
Elected as MP in Maiana constituency of the Maneaba ni Maungatabu in January 2016, Collins was sworn in as the Kiribati Minister for Women, Youth and Sports in March 2016. Not re-elected in 2020, he terminated his cabinet position in April 2020.

== Football career statistics ==
=== International ===
As of matches played 2003.

National team	Year	Apps	Goals
Kiribati	2003	3	0
Total		3	0
