= Gilbertese National Party =

Kirbati political party

- Abbreviation: GNP
- Leader: Reuben Uatioa
- Chairman: Babera Kirata
- Founded: 16 October 1965
- Headquarters: South Tarawa
- Political position: Separation from the Ellice Islands

The Gilbertese National Party (GNP) was a political party in the Gilbert and Ellice Islands colony founded in 1965. It was the first ever political party in the British colony. It advocated for separation of the Gilbert Islands from the Ellice Islands due to Ellice Island influences on the Gilbert Islands.

== History ==
The rationale for the Gilbertese National Party to be founded came about when a large amount of Ellice Islanders obtaining high ranking positions in the British colonial civil service on the Gilbert Islands whilst a part of the Gilbert and Ellice Islands Colony. Due to them apparently being given favourable conditions, educated Gilbertese acted to protect their interests. Racial tensions between Gilbertese and Ellice Islanders became more pronounced at the end of 1964. A small group of Gilbertese, most of them senior civil servants, began meeting in private with the view to forming a political party committed to the defense of Gilbertese interests. A public meeting with more than 200 participants attended to the foundation in Bairiki, South Tarawa, on 16 October 1965. The Gilbertese National Party called for faster change. The president of the working committee announced that membership of the Gilbertese National Party would only be open to Gilbertese people but they would allow exceptions for long term residents of Gilbert to join. Within two days, 390 people had paid the 2 shillings membership fee.

Its founder Reuben Uatioa utilised his position as the colony's broadcasting officer to promote the new party, which led to him being removed from the role and the Gilbert and Ellice Islands Advisory Committee by the colonial government for using his role for political purposes. Two years after its foundation, the leader Reuben Uatioa was first among the 18 elected Gilbertese and five Ellice Islander members of the new House of Representatives, amongst them Babera Kirata, the president of GNP.

== Bibliography ==
- Gilbertese National Party. 1965. Gilbertese National Party Constitution. (Source: Barrie MacDonald, The Future of the G & E I, p. 19). Gilbert and Ellice Islands, Tarawa.
