= Euronesian =

Umbrella term for a mixed people

Samoan: 'Afakasi

Total population
- 258,600

Regions with significant populations
- United States: 125,628
- French Polynesia: 45,000
- New Caledonia: 25,000
- Samoa: 18,000
- Solomon Islands: 18,000
- Fiji: 16,000
- Papua New Guinea: 5,100
- American Samoa: 4,700
- Tonga: 2,000
- Kiribati: 1,100
- Cook Islands: 1,000
- Easter Island: c. 1,000
- Norfolk Island: 80
- Pitcairn Islands: c. 47
- Australia: Unknown
- New Zealand: Unknown

Languages
- Melanesian languages Micronesian languages Polynesian languages English, French, Spanish

Religion
- Predominantly: Christianity (Protestantism and Roman Catholicism); Minority: Indigenous religion, Animism, Islam, and some Atheism

Related ethnic groups
- Melanesians, Micronesians, Polynesians, Vazaha, Americans, Australians, New Zealanders, English people, French people, and other various European ethnic groups

Euronesian is an umbrella term and portmanteau for people of mixed European and either Melanesian, Micronesian, or Polynesian descent. The term is most commonly used in Samoa. British or French colonizers, missionaries and traders, as well as some descendants of Polynesians and Spaniards in Easter Island (where Chilean law and generic Chilean social views name them mestizos), and descendants of Micronesians and Spaniards in the Caroline Islands (the Federated States of Micronesia and Palau), the Mariana Islands (Guam and the Northern Mariana Islands), and the Marshall Islands. ʻAfakasi is the common term of reference for Euronesians in Samoa; in Fiji, the term Kailoma is usually used.

Distinct Euronesian groups include the Hawaiian Hapa haole, Norfolk Islanders, Bonin Islanders, Palmerston Islanders, Pitcairn Islanders, and Tahitian demis.

== See also ==
- Austronesian peoples
- Europeans in Oceania
- Indo people
- Multiracial people
