= Tekarei Russell =

Minister for Health and Family Planning of Kiribati

Minister for Health and Family Planning of Kiribati
- In office 1975–1977

Member of Parliament for South Tarawa
- In office 1971–1977

Tekarei Tibwere Russell (born 1937) is a former Gilbertese politician.

Her father was a pastor who worked on several islands including Nonouti, Butaritari (when it was still occupied by the Japanese military), and in Rabi, Fiji. In Fiji she was able to attend primary school, secondary school up to Form Three, at the time, and then went on to enter the Teacher's College in Nasinu, with support from her family. After graduating, she was asked by her government to return to Kiribati, which was then the Gilbert and Ellice Islands Colony, and taught at Temwanoku Primary School in Betio. As soon as the first Secondary School for girls, named Elaine Bernacchi School, was opened in 1959, she was asked to teach there alongside Mrs Ward, from the UK. Elaine Bernacchi was the name of the Resident Commissioner's wife, at the time, Mr Michael Bernacchi, who was instrumental in establishing the girls's secondary school. Mrs Russell became the first woman to be elected to the Legislative Council of the Gilbert and Ellice Islands colony, when she was elected MP for South Tarawa (the capital city) in 1971. Re-elected in 1975, she was appointed Minister for Health and Family Planning serving from 1975 to 1977; she later retired from politics and returned to teaching. She was awarded the Pride of Kiribati medal.
