= Pacific Islands Monthly =

Magazine from 1930 to 2000

- Editor: R. W. Robson
- Founder: Robert William Robson
- Founded: 1930
- Final issue: 2000
- Country: Australia
- Language: English
- ISSN: 0030-8722 (print); 1563-5759 (web)

Pacific Islands Monthly, commonly referred to as PIM, was a magazine founded in 1930 in Sydney by New Zealand-born journalist R. W. Robson.

Its Pacific Islands coverage and circulation included Dutch New Guinea (now part of Indonesia), Papua New Guinea, British Solomon Islands (now part of Solomon Islands), French Polynesia, New Hebrides (now part of Vanuatu), Norfolk Island (now governed by Australia), Gilbert and Ellice Islands Colony, Samoa, Niue, and Cook Islands, going as far east as the Marquesas Islands and Pitcairn Island.

The magazine ran for approximately 70 years, with the first issue on 16 August 1930 and the last issue on 1 June 2000.

== Background ==
Pacific Islands Monthly was started in Sydney. The first issue ran in August 1930, consisting of 12 pages, and was in the format of a newspaper. The following year it was presented in magazine format. Its founder, Robert William Robson, who was originally from New Zealand, moved to Sydney, Australia, during World War I. The journalists for the magazine were said to be some of the Pacific's most respected.

During the 1940s and to at least 1960, the magazine included advertisements for W. R. Carpenter & Co and Burns Philp.

In July 1942, the garrison commander of the Imperial Japanese Army at Kavieng, New Guinea, published a decree within the English-language PIM stating several conditions including that local citizens of the occupied area may have been required to provide labour, boat movements would be restricted at night, blackouts were to be observed, each house had to fly the Japanese flag, citizens were to bow (keirei) to all Japanese soldiers, and people had to learn the Japanese language. There was punishment for non-compliance.

Australian anthropologist and photographer Charles Mountford (1890–1976) contributed articles to PIM, as did US travel literature writer Robert Dean Frisbie (1896–1948).

In 1960, the annual subscription for most of the region was 24 Australian shillings (equivalent to A$44.60 in 2025), and in 1965, 36 Australian shillings (equivalent to A$61.30 in 2025). The December 1960 publication had 157 pages.

Co-editors from 1957 to 1964 were Stuart Inder (1926–2015) and Judy Tudor; Inder was sole editor from 1964 to 1975, after which he continued as the publisher until 1980.

In 1988 PIM became part of a Murdoch media empire takeover of several newspapers.

== Legacy ==
Commenced in the mid-1960s, the Pacific Islands Monthly Lunch remains one of Sydney's longest running professional lunch series, as of 2015.

== Archive ==
Pacific Islands Monthly (1931–2000) has been digitised and is now freely available online through Trove.
