= Birnie Island =

Uninhabited island of central Kiribati

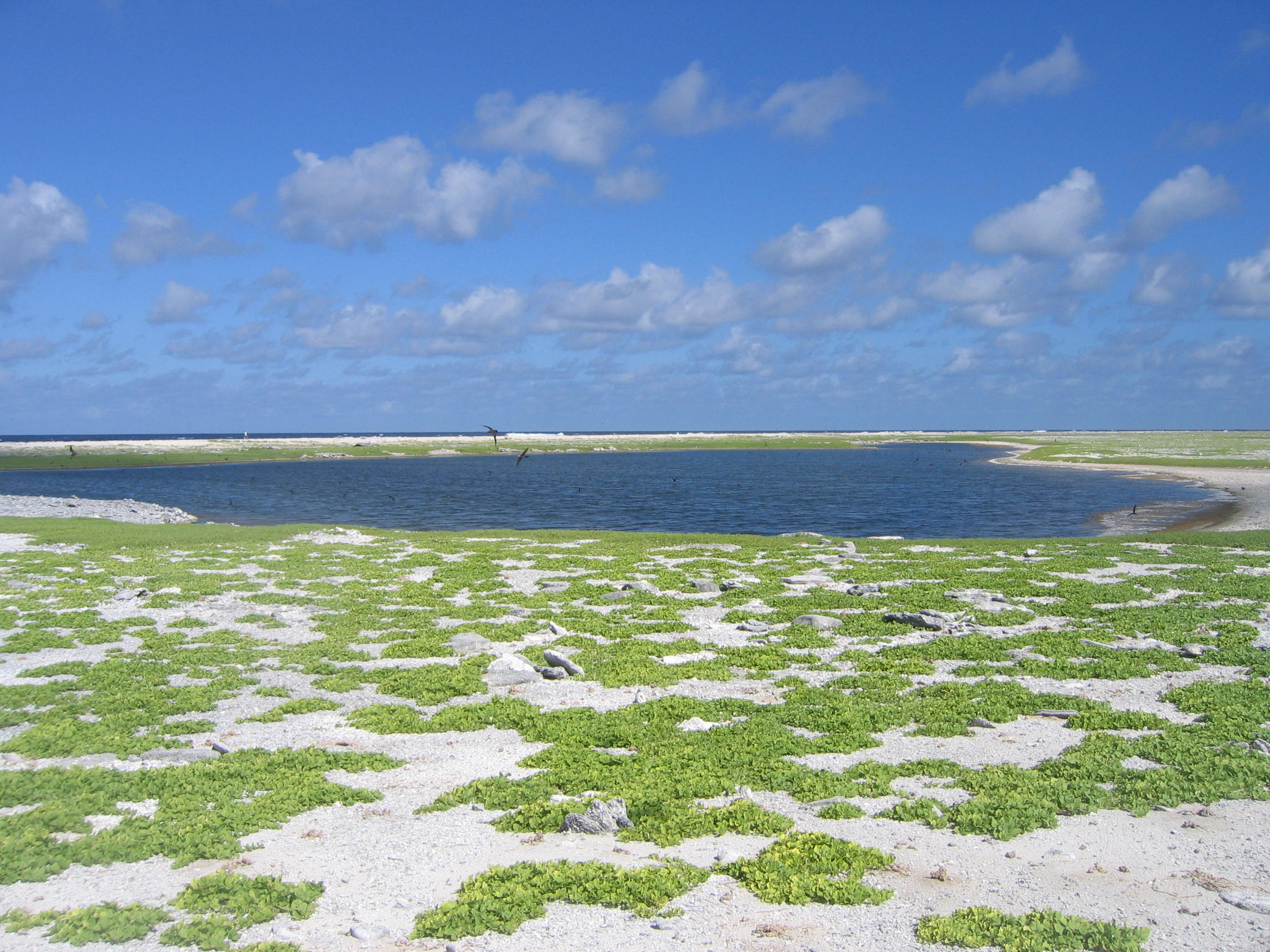
- Lagoon of Birnie Island. August 2008

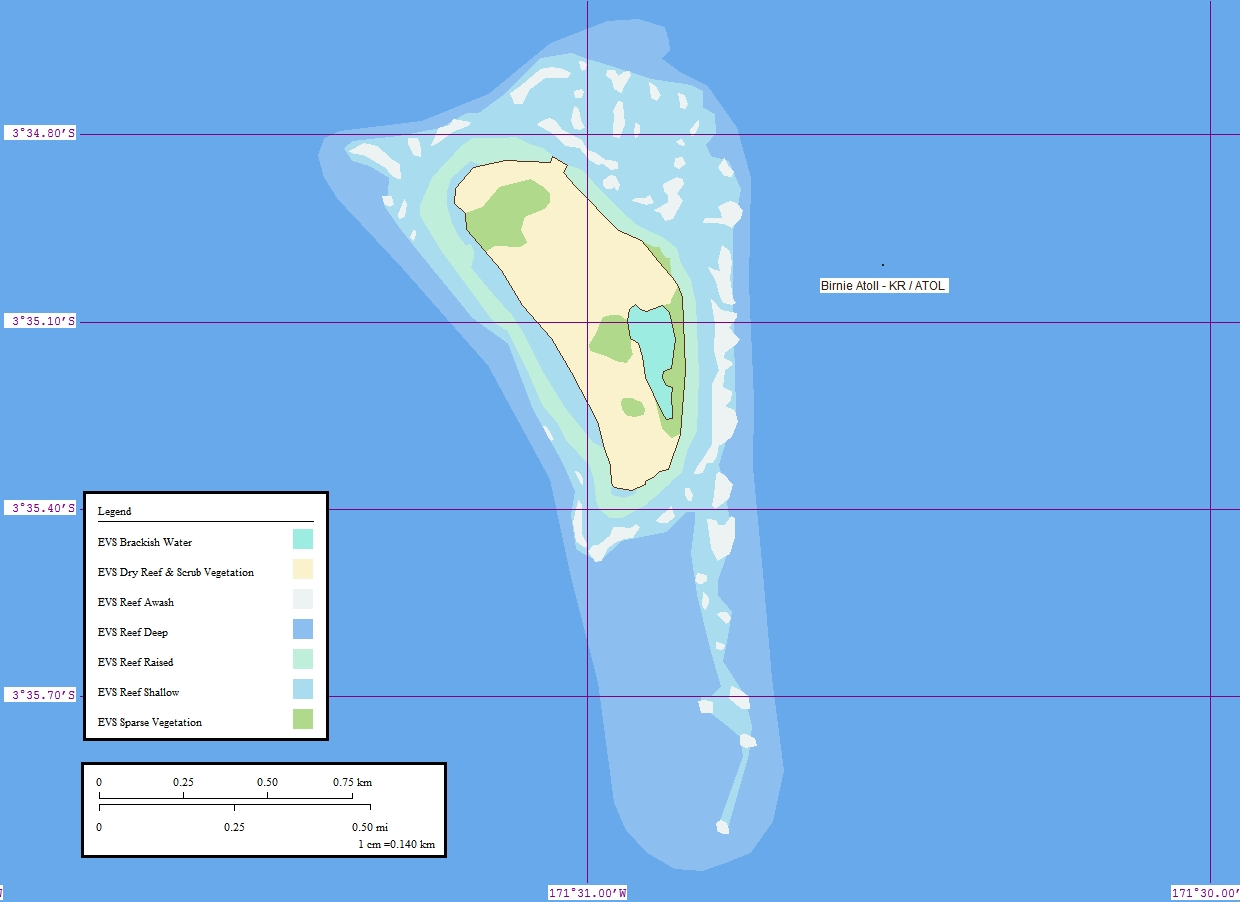
- Map of Birnie Island, Phoenix Islands, Kiribati

- Location in Kiribati Location in Oceania Location in the Pacific

Geography
- Location: Pacific Ocean
- Coordinates: 03°35′S 171°33′W
- Length: 1.2 km (0.75 mi)
- Width: 0.5 km (0.31 mi)
- Kiribati
- Administrative division: Kanton

Demographics
- Population: 0

Birnie Island is a small, uninhabited coral island, 20 hectares (49 acres) in area, part of the Phoenix Island group, that is part of the Republic of Kiribati. It is located about 100 kilometres (62 mi; 54 nmi) southeast of Kanton Island and 90 kilometres (56 mi; 49 nmi) west-northwest of Rawaki Island, formerly known as Phoenix Island. It lies at 03°35′S 171°33′W. Birnie Island measures only 1.2 kilometres (0.75 mi) long and 0.5 kilometres (0.3 mi) wide. There is no anchorage, but landing can be made on the lee shore.

The island is designated as the Birnie Island Wildlife Sanctuary. Kiribati declared the Phoenix Islands Protected Area in 2006, with the park being expanded in 2008. The 164,200-square-mile (425,300-square-kilometer) marine reserve contains eight coral atolls including Birnie Island.

== Flora and fauna ==
Birnie Island is low and dry, with a small, shallow lagoon in its southeast sector which is all but dried up. It is treeless, covered mostly with low shrubs and grasses, and was once home to a colony of rabbits, which have since been eradicated. Because of the undisturbed nature of the island, its vegetation, and the large colonies of seabirds which roost there, Birnie Island was declared a wildlife sanctuary in 1975. It now forms (as of 2008) part of the Phoenix Islands Protected Area, one of the world's largest marine protected area.

An expedition to carry out eradication of the population of Polynesian rat on Birnie Island was carried out in 2011.

== History ==
Birnie Island was discovered in 1823 by the London whaling ship Sydney, commanded by a Captain Emmett, and named after James Birnie, brother of London merchant Alexander Birnie. It was surveyed by the United States Exploring Expedition in January 1841.

In the 1860s, the island was claimed under the Guano Islands Act for the United States, though there is no evidence of guano ever being mined there. On July 10, 1889, the British flag was raised, and the island was declared a protectorate of the United Kingdom. In 1899, the island was leased to the Pacific Islands Company, Ltd. In 1916, it was included among the islands leased for 87 years to Captain Allen of the Samoan Shipping and Trading Company. This lease was taken over by the Burns Philp (South Sea) Company. During all this time, no human use seems to have been made of the island.

Birnie Island became part of the British Gilbert and Ellice Islands colony in 1937, then became part of Kiribati in 1979 when the country gained its independence. The United States gave up its claim in favor of Kiribati in the 1979 Treaty of Tarawa.

Birnie is rarely visited today, though a New Zealand-funded scientific expedition to rid the island of rats and other invasive animal species was carried out in 2008.

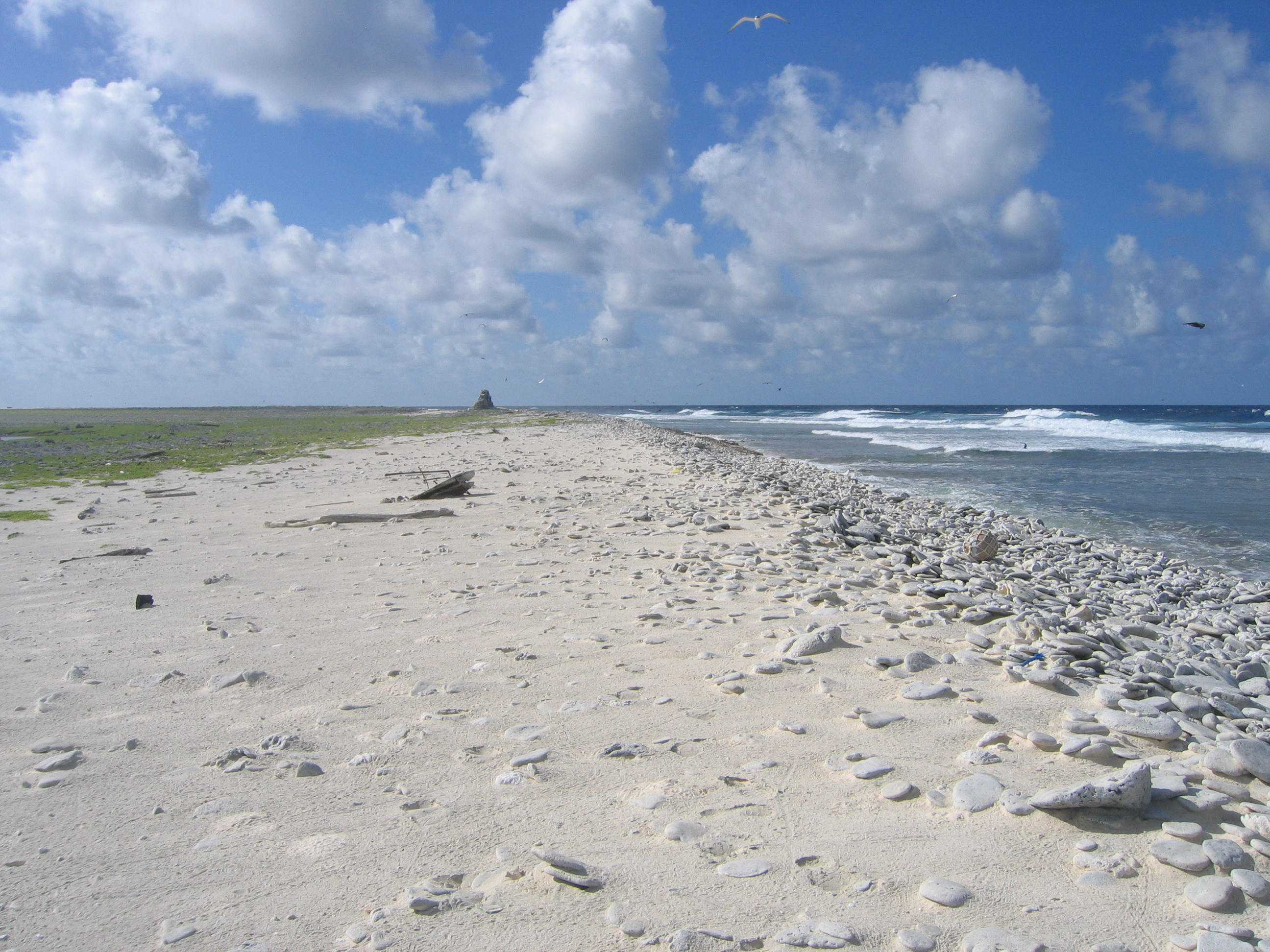
Birnie Island. Day beacon in background

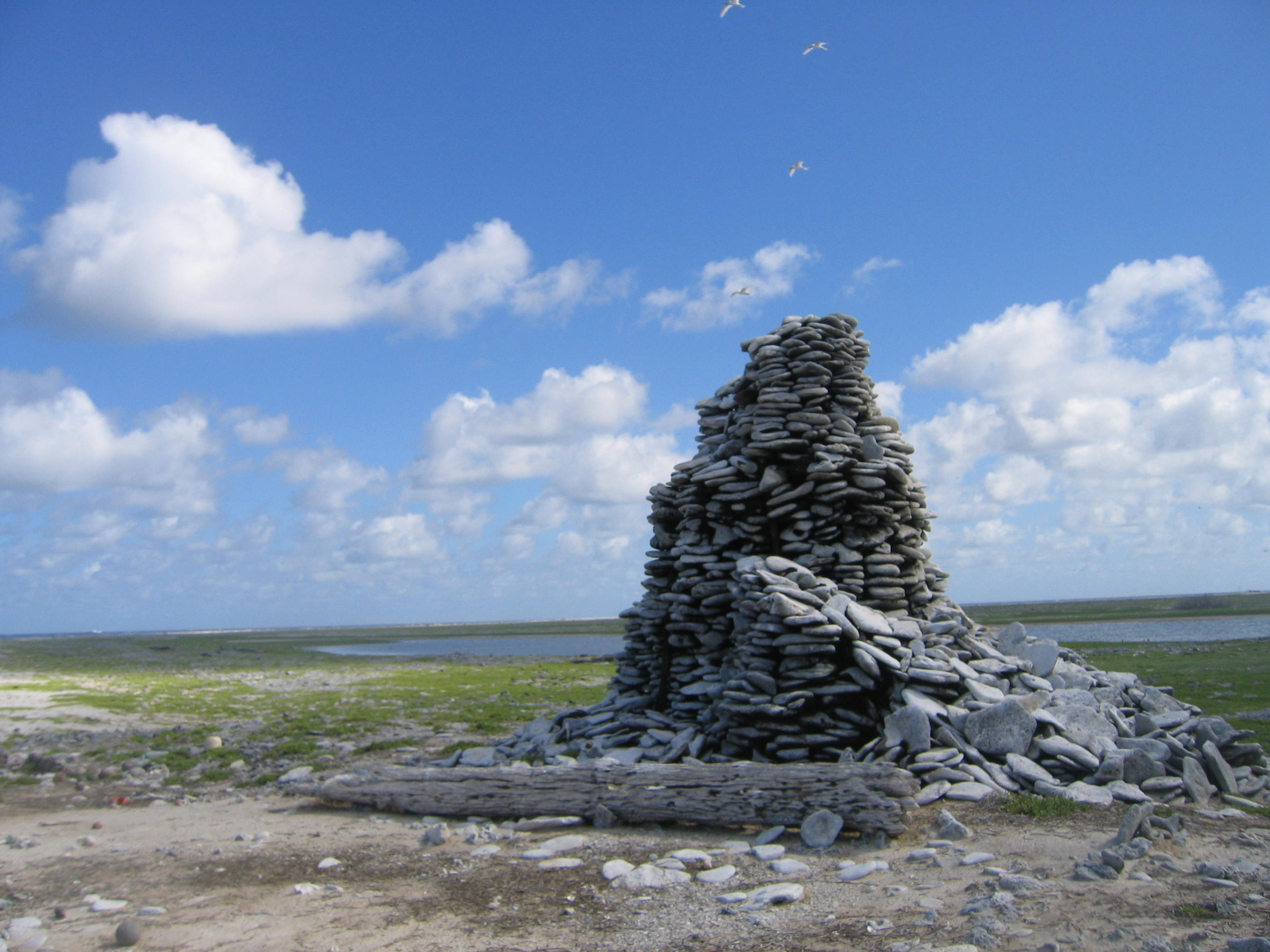
Birnie Island day beacon with lagoon in background

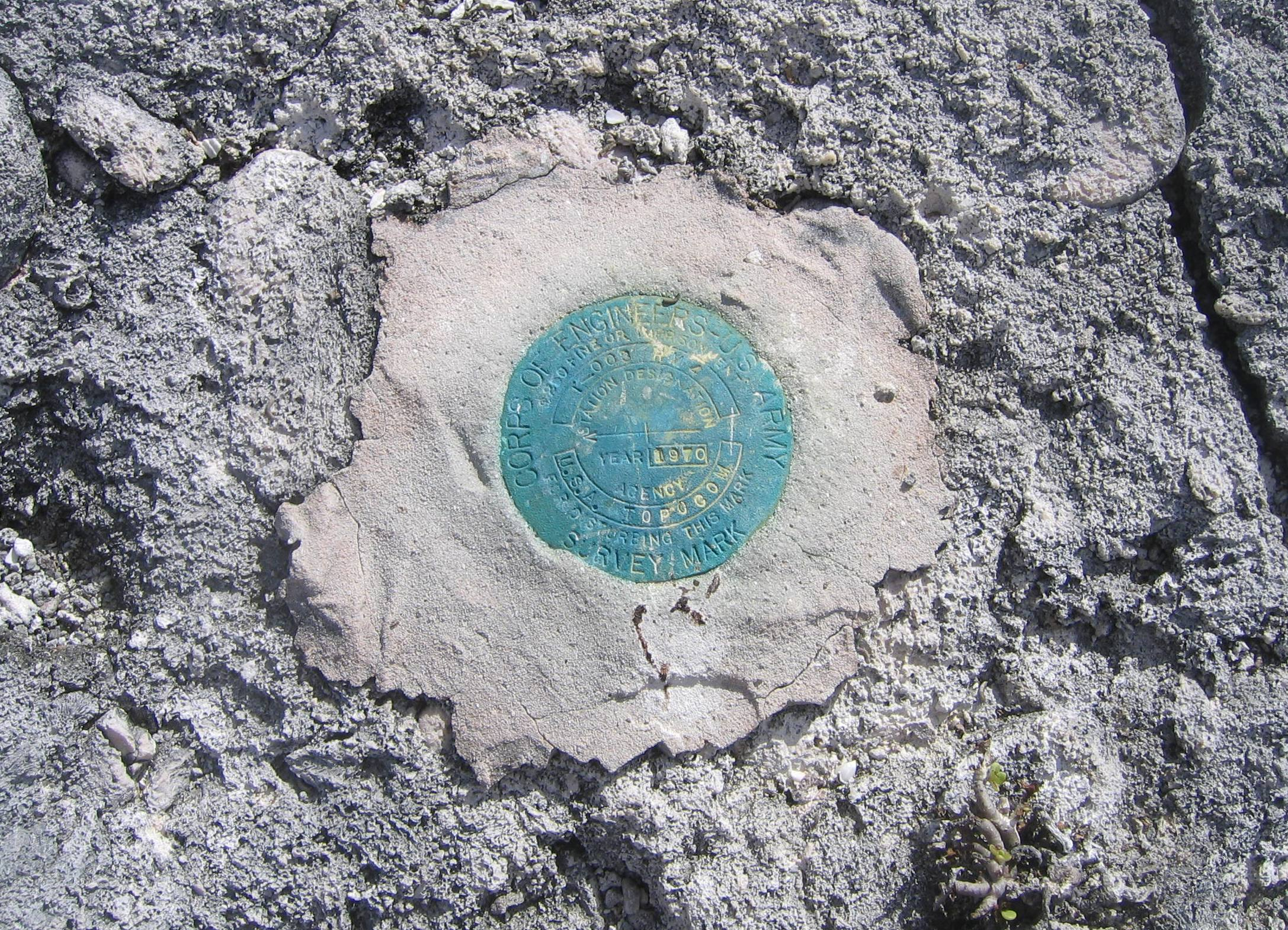
United States Army Corps of Engineers survey marker on Birnie Island

== See also ==
- List of Guano Island claims
- List of islands
- Desert island

== Sources ==
- Maude, Henry Evans: Of islands and men : studies in Pacific history; Melbourne [u.a.] : Oxford Univ. Pr., 1968
- Jones, A. G. E.: Ships employed in the South Seas trade Vol. 1: 1775 - 1861; Canberra 1986 & Vol. 2: 1775 - 1859; Burwood, Vic. [1992]
- Bryan, E.H.: American Polynesia and the Hawaiian Chain: Honolulu, Hawaii: Tongg Publishing Company, 1942
