= Phoenix Islands =

Central archipelago in Kiribati

Native name: Rawaki
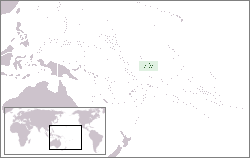

- Location within Kiribati Location within Oceania Location within Pacific Ocean

Geography
- Location: Pacific Ocean
- Coordinates: 4°30′S 172°0′W
- Area: 32.3 km^{2} (12.5 sq mi)
- Kiribati
- Administrative division: None
- Largest Island settlement: Canton Island (pop. 20)
- United States
- Status: Unincorporated (Howland and Baker Islands)

The Phoenix Islands, or Rawaki, are a group of eight atolls and two submerged coral reefs that lie east of the Gilbert Islands and west of the Line Islands in the Polynesia sub-region of Oceania, in the central Pacific Ocean north of Samoa. They are part of the Republic of Kiribati. Their combined land area is 28 square kilometres (11 mi^{2}). The only island of any commercial importance is Canton Island (also called Abariringa). The other islands are Enderbury, Rawaki (formerly Phoenix), Manra (formerly Sydney), Birnie, McKean, Nikumaroro (formerly Gardner), and Orona (formerly Hull). The islands had no permanent inhabitants until European colonization, and the current inhabitants descend from the Micronesian Gilbertese people despite the islands' location in the Polynesian Triangle.

The Phoenix Islands Protected Area, established in 2008, is one of the world's largest protected areas and is home to about 120 species of coral and more than 500 species of fish. The Phoenix Islands are uninhabited, except for a few families who live on Canton Island.

Historically, the Phoenix Islands have been considered part of the Gilberts island group (sometimes known as the Kingsmill island group).

Geographically, Baker Island and Howland Island, two unincorporated territories of the United States that lie to the north of the Phoenix Islands, could be considered part of the same island group as the Phoenix Islands. However, politically and for statistical compilation purposes, Howland and Baker are considered part of the group known as the United States Minor Outlying Islands.

The United States once laid claim to all the Phoenix Islands under the 1856 Guano Islands Act. However, when Kiribati became an independent republic in 1979, the United States and Kiribati signed the Treaty of Tarawa, under which the United States released all claims to the Phoenix Islands (except for Baker and Howland), which thenceforth became recognized as part of Kiribati.

The Phoenix Islands began to be known by that name sometime around the 1840s, as a generalization from one of the islands in the group, which had been named Phoenix Island earlier in the century (probably because Phoenix was a common name for the whaling ships that frequented the nearby waters at the time).

The Phoenix Islands were the site of the last colonial expansion attempted by the British Empire (through the Phoenix Islands Settlement Scheme) in the late 1930s.

== Geography, flora and fauna ==
Islands of Kiribati
Atoll/Island/Reef	Land Area km^{2}	Lagoon km^{2}	Coordinates
Phoenix Islands (Kiribati)
Kanton Island (Kanton)	9.0	50	02°50′S 171°43′W
Enderbury Island	5.1	0.6^{*}	03°08′S 171°05′W
Birnie Island	0.2	0.02^{*}	03°35′S 171°31′W
McKean Island	0.4	0.2^{*}	03°36′S 174°08′W
Rawaki (Phoenix Island)	0.5	0.5	03°43′S 170°43′W
Manra (Sydney Island)	4.4	2.2^{*}	04°27′S 171°15′W
Orona (Hull Island)	3.9	30	04°30′S 172°10′W
Nikumaroro (Gardner Island)	4.1	4	04°40′S 174°31′W
Phoenix Islands (Kiribati)	27.6	84.5	
Submerged coral reefs
Winslow Reef	–	1	01°36′S 174°57′W
Carondelet Reef	–	?	05°34′S 173°51′W
U.S. territories to the north
Baker Island	2.1	–	00°13′N 176°28′W
Howland Island	2.6	–	00°48′N 176°38′W
^{*}(The lagoons marked with an asterisk are included in the previous column as islands because they are landlocked bodies of water completely sealed off from the sea, which is not typical of atolls).

=== Kanton Island ===
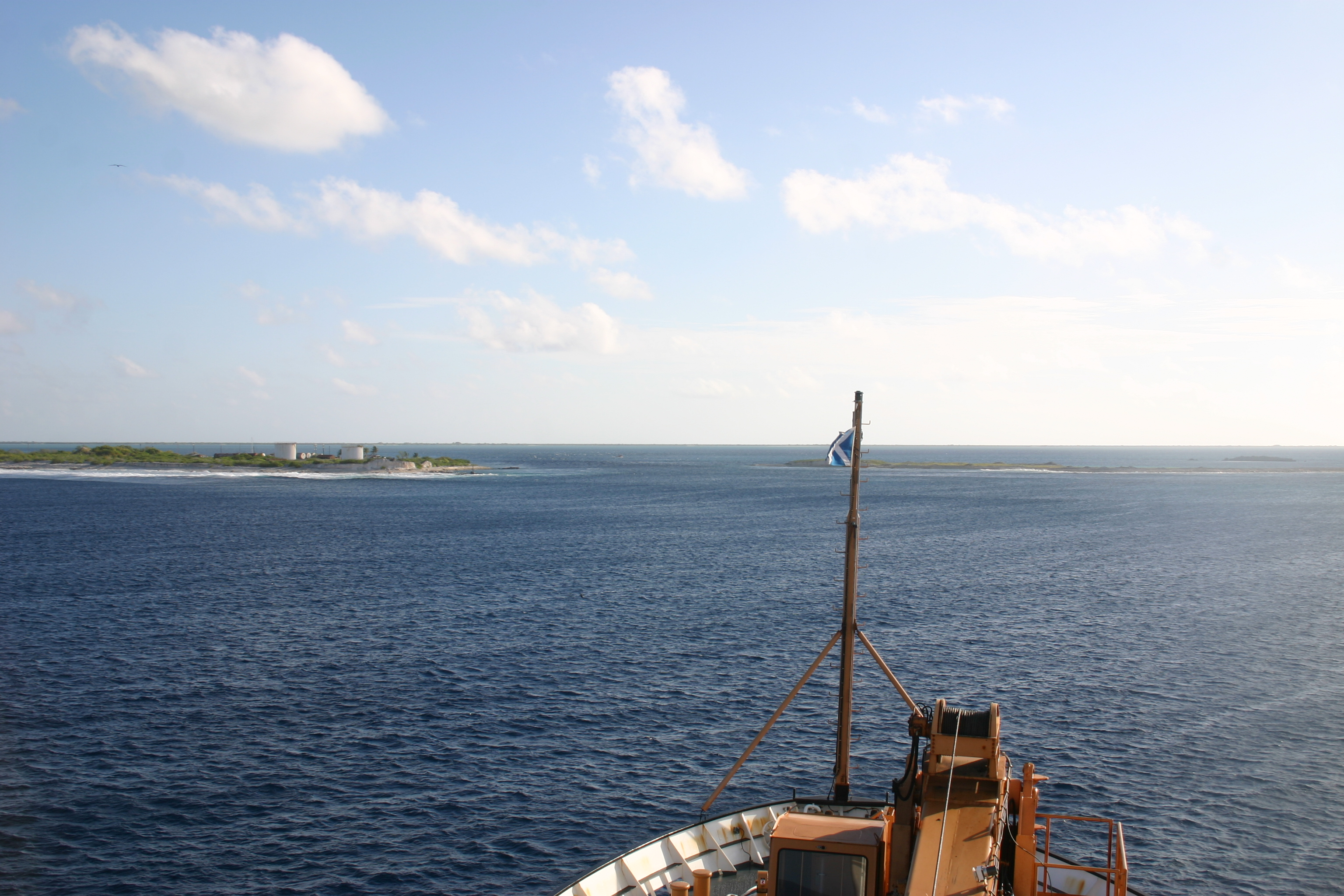
Entrance to Kanton Island's Lagoon. The village site is to the left.

Kanton Island (also called Abariringa) is the northernmost island in the Phoenix group and the only inhabited one. It is a narrow ribbon of land 9 km^{2} (3 sq mi), enclosing a lagoon of approximately 40 km^{2} (15 sq mi). Kanton is mostly bare coral, covered with herbs, bunch grasses, low shrubs, and a few trees. Its lagoon teems with 153 known species of marine life, including sharks, tuna, stingrays, and eels. Land fauna includes at least 23 bird species, lizards, rats, hermit crabs, and turtles.

In the mid-20th century, Kanton had an important trans-Pacific airport and refueling station called Langton, but its importance declined in the late 1950s with the introduction of long-range jet aircraft. After a brief stint as a U.S. missile-tracking station, the airport fell into disuse. However, today, the airport is still there, and (as of 2016) it was still home to a small military presence: 20 persons were residing there, mostly living in the buildings erected during the occupation of the island by Great Britain and the United States between 1936 and 1976.

=== Enderbury Island ===
Enderbury is a low, flat, small coral atoll lying 63 km (34 nmi; 39 mi) east-southeast of Kanton. Its lagoon is rather tiny, comprising only a small percentage of the island's area. Herbs, bunchgrass, morning-glory vines, and a few clumps of trees form the main vegetation on the island, while birds, rats, and a species of beetle are the known fauna. Heavily mined for guano in the late 19th century, Enderbury has seen little human impact following the evacuation of the last four residents in 1942, during World War II.

=== Birnie Island ===
Birnie Island is a small, flat coral island about 20 hectares (49 acres) in area, measuring 1.2 km (0.75 mi) long by 0.5 km (0.3 mi) wide. It contains a tiny lagoon, which has all but dried up. A nesting place for flocks of seabirds, Birnie is devoid of trees and is instead covered with low shrubs and grass. Unlike most of the other Phoenix Islands, Birnie does not appear to have been worked for guano or otherwise exploited by humans. It was declared a wildlife sanctuary in 1975.

=== McKean Island ===
McKean Island is the northwesternmost island of the Phoenix group. Its area is 57 hectares (140 acres), devoid of fresh water or trees, though it has a hypersaline lagoon at its center. Carpeted with low herbs and grasses, McKean provides a sanctuary for the world's largest nesting population of lesser frigatebird (Fregata ariel), with a population of up to 85,000 birds. It was actively worked for guano in the mid-19th century but was abandoned by 1870, and no further use has been made of it.

=== Rawaki Island ===
Rawaki, or Phoenix Island, measures approximately 1.2 km (0.75 mi) by 0.8 km (0.5 mi), and covers 65 hectares (160 acres) in area. Its lagoon is shallow and salty, with no connection to the ocean. However, it has several freshwater pools—the only known freshwater wetlands in the Phoenix Islands. Treeless, Rawaki is covered with herbs and grasses, and provides another important landing site for migratory seabirds. Worked for guano from 1859 to 1871, Rawaki was abandoned and no human use seems to have been made of it thereafter.

=== Manra Island ===
Manra, or Sydney Island, measures approximately 3.2 by 2.8 km (2.0 by 1.7 mi). It has a large, salty lagoon with depths reportedly varying between 5 and 6 metres (16 and 20 ft). The island is covered with coconut palms, scrub forest, herbs, and grasses, including the genera Tournefortia, Pisonia, Morinda, Cordia, Guettarda, and Scaevola. Manra contains definite evidence of prehistoric inhabitation in the form of at least a dozen platforms and remains of enclosures in the northeast and northwest portions of the island. K. P. Emory, an ethnologist at Honolulu's Bishop Museum, has estimated that two groups of people were present on Manra, one having migrated there from eastern Polynesia, the other from Micronesia. Wells and pits apparently dug by inhabitants were also found.

Extensively worked for guano beginning in 1884 by John T. Arundel & Co, Manra was developed into a copra plantation in the early 20th century. In 1938, Manra was selected as one of three atolls to be included in the Phoenix Islands Settlement Scheme, which represented the final expansion of the British Empire. Manra was subsequently plagued by drought and the death of the project's organizer. Due to these events, the effects of World War II, and the declining copra market, the island was abandoned in 1963.

=== Nikumaroro ===
Nikumaroro, or Gardner Island, is approximately 6 km (3.7 mi) long by 2 km (1.2 mi) wide, enclosing a large central lagoon. Vegetation is profuse, including scrub forests, coconut palms, and herbs. Large quantities of birds nest on the island, which was once the headquarters for the British colonial officer heading up the Phoenix Islands Settlement Scheme, Gerald Gallagher. Gallagher constructed a village on the western end of the atoll, with wide, coral-paved streets, a parade ground, a cooperative store, an administrative center and residence, and a radio shack.

Gallagher died on Nikumaroro in 1941, and was buried on the island (where his empty grave monument can still be seen, though his remains were later moved to Tarawa). Like the other atolls in the settlement project, Nikumaroro was abandoned in 1963 due to the scarcity of fresh water, together with the declining market for the copra that had been produced on the island.

Nikumaroro has appeared in media stories due to a theory that Amelia Earhart and Fred Noonan might have landed their plane at low tide on the edge of the atoll's barrier reef during their fateful around-the-world attempt in 1937. The International Group for Historic Aircraft Recovery (TIGHAR) made several expeditions to Nikumaroro during the 1990s and first decade of the 21st century, finding possible evidence, but no conclusive proof, for this theory. Investigation and expeditions to the island continue.

=== Orona Island ===
Orona, or Hull Island, measures approximately 8.8 by 4 km (5.5 by 2.5 mi), and, like Kanton, is a narrow ribbon of land surrounding a sizable lagoon with depths of between 15 and 20 metres (49 and 66 ft). Like Manra, it is covered with coconut palms, scrub forest, and grasses; it also contains evidence of prehistoric Polynesian habitation. An ancient stone marae stands on the eastern tip of the island, together with ruins of shelters, graves and other platforms. Unlike Manra, Orona does not seem to have been worked for guano, but it became a coconut plantation and was made a p. It was the British Phoenix Islands Settlement Scheme. Residents were evacuated in 1963 due to drought and the declining copra market.

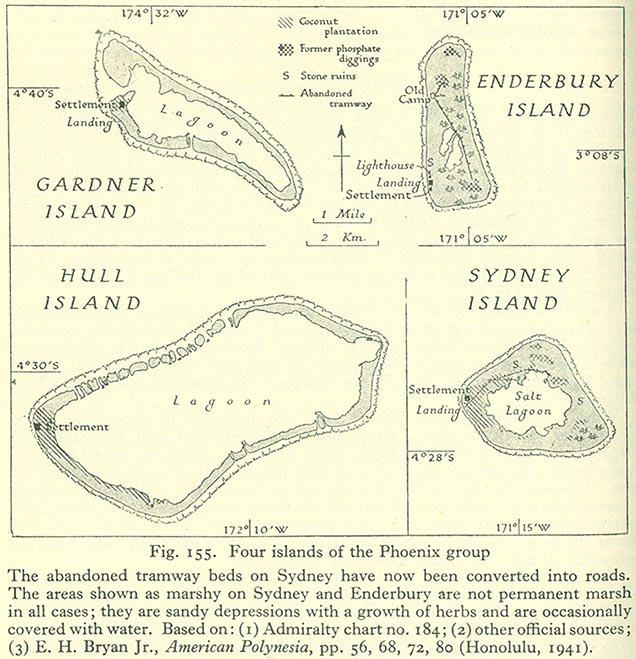
Islands of the Settlement Scheme and Enderbury Island

== History of the islands ==
=== Early history ===
Evidence suggests that Howland Island was the site of a prehistoric settlement, which may have extended down to Rawaki, Canton, Manra, and Orona—probably in the form of a single community using several adjacent islands. Archaeological sites have been discovered on Manra and Orona that suggest there were two distinct groups of settlers, one from eastern Polynesia and one from Micronesia. The hard life on these isolated islands undoubtedly led either to the extinction or emigration of these settled peoples, in much the same way that other islands in the area (such as Christmas Island and Pitcairn) were abandoned.

These ancient settlements were probably founded around 1000 BC when eastern Melanesians are known to have traveled northward across the water. Later settlement by Polynesians and contact with Polynesia is evident from archaeological digs. These have yielded basalt artifacts that originated in Samoa, the Marquesas, and the Cook Islands and were transported to the Phoenix and Line Islands during the 12th–14th centuries AD.

=== Secondary discovery and mapping of the islands ===
In 1568, when Spanish navigator Álvaro de Mendaña de Neira was commanded to explore the South Pacific, he sailed between the Line Islands and the Phoenix Islands without sighting land, ultimately discovering "Isla de Jesus" (probably one of the islands in the Ellice group).

The oceans of the mid-Pacific and Micronesia opened up to new exploration in the early 19th century as whalers from Europe and the Americas began arriving. An influx of whaling vessels in the 1820s led to the secondary discovery and mapping of the islands between 1821 and 1825. They were the last islands in the Pacific to be fully explored and charted, probably because they were predominantly small, low, and isolated.

While it is clear that early 19th-century whalers were responsible for discovering most of Kiribati in the modern era, it is impossible to confirm exactly who discovered each of the islands due to conflicting reports and inaccurate mapping. Jeremiah N. Reynolds's 1828 report to the American Navy recommended an exploring expedition to the Pacific because "the English charts, and those of other countries are as yet very imperfect. Much of their information has been obtained from loose accounts from whalers who were careless in some instances, and forgetful in others, and which were seized with greediness by the makers of maps and charts, in order to be the first to make these discoveries known."

This proposal came to fruition in the 1840s, when Charles Wilkes led the United States Exploring Expedition, consisting of the USS Peacock and the USS Flying Fish. The expedition surveyed the islands under the direction of William Hudson.

=== Identifying the secondary discoverers ===
Report of JN Reynolds, 1828
Island Name	Location	Reynold's comments
"Phenix Island"^{*}	2°35'S, 171°39'W	"small and sandy, three miles in circumference"
"Mary Balcout's; Island"^{*}	2°47'S, 171°58'W	"Surrounded by a reef twenty leagues in circum- ference, with only four openings where boats can enter" (this is an almost identical position to "Mary Island" shown on Norie's map of 1825; similar to Canton Is.)
"Barney's Island"^{*}	3°9'S, 171°41'W	"a lagoon, twenty miles in circumference" (Possibly another sighting of Canton Is.)
"Birney's Island"	3°30'S, 171°30'W	"Discovered by Capt Emmert; found on charts"
"Sidney's Island"	4°25'S, 171°20'W	"Discovered by Capt Emmert; found on charts"
"Sidney's Is." (2)	4°30'S, 171°20'W	
"Sidney's Is." (3)	4°29'S, 171°20'W	
"New Nantucket"	0°11'N, 176°20'W	"Not on charts"
"Gardner's Island"	4°30'S, 174°22'W	"Not on charts; discovered by Capt Coffin, on Ganges".
unnamed	3°14'S, 170°50'W	
unnamed	3°33'S, 173°44'W	
unnamed	3°35'S, 170°20'W	
unnamed	4°45'S, 174°40'W	
unnamed reef	5°30'S, 175°W	"Not on the charts". (possibly Carondelet Reef)
^{*Reynold's suggests that since these three have similar coordinates, they "are probably the same as Birney's Island"}

Contemporary reports and later analysis provide conflicting evidence regarding the identification of the initial discoverers, a situation only complicated by the numerous names given to each of the atolls.

In 1828, the U.S. Navy commissioned J.N. Reynolds to compile a survey of American discoveries in the South Pacific. Reynolds interviewed several New England whalers and inspected their logbooks, charts, and documents. His report included at least 13 islands that fit roughly within the Phoenix group, but the coordinates he gave do not always compare to the now-established coordinates of that area.

Other contemporary reports of the islands added to the confusion about the details of the initial discoveries. The Frenchman Louis Tromelin reported his 1823 discovery of Phoenix island at 3°42'S, 170°43'W, while cartographer John Arrowsmith plotted it 12 minutes further north; a rediscovery of Sydney is at 4°26'30", 171°18'. The same year, James Coffin recorded "Enderby's Island" at 3°10', 171°10.

The United States Exploring Expedition seems to have been the first to use the name "Phoenix" to refer to the whole island group. It had previously been used only to refer to one of the islands within the group.

==== McKean Island ====
McKean Island was the first of the Phoenix group to be reported and named. It was discovered on May 28, 1794, by a British captain, Henry Barber, of the ship Arthur. Barber named it Drummond's Island, plotting it at 3°40'S, 176°51'W. It was later named Arthur Island and appeared as such in charts of the time and was recorded as located at 3°30'S, 176°0'W. On August 19, 1840, Commander Charles Wilkes of the United States Exploring Expedition mapped it and renamed it McKean Island, after a member of his crew.

==== Enderbury Island ====
Captain James Coffin of the British whaler Transit is credited with having discovered Enderbury Island in 1823 and named it "Enderby's Island" after the London whaling house. However, when Coffin described his discoveries to Arrowsmith and other geographers, he did not mention Enderbury.

==== Birnie Island and Manra (Sydney Island) ====
Birnie and Sydney Islands are reported to have been discovered in 1823 by a "Captain Emmett". This may have been the Captain Emmett (or "Emmert" or "Emment") of the British whaler Sydney Packet (or the Sydney), who may have named the islands after the ship and its owner, the London firm Alexander Birnie & Co. Alternatively, it may have been Captain William Emmett, from Sydney, who sailed regularly in the area and is known to have bought the brig Queen Charlotte from the whaler James Birnie (of the Birnie ship owning family) in 1820. Frenchman Louis Tromelin came upon Sidney's Island, either in 1823 or 1828, and placed it at 4°26'30", 171°18'; he went on to survey Phoenix Island.

==== Canton Island or Kanton or Abariringa ====
Two islands that were reported and charted in 1825 with coordinates similar to those of Canton Island were referred to in those documents as "Mary Island" and "Mary Balcoutts Island". In addition, Reynold's report describes a "Barney's Island" roughly at Canton's position, which may have been named and discovered by Capt. Joseph Barney of Equator, who was whaling in the area in 1823–4. The island was given the name "Canton" in 1872 by Commander Richard W. Meade of USS Narragansett, who named it after the whaling ship Canton, which had been wrecked there in 1854.

==== Nikumaroro (Gardner Island) ====
On January 8, 1824, Capt. Kemin, of an unnamed ship, discovered what may have been Gardner Island (at 4°45'S, 186°20'15"E) and McKean Island, naming them the "Kemin Islands". In 1825, Captain Joshua Gardner, reportedly aboard the whaler Ganges, discovered an island located at 4°20' S, 174°22' W, and named it "Gardner's Island". His discovery was reported in the Nantucket Enquirer in December 1827. However, Joshua Coffin (also reportedly aboard the Ganges) is sometimes credited with the discovery, and is said to have named the island after his ship's owner, Gideon Gardner.

During the United States Exploring Expedition of 1838–1842, Charles Wilkes identified Gardner's Island based on the previously reported position and confirmed its existence.

==== Rawaki (Phoenix Island) ====
The Frenchman Louis Tromelin, aboard the corvette Bayonnaise, came across Phoenix Island (as well as Sydney Island, discussed above), probably in 1828 (but some sources give 1823 as the date). and 1826. Tromelin placed the island at 3°42'S, 189°17'E, and noted his belief that it had already been reported on Norie's map. Reynold's report also mentions an island referred to as "Phenix", as well as other unnamed islands, at similar coordinates. The island's discoverer and the origin of its name are unknown. Still, there are several possible candidates: the whaling ship Phoenix of Nantucket, Massachusetts, which was active in the area and was the discoverer of Winslow Reef; the London whaler Phoenix, owned by Daniel Bennett (W. Bennett & Co), which was whaling in the Pacific in 1815; the Phoenix, under the command of John Palmer in 1824; and another vessel named the Phoenix, under the command of a Captain Moore, which was in the Pacific in 1794.

==== Orona (Hull Island) ====
Little is known about the discovery of Hull Island, but its existence was confirmed by the United States Exploring Expedition in 1841, which found it to be inhabited), and it was named by Charles Wilkes after Commodore Isaac Hull.

==== Winslow Reef ====
The reef was discovered in 1851 by the whaler Phoenix. Perry Winslow was the ship's master on that occasion. Some have speculated this could have been the ship after which the Phoenix Island group is named. Still, several other whaling ships of the time were also named Phoenix, and one of the individual islands in the group had already been reported at an earlier date to bear the name "Phoenix Island".

==== Carondelet Reef ====
Reynold's report of 1828 included an unnamed reef at coordinates similar to those of Carondelet Reef.

==== Baker Island ====
In August 1825, Captain Obed Starbuck of the whaler Loper sighted a low, barren island at 0°11'N, 176°20'W, which he named "New Nantucket" after his home (Nantucket, Massachusetts). Starbuck had previously discovered islands in the Ellice group. The island was later named after Capt. Michael Baker, who had discovered guano deposits on the island in 1839. Today, Baker Island is a United States territory; it is one of the U.S. Minor Outlying Islands.

==== Howland Island ====
Howland Island is a United States territory and one of the U.S. Minor Outlying Islands. The discovery of Howland Island is sometimes credited to Captain George B Worth of the Nantucket whaler Oeno, around 1822, who called it "Worth Island". Daniel MacKenzie of the American whaler Minerva Smith, charted the island in 1828, and, believing it to be a discovery, named it after his ship's owners.

=== Later history ===
Most of the Phoenix Islands were annexed by Great Britain in the late 19th century. The United States claimed Howland and Baker Islands in 1935. In 1937, Britain incorporated all the islands in the Phoenix group, except for Howland and Baker islands, into the Gilbert and Ellice Islands colony. The United States claimed sovereignty over Canton and Enderbury in 1938, but in 1939 agreed with Britain to form the Canton and Enderbury Islands condominium and exercise joint control over the two islands for a term of 50 years. (The agreement continued in force until 1979 when Kiribati's independence nullified it.) During this period of joint U.S.-British control, Canton was extensively developed, first as a seaplane-landing site, then later as a refueling station for trans-Pacific civilian and military aircraft. It remained in use until 1958.

Although shelled and bombed a few times during World War II, neither Canton nor any of the Phoenix Islands was ever occupied by Japanese forces.

Between 1938 and 1940, to reduce overcrowding on the Gilbert Islands, the previously uninhabited Orona (Hull), Manra (Sydney), and Nikumaroro (Gardner) islands were colonized as part of the Phoenix Islands Settlement Scheme. By 1963, however, the settlements on these three islands were deemed to be unworkable, and the entire population was moved to the Solomon Islands.

During the 1960s and early 1970s, the United States used Canton as a missile-tracking station. The island was abandoned in 1976 but then later resettled by members of the I-Kiribati community, who reside there today. In 2008, the government of Kiribati designated the islands the "Phoenix Islands Protected Area", which was at the time the world's largest marine protected area. Collaborations between Kiribati, the New England Aquarium, and Conservation International have allowed scientific expeditions to explore the Phoenix Islands to quantify the ocean's flora and fauna. This area is of particular scientific interest because it has been relatively untouched by human activity.

The Phoenix Islands have been surveyed by TIGHAR in an attempt to determine whether they may have been the landing site of Amelia Earhart and Fred Noonan, who disappeared in 1937 over the central Pacific Ocean near Howland Island while attempting a circumnavigational flight of the globe.

In May 2010, it was reported that a British sailor, Alex Bond, from Penryn, Cornwall, had saved a group of "desperate and starving" Kanton islanders after chancing upon them on his way to Australia. He happened to pull into a lagoon near Canton Island (which is the only habitable island in the Phoenix Islands chain and lies to the northeast of Australia), whereupon he discovered that its 24 residents were destitute. A supply ship expected to bring them food four months earlier had never arrived, and the 10 children and 14 adults had been surviving on fish and coconuts. At the time, Bond was reportedly working for a UK-based disaster-relief charity, ShelterBox, which provides emergency aid to needy people. He contacted the coast guard in Falmouth, England, using his satellite phone, and they, in turn, arranged for the U.S. Coast Guard to send supplies to the islanders from Honolulu, Hawaii.

== See also ==
- Kiribati
- Phoenix Islands Settlement Scheme
- Under a Jarvis Moon, a 2010 documentary film
