= Winslow Reef, Phoenix Islands =

Underwater feature of the Phoenix Islands, Republic of Kiribati

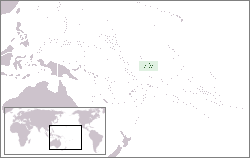
- Location of Phoenix Islands

- Location within Pacific Ocean
- Summit depth: 11 m (36 ft)

Location
- Location: central Pacific Ocean
- Group: Phoenix Islands
- Coordinates: 01°36′S 174°57′W
- Country: Kiribati

Geology
- Type: Reef

History
- Discovery date: November 9, 1840
- Discovered by: Michael Baker

Winslow Reef is an underwater feature of the Phoenix Islands, Republic of Kiribati, located 200 kilometres (120 mi) north-northwest of McKean Island at 01°36′S 174°57′W. It is the northernmost and westernmost feature of the Phoenix Islands, not counting the outlying Baker and Howland Islands. It has a least depth of 11 m (36 ft). The reef is about 1.6 km (1 mi) long east–west, and about half that wide. The bottom is pink coral and red sand.

== History ==
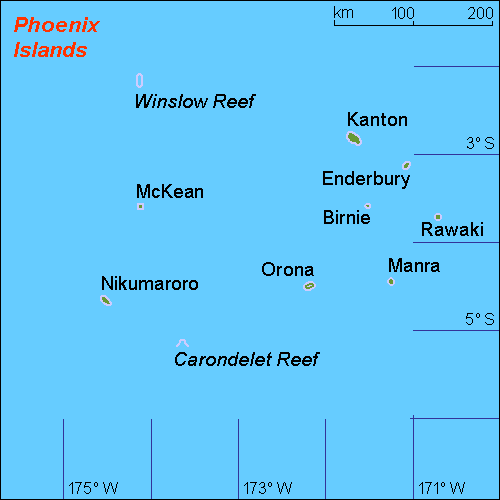
Winslow Reef at northwest of Phoenix group

Winslow Reef is mentioned by Robert Louis Stevenson, who sailed over an area thought to be Winslow Reef in late 1889, but did not find it.

For long it had been thought that a Perry Winslow (1815-1890), Capt. of the Nantucket whaler Phoenix, was its discoverer in 1851 and that the name of his ship also became attached to the entire group of islands. Entry November 9, 1840, of the log of whaler “Gideon Howland” of New Bedford, Capt. Michael Baker (1802-1860)], however, might suffice as evidence to an even earlier sighting, an entire decade earlier: "Monday 9th, fine weather light trades all hands severely engaged doing nothing. At 11 AM passed over a reef apparently not more than ... 5 or 6 fathoms of water on it in Lat 1° 36 S Longitude 175° 24 W Lat Meridian..."

The etymology behind the toponym Phoenix Islands is likely more indebted to the British whaler Phœnix of London, Capt. John Palmer, than it is to Perry Winslow's ship with the same name, because on February 23, 1824, the former captain had spotted a low and sandy island covered with “tropical birds, men of war hawks and other sea fowl in latitude 3° 39′ South and Longitude 170° 30′ West." This was no doubt modern Rawaki. It was named “Phœnix Island” that day, after the whale ship. The Phœnix was merely one of many ships owned by the firm Daniel Bennett & Son, the largest whaling merchant of its day.

It is part of the Phoenix Islands Protected Area and is, therefore, a protected nature reserve.

The Winslow Reef borders the U.S. Howland-Baker EEZ. The PacIOOS mentions that Winslow Reef is "on the southeast boundary line of the EEZ".

== See also ==
- List of Guano Island claims
- Carondelet Reef
