= Carondelet Reef =

Horseshoe-shaped reef of the Phoenix Islands in the Republic of Kiribati

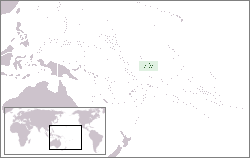
- Location of Phoenix Islands
- Summit depth: 1.8 m (5 ft 11 in)

Location
- Location: central Pacific Ocean
- Group: Phoenix Islands
- Coordinates: 05°34′S 173°51′W
- Country: Kiribati

Geology
- Type: Reef

History
- Discovery date: August 31, 1898
- Discovered by: Capt. Wilder F. Stetson

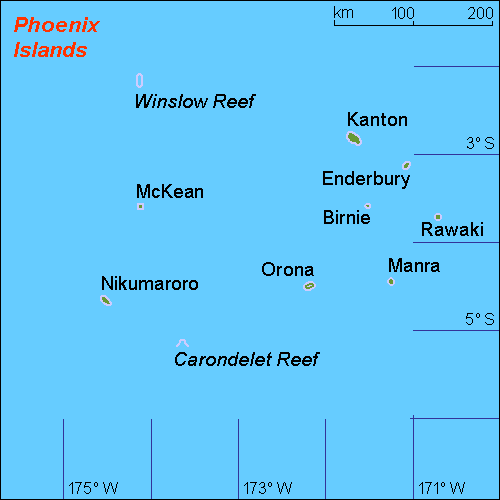
Carondelet Reef at south of Phoenix group

Carondelet Reef is a horseshoe-shaped reef, presumably a submerged atoll formation, of the Phoenix Islands, also known as the Rawaki Islands, in the Republic of Kiribati. It is located 106 kilometres (57 nmi; 66 mi) southeast of Nikumaroro, at 05°34′S 173°51′W, and has a least depth of 1.8 metres (5.9 ft). It is reported to be approximately 1.5 kilometres (0.9 mi) in length. The sea occasionally breaks over it.

== History ==
According to Admiral Adam Johann von Krusenstern, a Captain Kemin of an unidentified ship reported the discovery of a reef in position 05°38′S 172°54′W in 1824, and this may have been the first sighting of Carondelet Reef by a Westerner. The next Westerner to see it may have been Captain Obed Starbuck of the Nantucket whaler Loper, who reported a "reef of rocks" at position 05°29′S 175°01′W on February 19, 1826.

During a voyage from Puget Sound to Australia, Captain Wilder Farley Stetson (1849–1924) of the ship Carondelet sighted a reef on August 31, 1898, from position 05°35′S 173°58′W. He was within 2 nautical miles (3.7 km; 2.3 mi) of it and considered it very dangerous. He named it Carondelet Reef, after his ship.

The multiple positions of Winslow Reef mentioned by Robert Louis Stevenson may have been due to confusion of the position of Carondelet Reef with that of Winslow Reef.

== Status ==
The reef is part of the Phoenix Islands Protected Area, an underwater nature reserve.

== See also ==
- List of Guano Island claims
