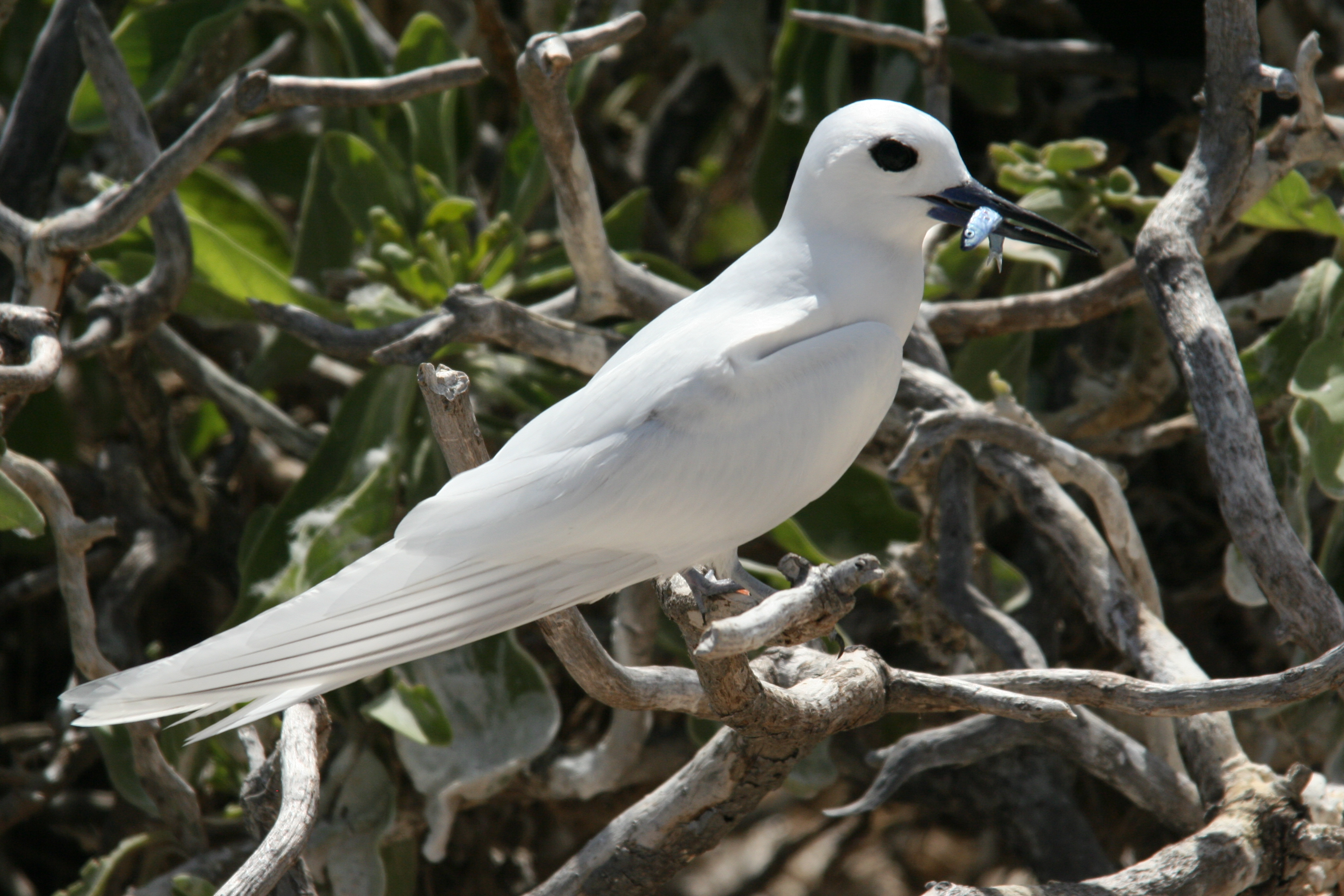
- White Tern (Gygis alba) with prey, Tern Island, French Frigate Shoals

Scientific classification
- Kingdom: Animalia
- Phylum: Arthropoda
- Subphylum: Chelicerata
- Class: Arachnida
- Order: Ixodida
- Family: Ixodidae
- Genus: Ixodes
- Species: I. amersoni

Binomial name
- Ixodes amersoni Kohls, 1966

= Ixodes amersoni =

Species of arachnid

Ixodes amersoni is a species of tick found on sea birds in the Pacific Ocean. It was identified in 1966 on Rawaki by a member of the Pacific Ocean Biological Survey. The female was identified as a parasite of Gygis alba, and the male, nymph, and larva have not been identified.

Due to its isolation and the frequency of misidentifications, Ixodes amersoni is poorly described in literature. In 2012, it was reported that two additional female specimens of the tick were collected in the Kermadec Islands of New Zealand.
