= Sydney Packet =

Sydney Packet may refer to:

- Sydney Packet (1814 ship) (or Sidney Packet), was an American ship, taken in prize c. 1814 under another name, condemned, and sold to Alexander Birnie & Co. She sailed to New South Wales, and then made three voyages as a whaler. She was lost in 1826.
- Sydney Packet, Bunker, master, foundered at sea in November 1816 while sailing from New South Wales to London. Her crew were saved and taken into the Brazils.
- Sydney Packet (1826–1837), a two-masted schooner of 84 tons, built in Sydney, Australia, in 1826 and captained by James Bruce; later purchased by John Jones (1809–1869), and outfitted as a bay whaler; wrecked at Moeraki, Otago, 17 July 1837.
