= Phoenix Islands Protected Area =

Marine protected area in central Kiribati

Coordinates: 3°38′59″S 172°51′27″W

- PIPA
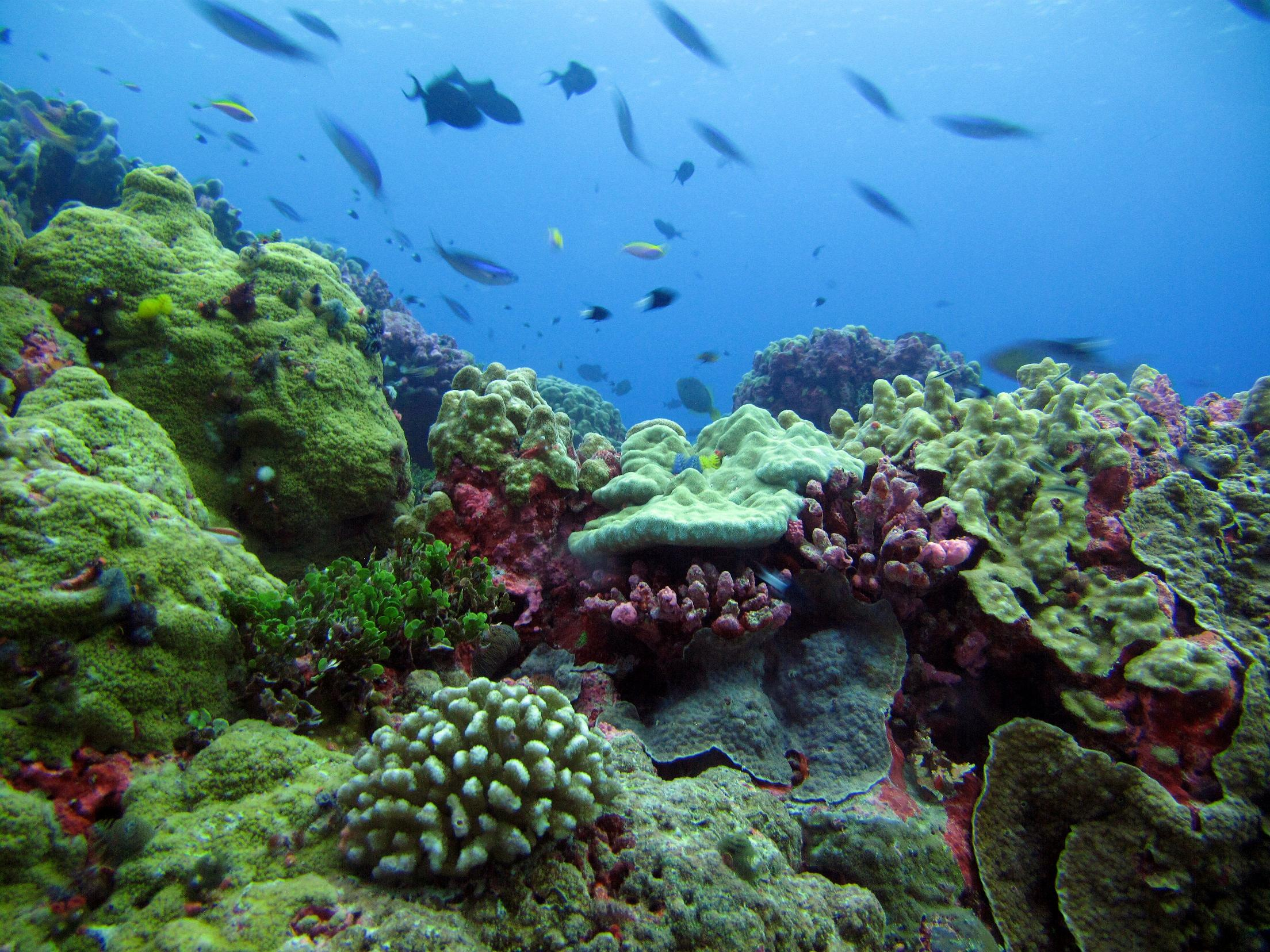
- PIPA represents one of Earth’s last intact oceanic coral archipelago ecosystems, with reefs being what a reef might have looked like one thousand years ago.

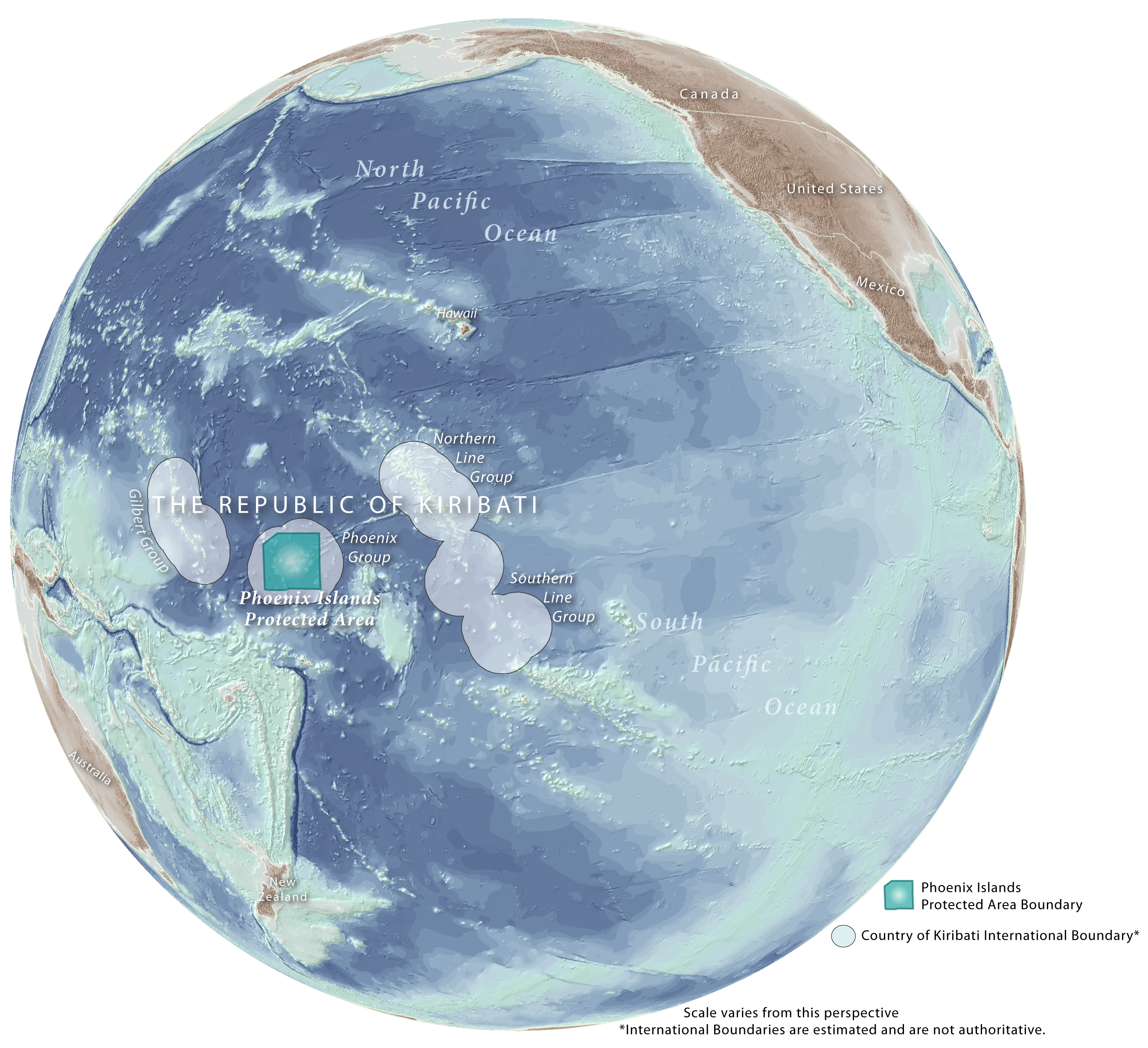
- Phoenix Islands Protected Area boundary outlined
- Location: Phoenix Islands
- Area: 408,250 km^{2} (157,630 sq mi)
- Established: January 2008
- Governing body: Republic of Kiribati
- Website: https://whc.unesco.org/en/list/1325/

UNESCO World Heritage Site
- Type: Natural
- Criteria: vii, ix
- Designated: 2010 (34th session)
- Reference no.: 1325
- Region: Asia-Pacific

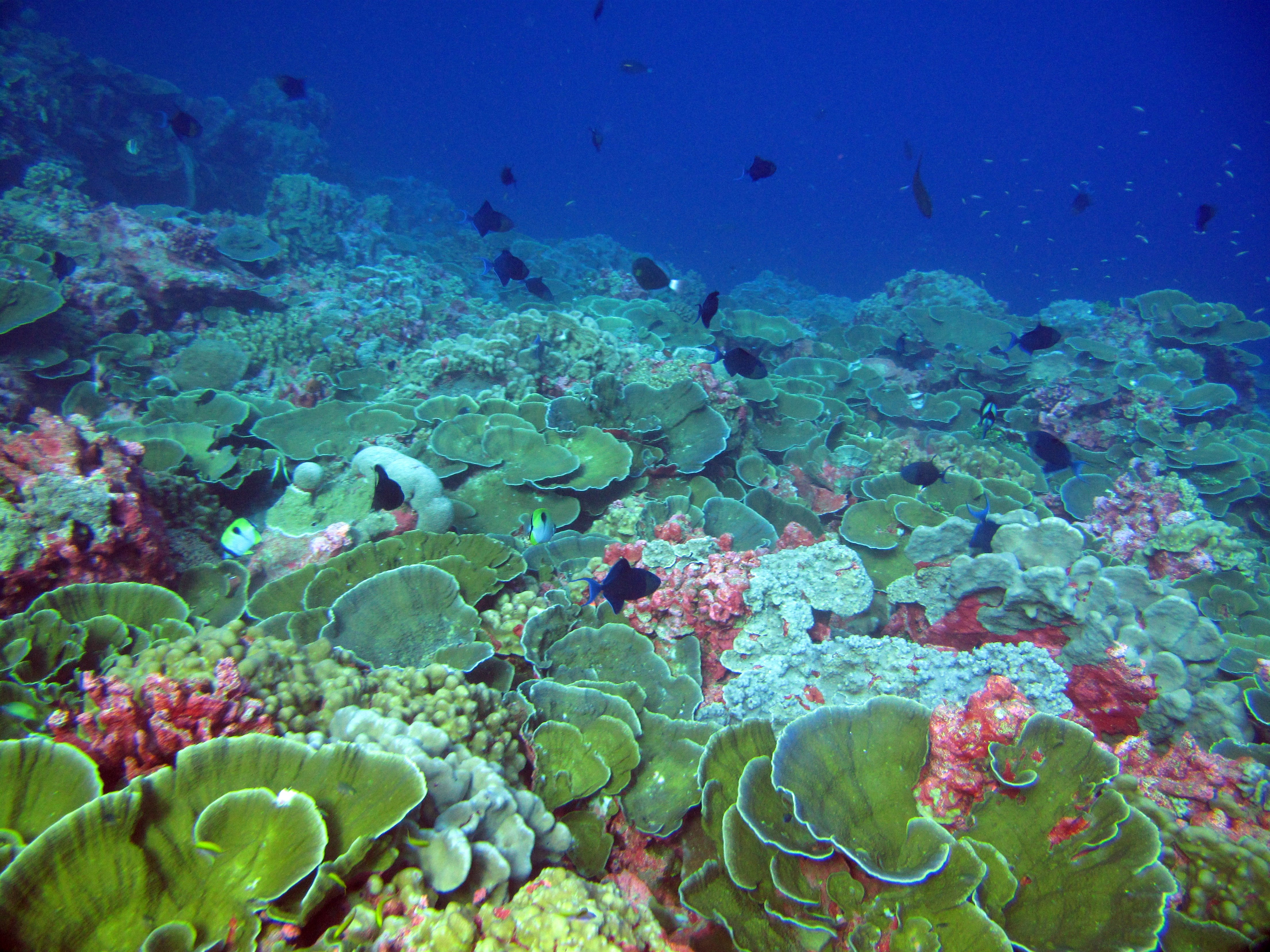
Enderbury Island, Phoenix Islands Protected Area

The Phoenix Islands Protected Area (PIPA) is located in the Republic of Kiribati, an ocean nation in the central Pacific approximately midway between Australia and Hawaii. PIPA constitutes 11.34% of Kiribati's exclusive economic zone (EEZ), and with a size of 408,250 km^{2} (157,630 sq mi), it is one of the largest marine protected areas (MPA) and one of the largest protected areas of any type (land or sea) on Earth. The PIPA was also designated as the world's largest and deepest UNESCO World Heritage Site in 2010.

The PIPA conserves one of the world's largest intact oceanic coral archipelago ecosystems, includes 14 known underwater seamounts (presumed to be extinct volcanoes) and other deep-sea habitats. The area contains approximately 800 known species of fauna, including about 200 coral species, 500 fish species, 18 marine mammals and 44 bird species. In total it is equivalent to the size of the state of California in the US, though the total land area is only 25 km^{2} (9.7 sq mi). To the north of the PIPA is the U.S. administered Pacific Islands Heritage Marine National Monument that is currently the world's largest designated MPA.

== History and administration ==
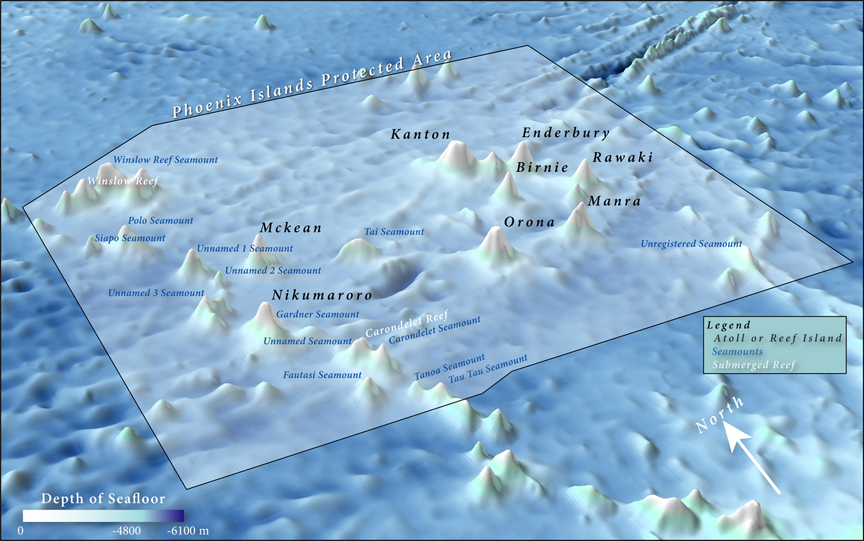
The Phoenix Islands Protected Area is a mostly uninhabited coral archipelago located within a globally biologically important area called the Polynesian-Micronesian hotspot.

The Republic of Kiribati, in partnership with the non-governmental conservation organizations Conservation International and the New England Aquarium, has formed the Phoenix Island Protected Area Conservation Trust (PIPA Trust). In 2018, the New England Aquarium resigned as a partner and the Aquarium of the Pacific joined the PIPA Trust Board.

Management and protection requirements necessary to maintain the values of this MPA are reflected both in the current interim management measures and the recently approved management plan. These include, but are not limited to, the following:

- Zonation
- Permits

The administrators of the reserve had been criticized for the amount of fishing they allowed prior to full closure on January 1, 2015. As of Jan 1, 2015, all commercial extractive activities (including tuna fishing) are prohibited throughout the MPA. Only a small sustainable-use zone around Canton Island allows for limited activities to support the resident population. In the PIPA Management Plan 2015–2020, which was implemented following a Kiribati government decision in January 2014, there is a total ban on commercial fishing within the PIPA boundaries including the territorial sea (to 12 nm) and all lagoons of the 8 PIPA islands, (Kanton, Manra, Rawaki, Birnie, McKean, Enderbury, Nikumaroro and Orona) to ensure there is no impact to marine and terrestrial species including habitats.

In November 2021, it was announced that the Kiribati government would terminate the protected area to boost tuna fishing. The area was officially reopened to commercial fishing in 2023.

== Natural heritage ==
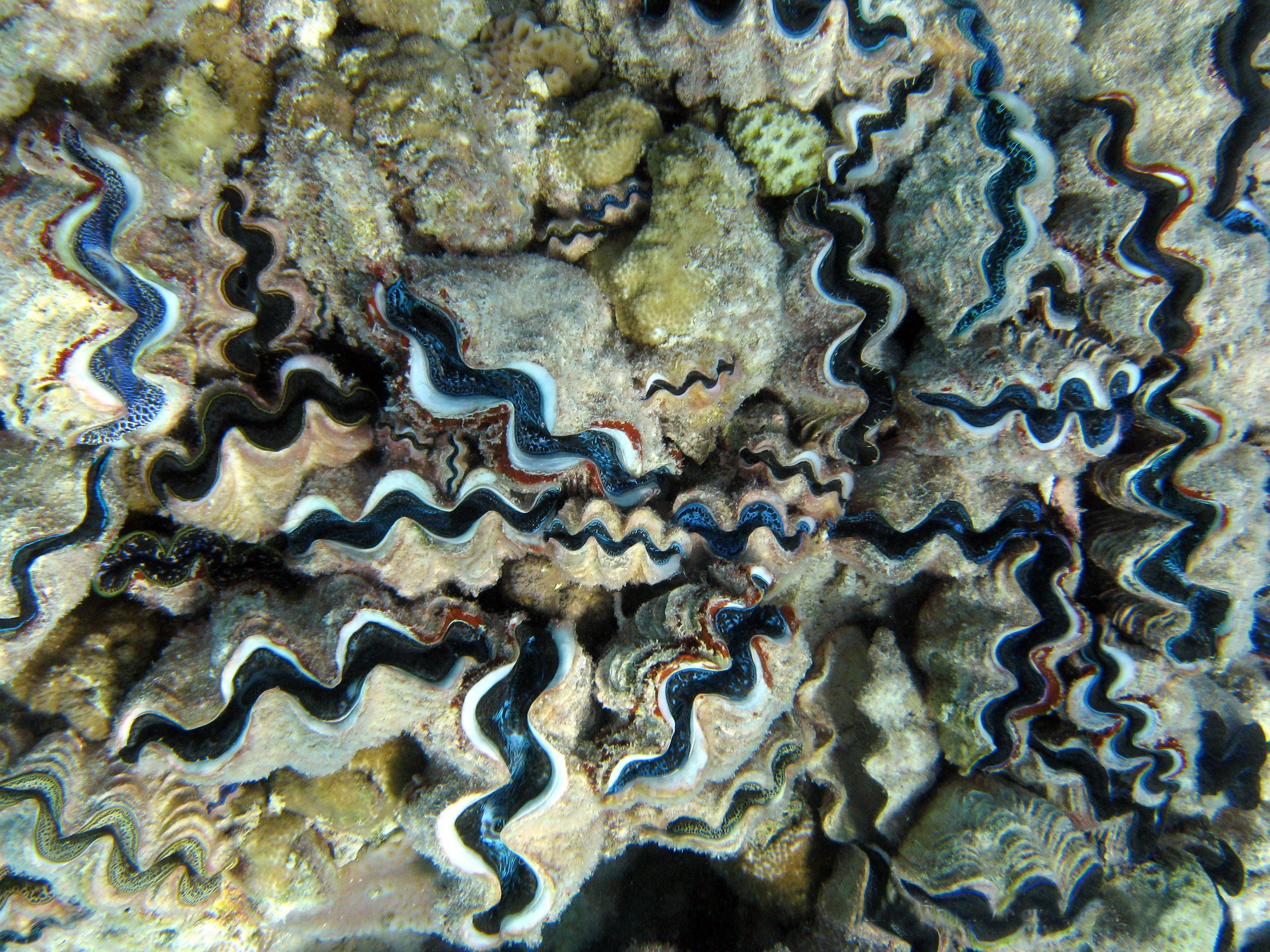
Tridacna giant clams in the lagoon of Orona

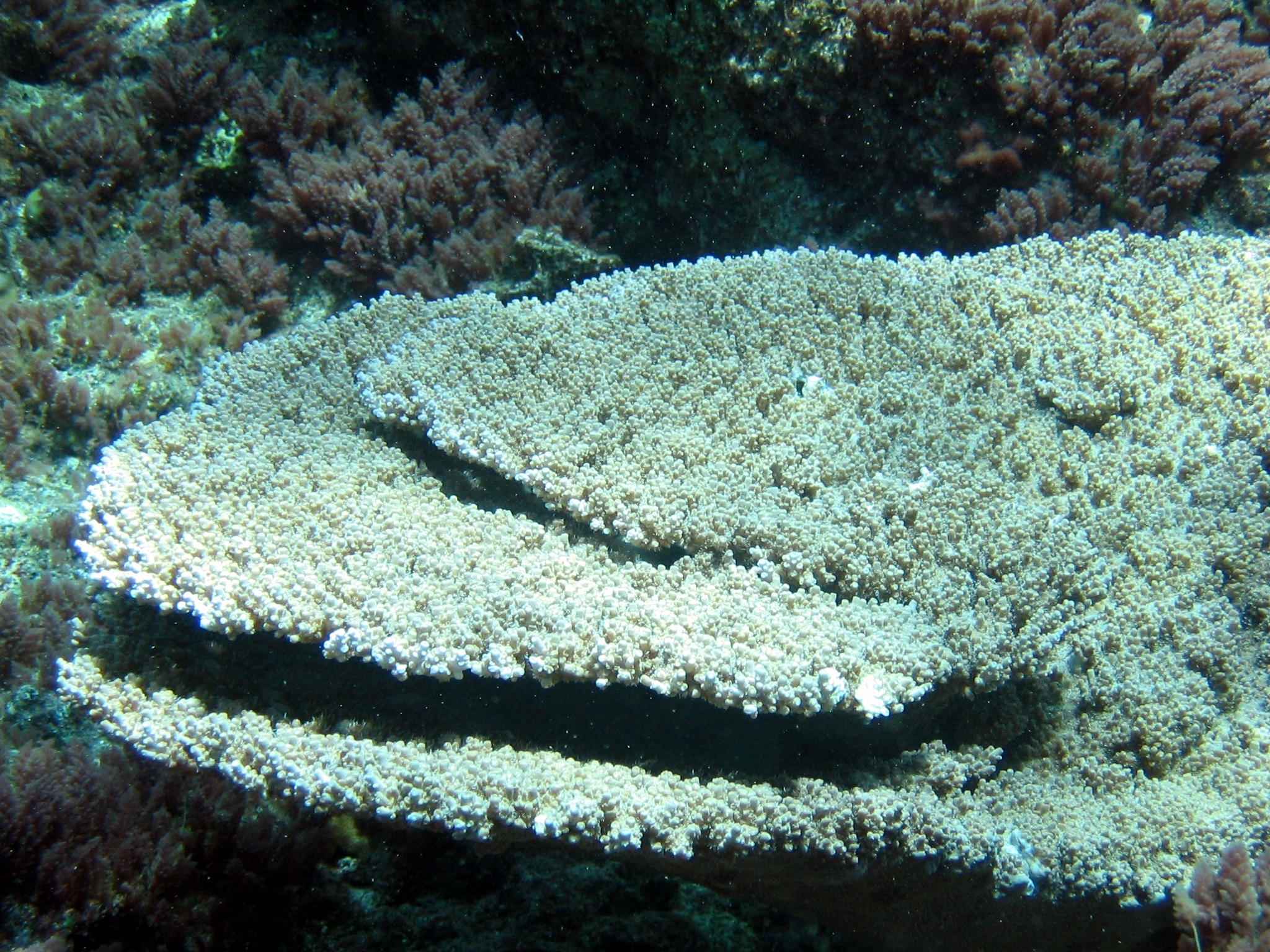
Acropora cytherea

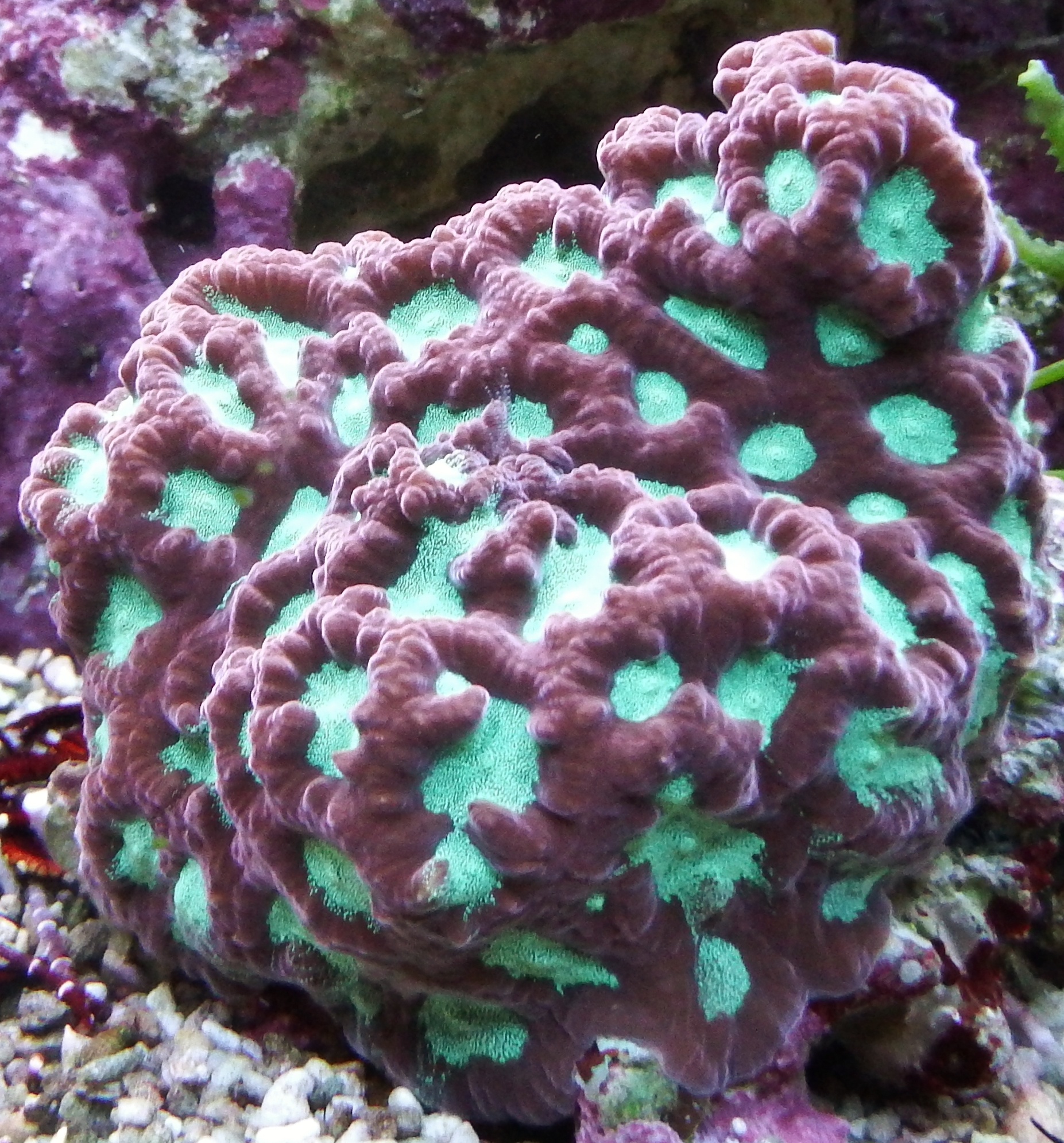
Favites pentagona

There are three atolls with associated lagoons and perimeter coral reefs in the PIPA (Orona (Hull), Nikumaroro (Gardner), and Kanton (Aba-Riringa)), and five low islands surrounded by fringing reefs (Manra (Sydney), Rawaki (Phoenix), McKean, Birnie and Enderbury), and also two submerged reefs (Winslow and Carondelet). The area contains seven main habitats: island, lagoon, coral reef, deep reef, sea mount, deep benthos, and open ocean, which are all represented within the protected zone.

The 2000 surveys (Obura, et al.) in the Phoenix Islands (Orona (Hull), Nikumaroro (Gardner), and Kanton (Aba-Riringa)), five low reef islands surrounded by coral reefs (Manra (Sydney), Rawaki (Phoenix), McKean and Enderbury) identify that, at the time of these surveys, the reefs were in an excellent state of health, and free from the bleaching that has plagued reefs in other parts of the Pacific with no evidence of any coral diseases.

The coral reefs of the Phoenix Islands were notable for their moderate Live Coral Cover (LCC) of 20-40% and evidence of high physical breakage of coral by wave energy on the southern, eastern and northern reefs of the islands, which create coral rubble in the lagoons and base of the reefs. The dominant bottom cover of the lagoons was hard coral (36.0%), followed by coralline algae (red algae) (18.0%), coral rubble (16.7%), turf and fleshy algae (11.6%) and Halimeda (green macroalgae) (10.4%). The dominance of coral and coralline algae indicates healthy reef ecosystems dominated by calcifying organisms and active reef framework growth. The effect of exposure to storms is indicated by the dominance trends with storm resistant encrusting/submassive forms in windward sites, its somewhat lower abundance at leeward sites and a corresponding increase in more delicate plate forms, and the dominance of the more fragile table and staghorn corals in protected lagoon sites. Coral species diversity is higher on the larger islands of Nikumaroro, Kanton and Orona, which indicates the importance of the larger area of reef on these islands for support of biodiversity. Carpeting soft corals (Sinularia and Lobophytum) were found at the bottom of the lagoons of Kanton and Orona, which are the only true lagoons in the Phoenix Islands.

Crown-of-thorns starfish (Acanthaster planci), cushion star and other coral predators, such as the corallivorous snail Drupella spp., are found on the reefs of the Phoenix Islands, although there has not been any indication of destructive outbreaks of those predators on the reefs.

Species of giant clam (Tridacna) occur in low numbers: Tridacna squamosa; Tridacna maxima; but not Tridacna gigas.

Two submerged reefs, Winslow and Carondelet, and at least 14 known seamounts together with open ocean and deep-sea habitat are an integral part of the PIPA. The New England Aquarium (NEAq), Boston University (BU), Woods Hole Oceanographic Institution, Sea Education Association (SEA), and Schmidt Ocean Institute have carried out scientific research expeditions of these seamount habitats, which have been identified being rich in deep-water coral and biodiversity supporting a variety of oceanic pelagic species. PIPA has been identified as an important feeding and spawning site for the tuna species. The dominant taxonomic group in the deep sea across all depths were the octocorals, followed by antipatharians, scleractinians, and then zoantharians.

== Impact of iron leaching from shipwrecks and anchor gear ==
The PIPA is in a naturally iron poor region. The introduction of iron to this environment from shipwrecks and anchor gear, is linked to proliferation of turf algae and benthic bacterial communities, and degraded ‘black reefs’. Monitoring from 2000 to 2015 recorded the black reef originating at the 1929 wreck of the SS Norwich City on Nikumaroro progressing northward to sites 1 kilometre (0.6 mi) away. The 2015 expedition to the PIPA recorded the presence of black reefs on five atolls (Enderbury, Kanton, Nikumaroro, McKean, Rawaki) and on Carondelet seamount associated with shipwreck debris. No recovery has been documented at black reefs observed between 2005 and 2015.

== Island restoration and biosecurity program ==
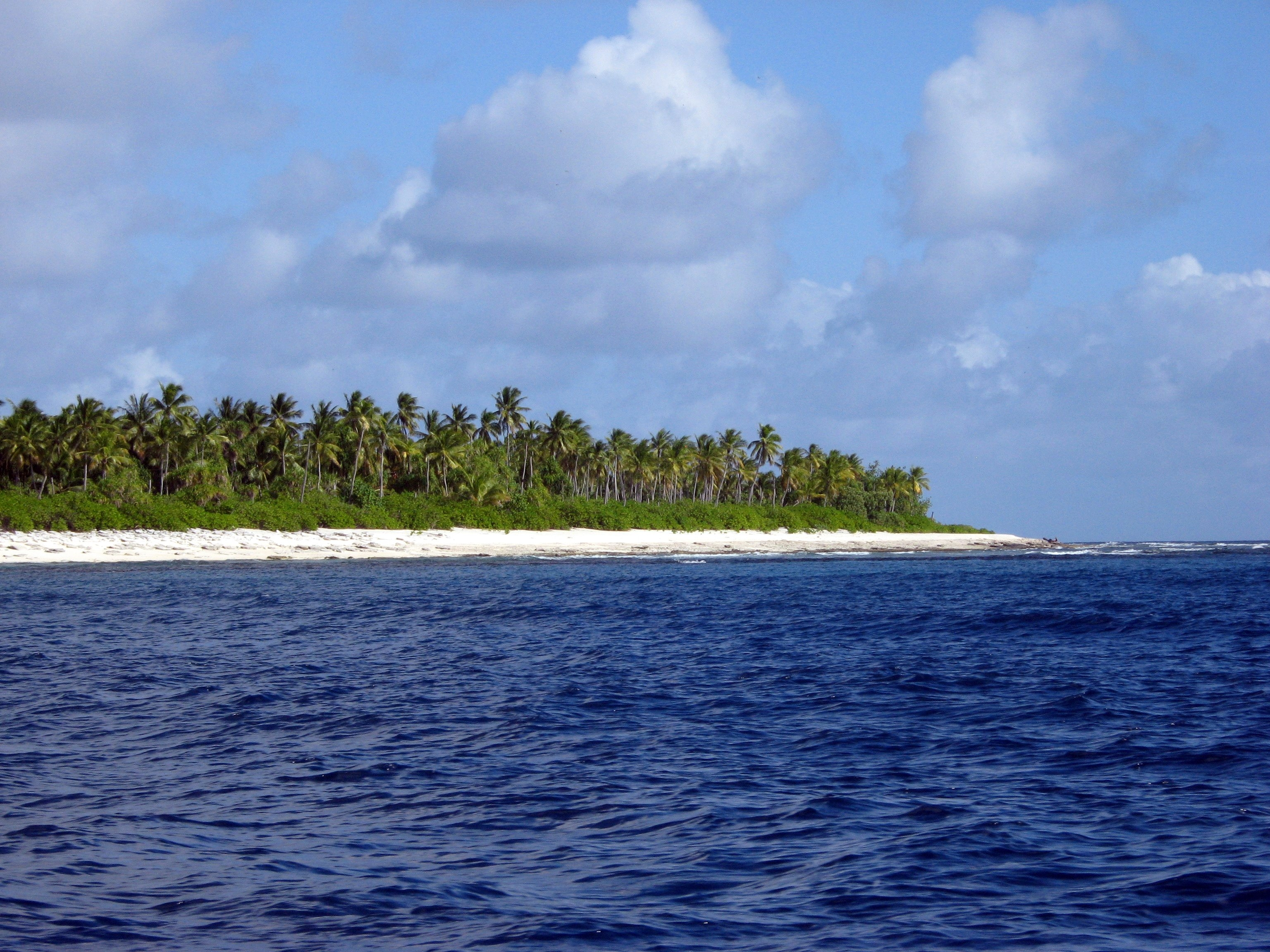
Restoration goals in PIPA include eradicating non-native cats from Orona Island that are decimating bird populations.

Five of the eight islands in PIPA are currently designated as Important Bird Areas by Birdlife International. Today there are 19 species of seabirds living on the islands. Many other seabirds migrate through PIPA, including shearwaters and mottled petrels from Australia and New Zealand. Prominent species include the endemic, endangered Phoenix petrel.

Some of the negative impacts of the introduction of non-native, invasive plants and animals include the elimination of native seabirds and plants, particularly through the destruction of the eggs and young, and introduced plants taking over other plant life, modifying the natural island ecosystem. Plants and animals that have been introduced over time include Pacific and Asian rats, rabbits, cats, ants, pigs, dogs and lantana.

Until PIPA was declared, the last comprehensive fauna surveys of the Phoenix Islands occurred in the 1960s. In 2006 a new survey was conducted to determine the extent of non-native pest species invasions on each island and the feasibility of a restoration program. From this work it was determined that pests - especially the feral rabbits on Rawaki Island and Asian rats on McKean Island - should be removed from the Phoenix Islands.

Sometime around the year 2002, Asian rats colonized McKean, apparently when a fishing trawler was wrecked on the island. The 2006 survey found that rat predation had virtually destroyed the once abundant populations of storm-petrels, blue noddies and other petrels and shearwaters. Rabbits on Rawaki were competing for and generally damaging necessary resources for the birds, as well as trampling nests.

As a first step towards biodiversity recovery on the islands of the PIPA, in mid 2008 rats and rabbits were targeted on McKean and Rawaki. In November–December 2009 a check of these islands by a science team indicated that the eradication programs were successful. The responses from the plant life and bird life were spectacular with the team finding that seabirds were nesting successfully on McKean for the first time in nearly 10 years. Meanwhile, on Rawaki the vegetation recovery has enabled birds like blue noddies to find suitable nest sites throughout the island. Even frigatebirds were nesting on the now recovering plants. These restoration efforts will enable populations of Phoenix petrel, white-throated storm petrel, and other important seabird populations to recover in the PIPA. A second eradication expedition was successfully executed in July 2011, with two additional islands of the PIPA, Ender bury and Birnie, targeted for pest removal. Both islands had populations of the non-native Pacific rat.

== Gallery ==
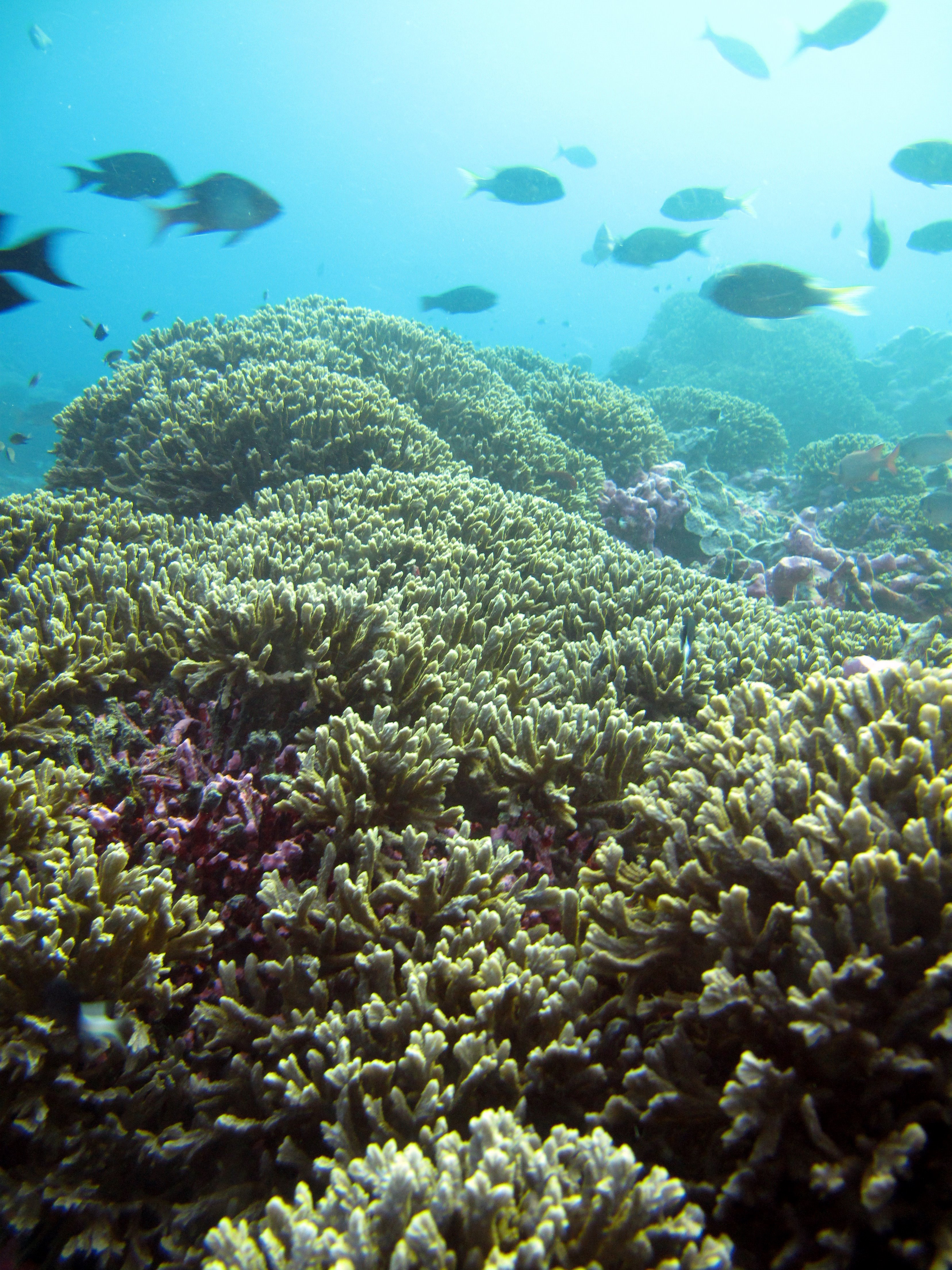
Hydrophore rigida corals in PIPA

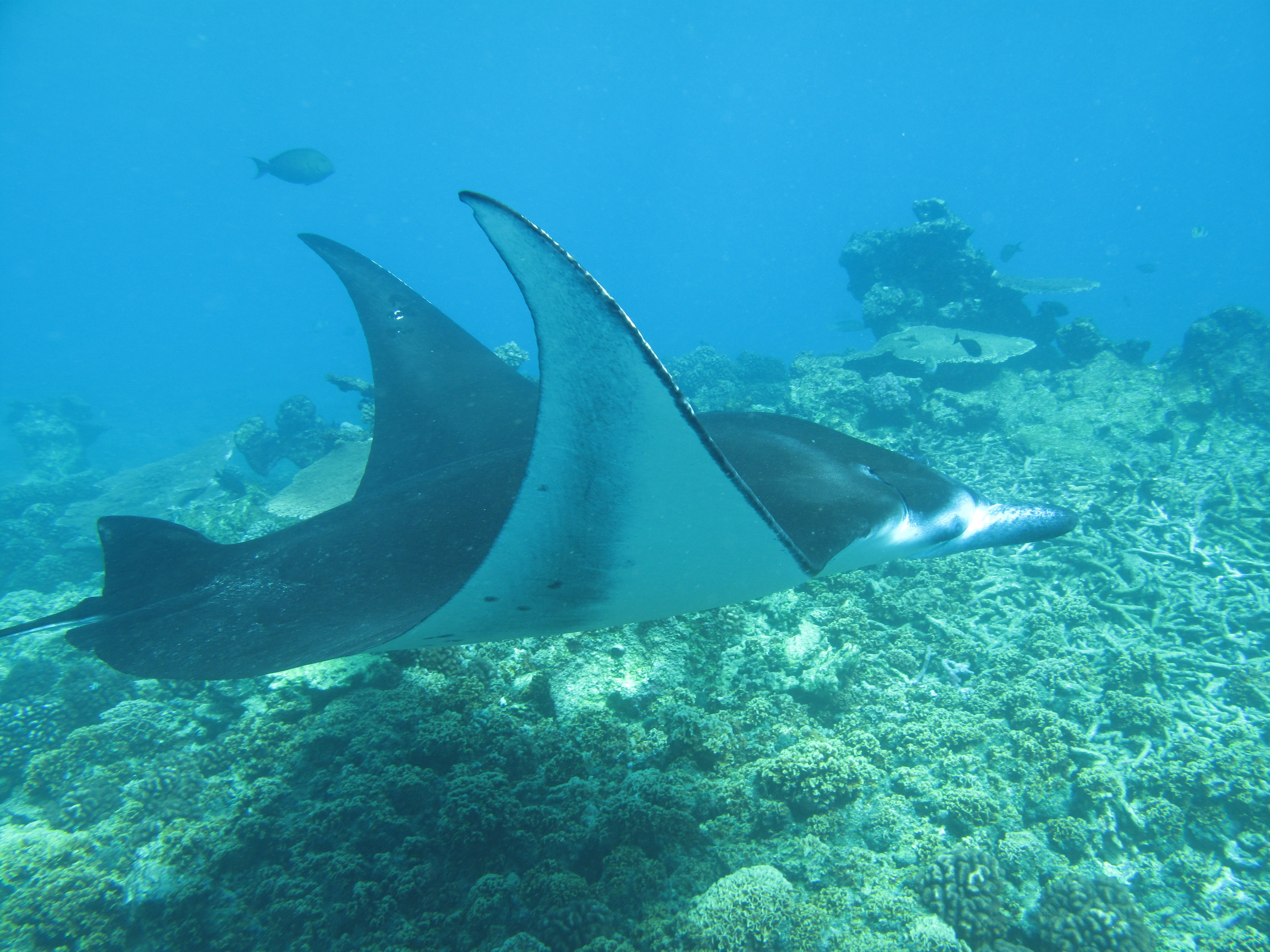
Fish in Phoenix Islands Protected Area

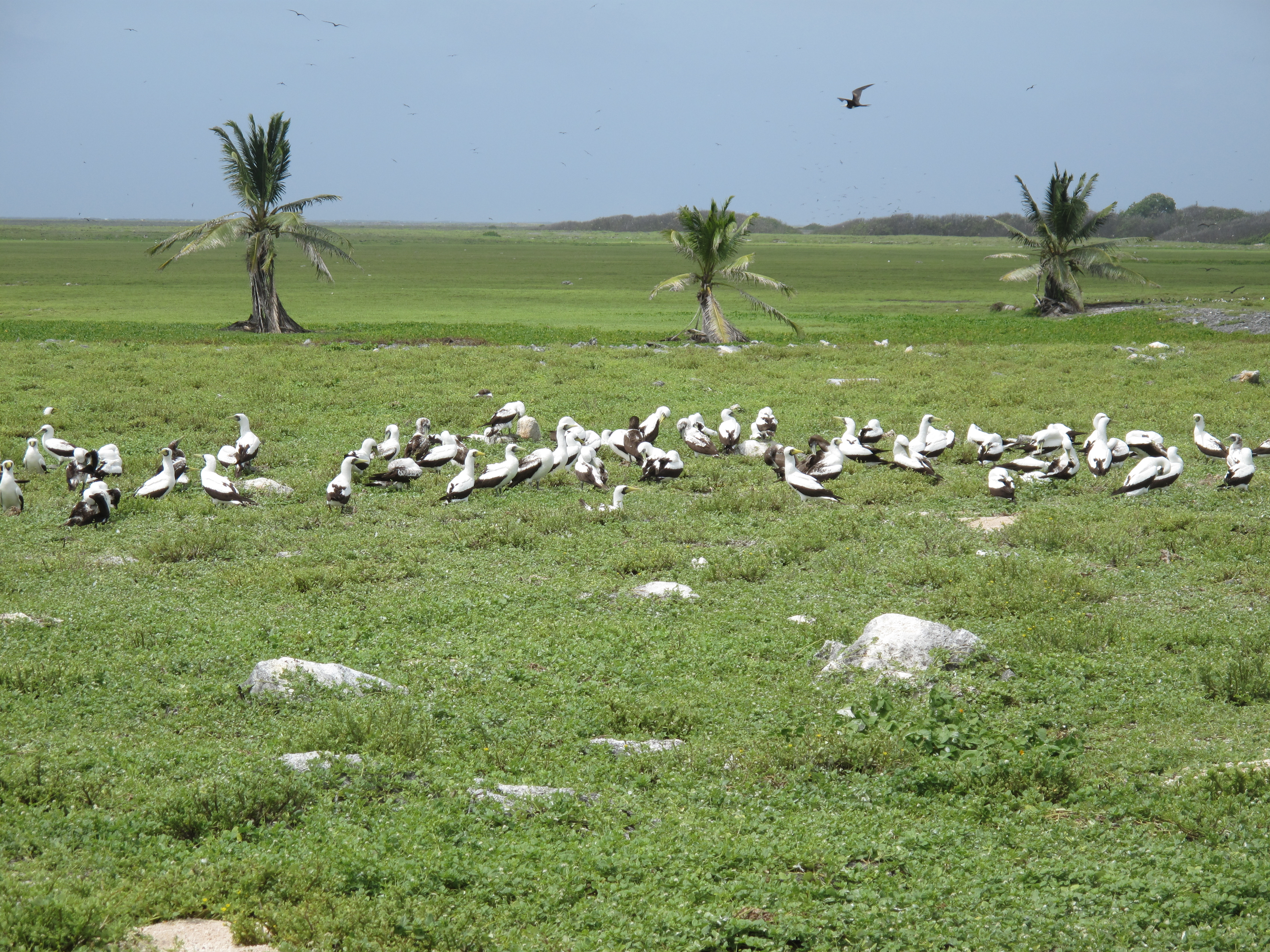
Masked boobies

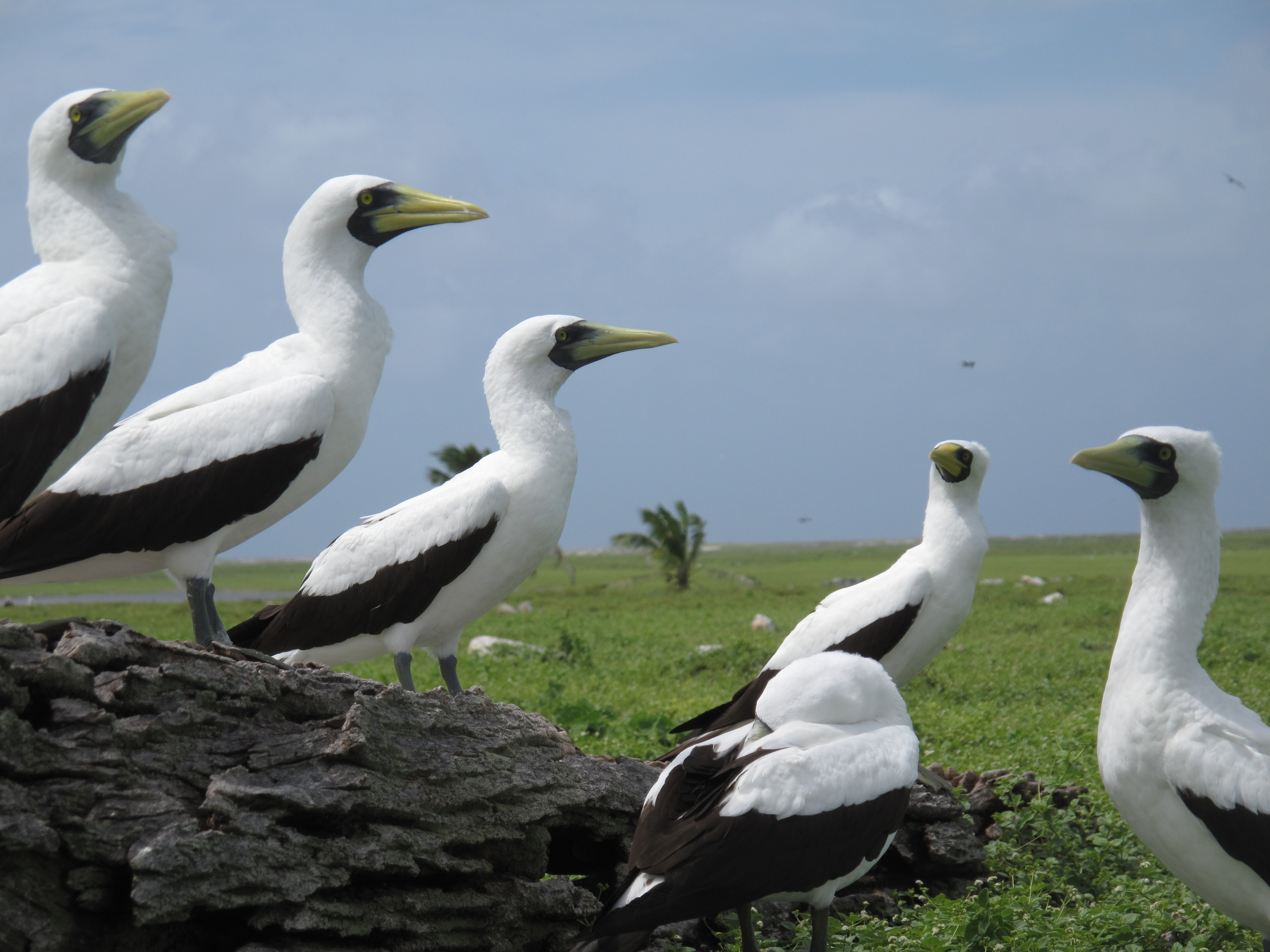
Masked boobies in Phoenix Islands Protected Area

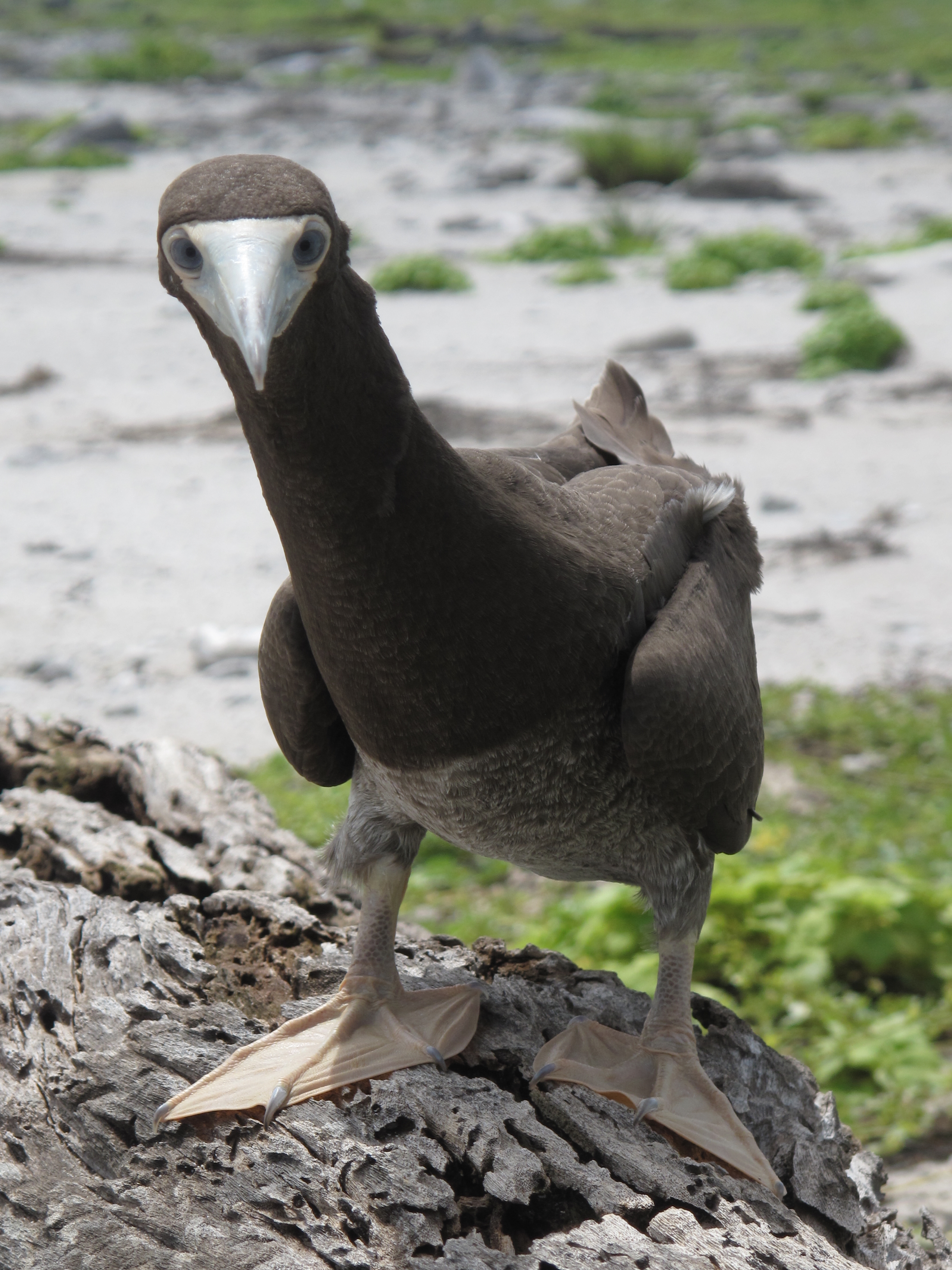
Juvenile brown booby in Phoenix Islands Protected Area

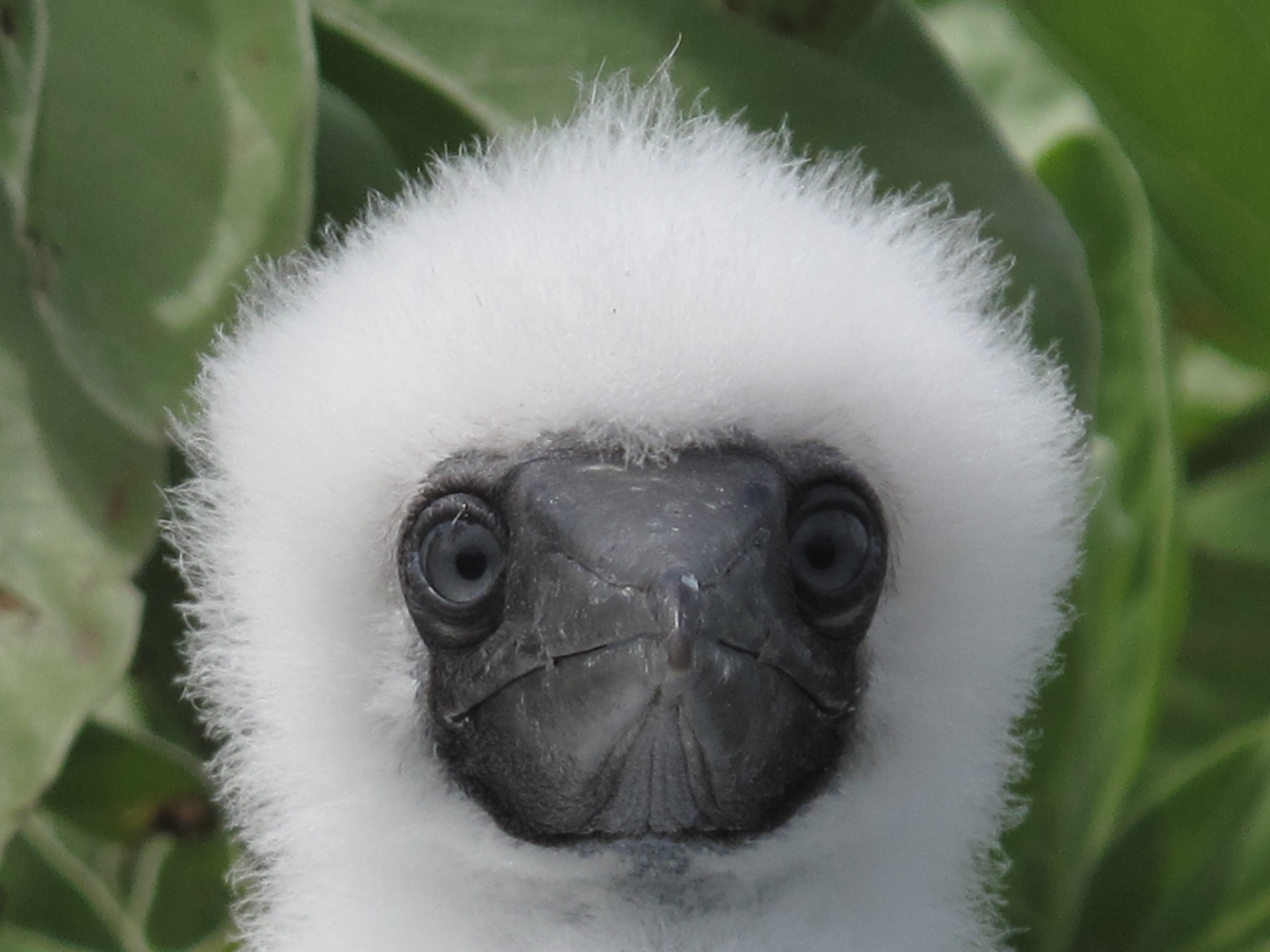
Juvenile booby in Phoenix Islands Protected Area

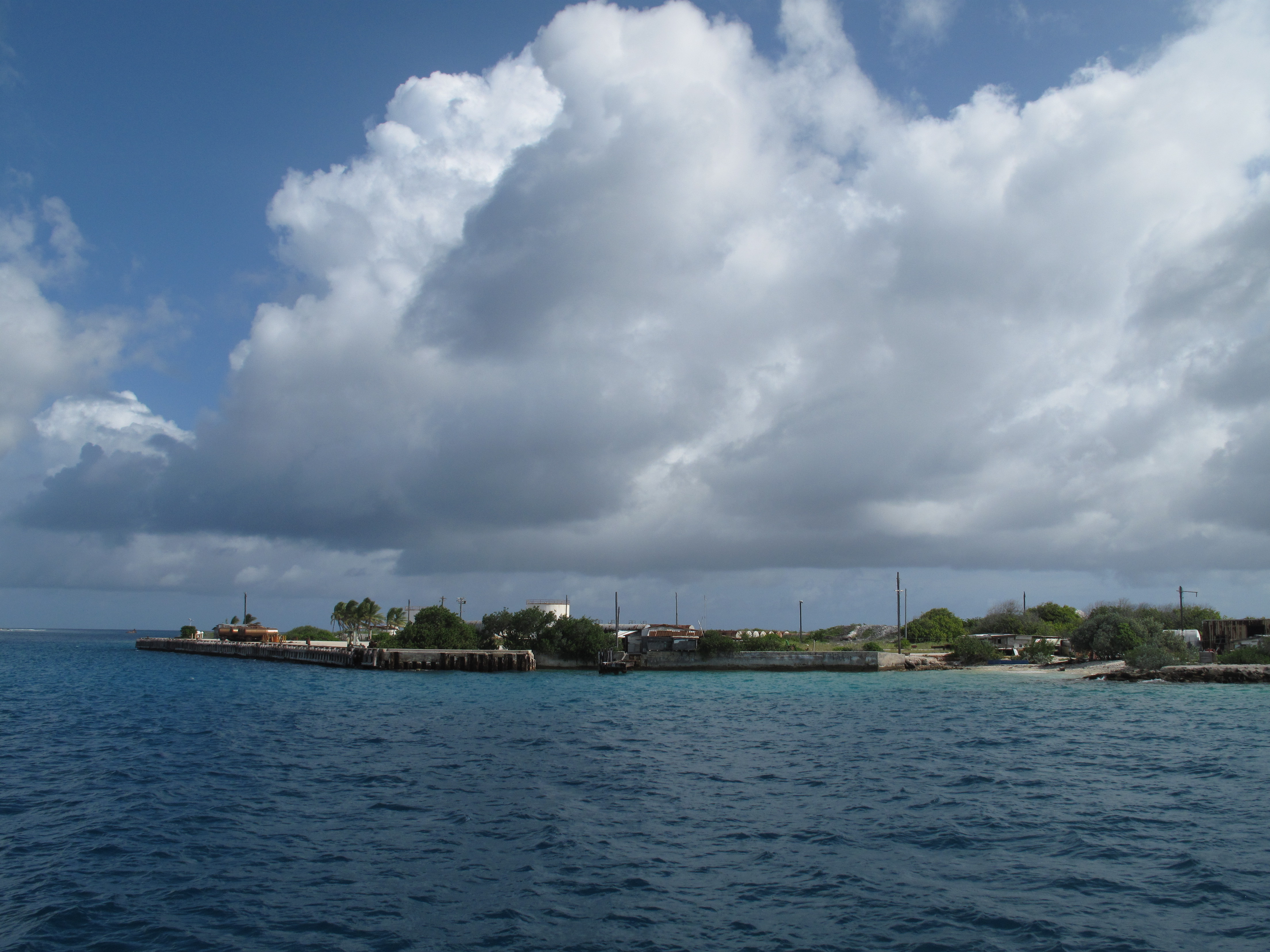
Phoenix Islands

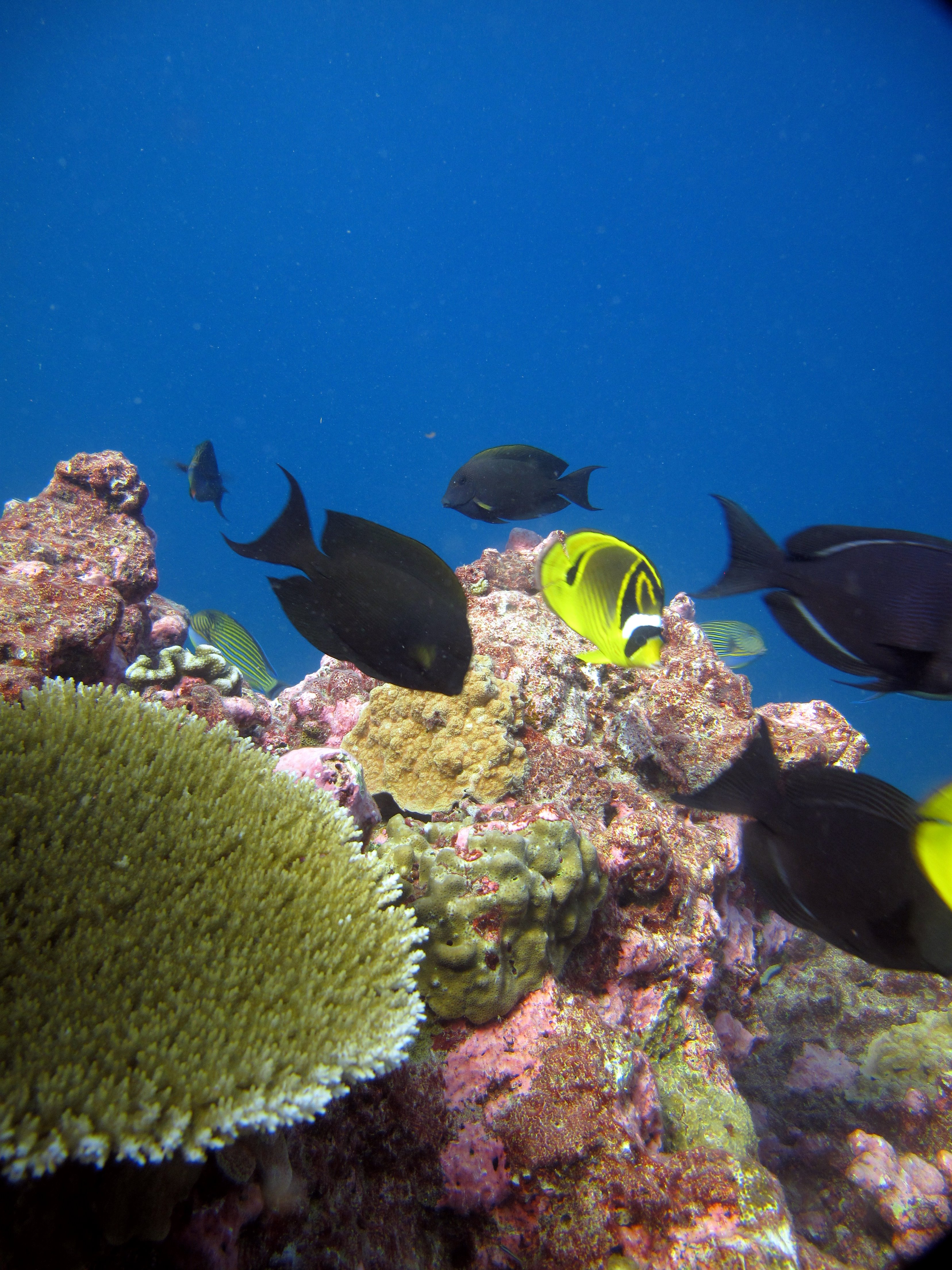
Kanton Island, in the Phoenix Islands Protected Area (Kiribati)

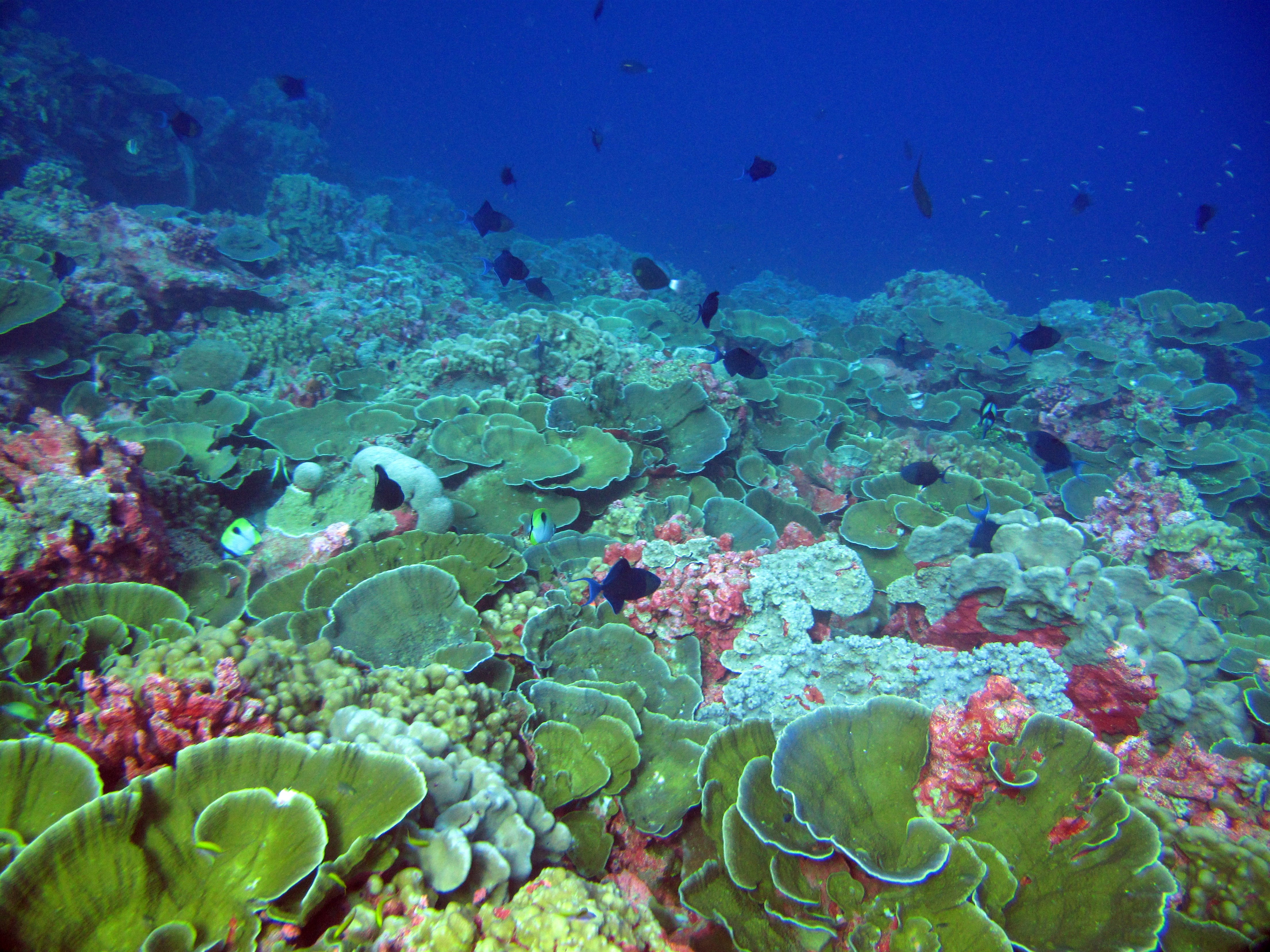
Enderbury Island, in the Phoenix Islands Protected Area (Kiribati)

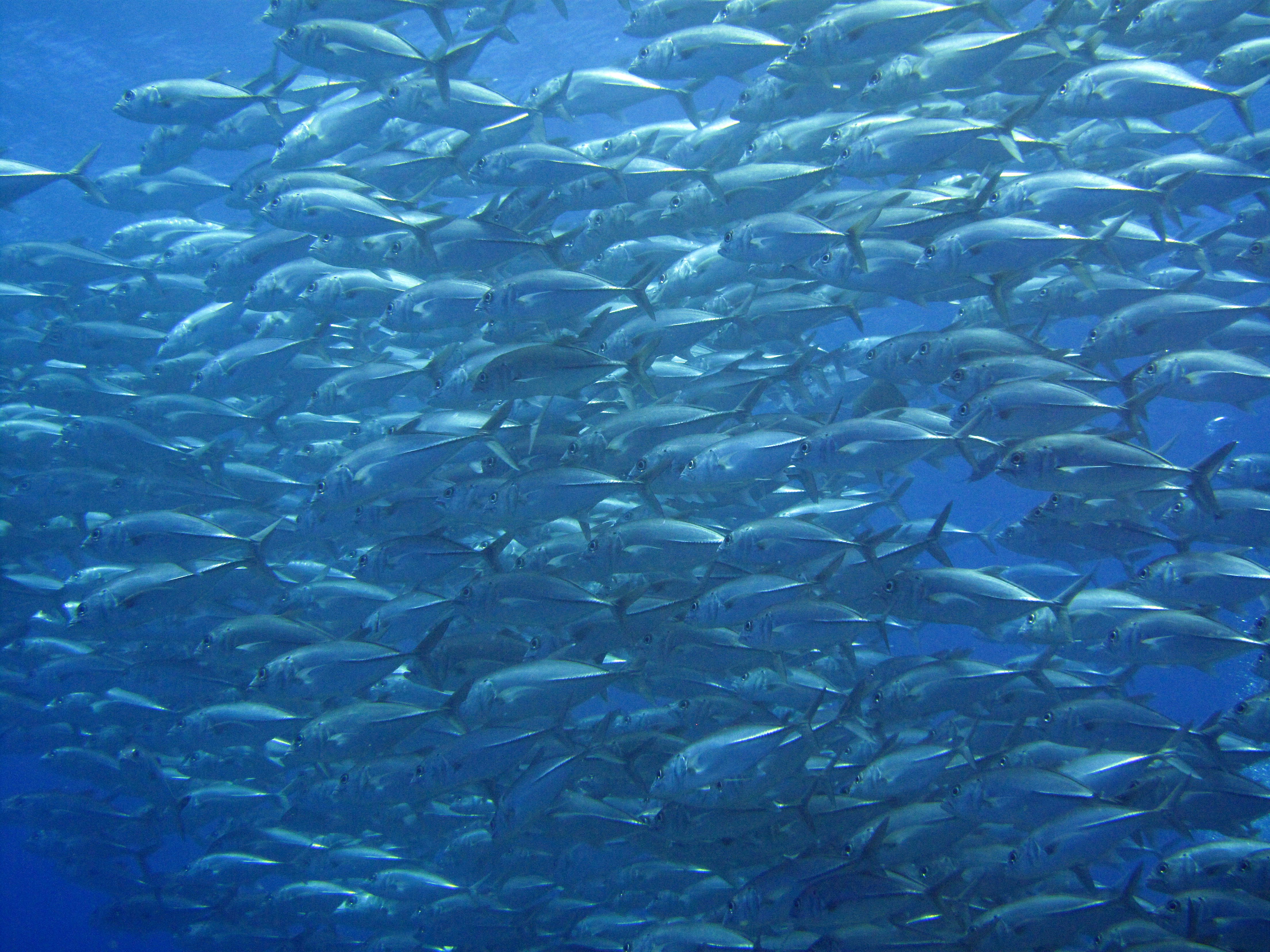
McKean Island, PIPA

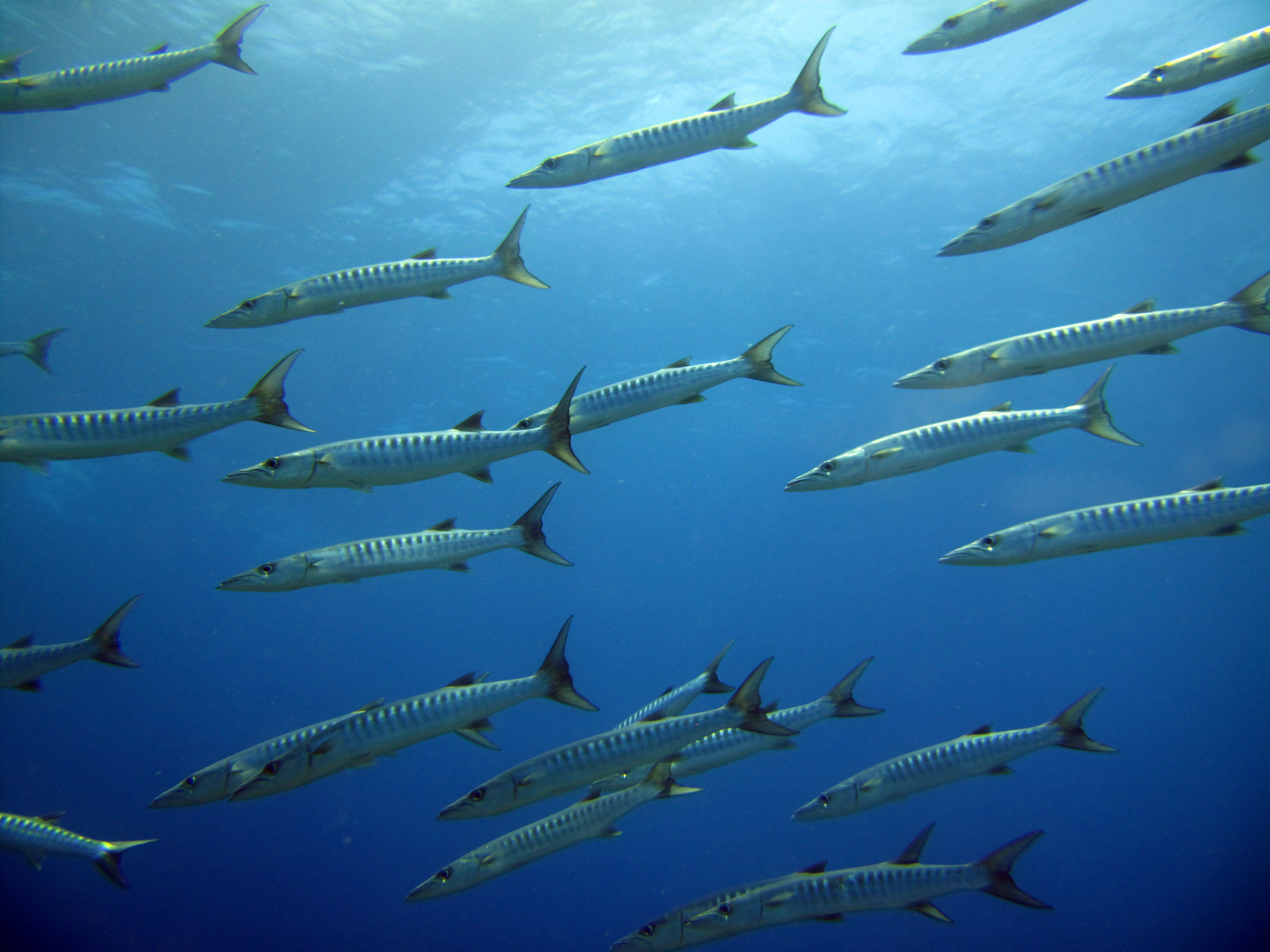
Chevron barracuda

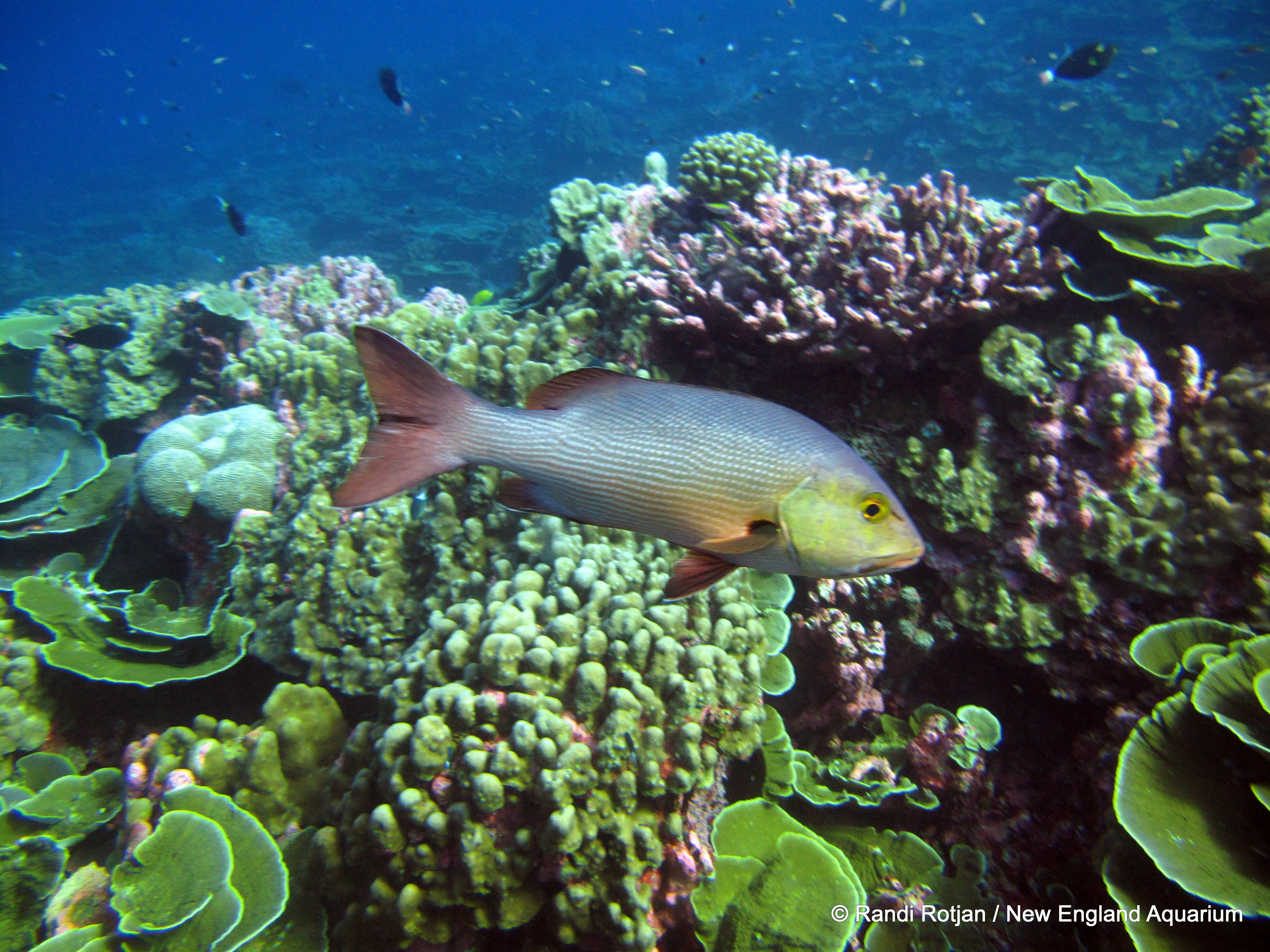
Wildlife in Phoenix Islands Protected Area

== UNESCO World Heritage Site ==
On January 30, 2009, the Republic of Kiribati submitted an application for the Phoenix Islands Protected Area for consideration on the United Nations Educational, Scientific and Cultural Organization (UNESCO) World Heritage List. This was the first nomination submitted by Kiribati since they ratified the Convention in 2000.

On August 1, 2010, at the 34th session of the World Heritage Committee in Brasília, Brazil, the decision was made to inscribe PIPA onto the World Heritage List. It became the largest and deepest World Heritage site in the world.
