= Sydney Packet (1814 ship) =

American ship

History

United States
- Launched: 1801
- Fate: Captured c. 1814

United Kingdom
- Owner: Alexander Birnie & Co.
- Acquired: 1814 by purchase of a prize
- Fate: Wrecked 1826

General characteristics
- Tons burthen: 268, or 269, or 273 (bm)

Sydney Packet (or Sidney Packet) was an American ship launched in 1801, taken in prize c. 1814, while under another name, condemned, and sold to Alexander Birnie & Co. She sailed to New South Wales, and next made three voyages as a whaler. She was lost in 1826.

== Career ==
The ship first appeared in Lloyd's Register (LR) in 1815, as Sydney Packet, and in the Register of Shipping (RS), also in 1815, as Sidney Packet. Both registers gave her master's name as Wilkinson. Lloyd's Register gave her owner's name as Birnie & Co., and her trade as London–Port Jackson. The Register of Shipping gave her owner's name as Bernie, and her trade as London–Botany Bay.

On 11 September 1814, September Sidney Packet, Wilkinson, master, sailed from Deal, bound for the Cape of Good Hope. She sailed via Saint Helena. She visited the Derwent and may have engaged in sealing and whaling. She left there on 12 March 1815. Sydney Packet, Wilkinson, master, arrived at Port Jackson on 15 March, having come from London with merchandise. She left on 8 July, bound for England. On 15 December, Sidney Packet, Wilkinson, master, was at Gravesend, having come from Port Jackson.

On 28 February 1816, Sydney Packet's owners applied to the British East India Company for a licence to sail east of the Cape of Good Hope. They received the licence the same day under the provision for whaling ships.

=== 1st whaling voyage (1816–1818) ===
On 21 March 1816, Sydney Packet, Reece, master, sailed from Deal for the South Seas. On 12 July 1818, Sydney Packet, Rees, master, was at Gravesend, having returned from the South Seas. She returned with 460 casks of whale oil.

=== 2nd whaling voyage (1818–1821) ===
On 13 October 1818, Sydney Packet, Emmett, master, arrived at Deal from the Thames, bound for the South Seas. In August 1820, Sidney Packet "(London Whaler" put into Guayaquil having sustained damage. An earlier report that she had been spoken with was erroneous. Sydney Packet, Hanwell, master, was at Gravesend on 12 May, having returned from Montevideo and the South Seas. returned with 300 casks of whale oil. (On 9 May she had been at Plymouth with Emmett, master.

=== 3rd whaling voyage (1821–1824) ===
Sidney Packet, Emmentt, master, sailed from Gravesend on 28 August 1821, bound for the South Seas. She sailed from Cowes for the South Seas on 21 September 1821. She sailed from St Helena for England on 1 February 1824, and returned to London on 9 April, with 402 casks of oil. In 1823, Emmett may have discovered Birnie Island, which he named after Sidney Packet's owner and also Manra Island, which he named "Sydney".

On her return to London Birnie & Co. sold her to W. Wood, who as master and owner transferred her to Hull.

Year	Master	Owner	Trade	Source and Notes
1824	T.Emmitt; Wood	Birnie & Co.	London–South Seas	LR; good repair 1824
1825	W. Wood	W. Wood	Hull	LR; thorough repair 1824
1825	Hammett	Bernie	London–South Seas	RS; small repairs 1818
1826	W. Wood	W. Wood	Hull–"Straits"	LR; thorough repair 1824

On 29 July 1824, Sidney Packet, Wood, master, was at Archangel. On 15 October, Sydney Packet was at Hull, having returned from Archangel. On 13 December, she was at Deal, having come from Hull on her way to Alexandria. On 15 December, Sidney Packet was at Margate, having come from London and intending to sail to Alexandria. Sydney Packet, Wood, master, arrived at Alexandria on 20 February 1825. She arrived at Milford from Alexandria on 16 September, and at Liverpool, from Milford, on 26 January 1826.

== Fate ==
A report dated "Quebec, 1 June" 1826, reported that Sidney Packet, from Liverpool, had gone onshore at St. Paul Island (Nova Scotia), was gotten off, but had then gone aground at White Island Shoal. A letter dated "Quebec, 6 June" 1826, reported that Sydney Packet, Wood, master, from Liverpool, was on shore at Wood Island, "in a very dangerous situation, and it is feared that she cannot be gotten off." (One source erroneously put the location of her loss off Brazil, conflating her loss in 1826, with that of a different Sydney Packet in November 1816.
