= Rawaki =

Uninhabited atoll of central Kiribati

Native name: Phoenix Island
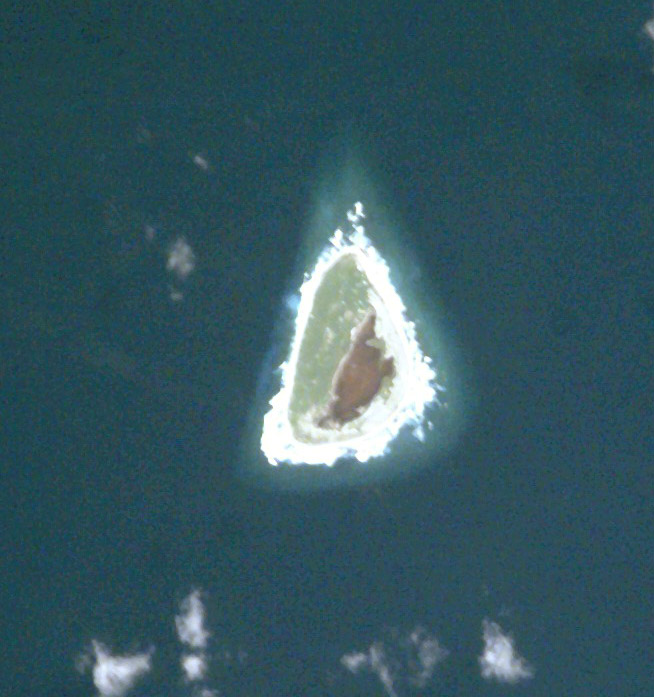
- Rawaki or Phoenix Island. Image Courtesy of Image Science and Analysis Laboratory, Johnson Space Center

Geography
- Archipelago: Phoenix Islands
- Area: 0.65 km^{2} (0.25 sq mi)

Administration
- Kiribati

Demographics
- Population: 0

Rawaki is one of the Phoenix Islands in the Republic of Kiribati, also known by its previous name of Phoenix Island. It is a small, uninhabited atoll, approximately 1.2 by 0.8 kilometres (0.75 by 0.50 miles) in size and 65 hectares (160 acres) in area, with a shallow, brackish lagoon that is not connected to the open sea. It is located at 3.7207°S 170.7124°W.

The island is designated as a wildlife sanctuary. Kiribati declared the Phoenix Islands Protected Area in 2006, with the park being expanded in 2008. The 164,200-square-mile (425,000-square-kilometre) marine reserve contains eight coral atolls including Rawaki island.

== Flora and fauna ==
=== Rawaki's flora and fauna ===
Rawaki has been described as being ham or pear shaped. Its highest elevation is approximately six meters. It is treeless, being covered mostly with herbs and grasses, and thus forms an excellent landing and nesting site for migratory seabirds and turtles. Unlike many other Pacific islands, no rats were noted on Rawaki during a 1924 scientific expedition. A colony of feral rabbits was introduced in the nineteenth century, but was eliminated in 2008.

Rawaki has its own species of seabird tick, Ixodes amersoni. It also boasts various species of flies, moths, leafhoppers, green bugs, and spiders. Sea birds consist of sooty, grey, and white terns; frigates, petrels and shearwaters; boobies, migratory plover and curlew. Rawaki has never been invaded by rats so the bird populations have survived.

=== Rawaki's reefs ===
The 2000 surveys (Obura, et al.) identified that sites on the reef averaged 60% Live Coral Cover with coralline algae as the next dominant cover category in shallow water. Unlike other islands in the Phoenix Group sites, branching corals were not dominant at Rawaki with highest cover contributed by encrusting/submassive colonies or coral plates. Massive corals were also significant in abundance, reflecting the origin of the coral bommies that form the main reef substrate of the sites. The most abundant coral species at Rawaki Island were: Acropora cytherea, Montipora efflorescens, Cyphastrea chalcidicum, Goniastrea stelligera, Leptastrea purpurea, Montastraea annuligera, Pavona varians, Pocillopora grandis, Porites lutea.

== History ==
Unlike some other islands in the Phoenix group, Rawaki does not seem to have ever been inhabited by prehistoric Polynesians or other Pacific islanders.

Rawaki was discovered on 23 February 1824 by Capt. John Palmer from the London whaling ship Phoenix. It was claimed for the U.S. under the Guano Islands Act on March 14, 1859, by C.A. Williams and Company, later the Phoenix Guano Company. The company mined guano on the island until the supply was exhausted in August 1871, when the islands were abandoned. This claim was later relinquished in the Treaty of Tarawa. On June 29, 1889, a British protectorate was declared, and the island surveyed. On March 18, 1937, it was placed under the jurisdiction of the Gilbert and Ellice Islands. It later became part of Kiribati.

In 2008, Rawaki was placed, together with the other Phoenix Islands, within the Phoenix Islands Protected Area, one of the largest marine protected areas in the world.

== See also ==
- List of Guano Island claims
- List of islands
- Desert island
