= List of American Civil War games =

Games based on the American Civil War include board games, miniatures games, and video games. The titles listed below date from 1958 onward.

== List ==
=== Board games ===
- Gettysburg (game) (1958)
- Terrible Swift Sword (1976)
- Battle Cry (Avalon Hill game) (2000)
- A House Divided (board game) (2001)
- Civil War Commander (2010)

=== Miniatures games ===
- The American Uncivil War (2013)
- Enduring Valor: Gettysburg in Miniature (2002)
- Glory, Hallelujah! (2016)
- Hardtack (1971)
- Johnny Reb (1983)
- Ironclad (1973)
- Stars and Bars (1979)

=== Video games ===
- North & South (1989)
- Take Command (2004)
- Forge of Freedom: The American Civil War (2006)
- The History Channel: Civil War - A Nation Divided (2006)
- History Civil War: Secret Missions (2008)
- Darkest of Days (2009)
- Scourge of War (2010)
- Viet-Afghan (2011, Arsenal of Democracy add-on published by FRVP)
- Ultimate General (2014, 2016)
- War of Rights (2014-Ongoing)
- Grand Tactician: The Civil War (1861-1865) (2020-Ongoing)
- Battle Cry of Freedom (2022)
