= Speculation on the disappearance of Amelia Earhart and Fred Noonan =

Theories on 1937 disappearance of American aviators

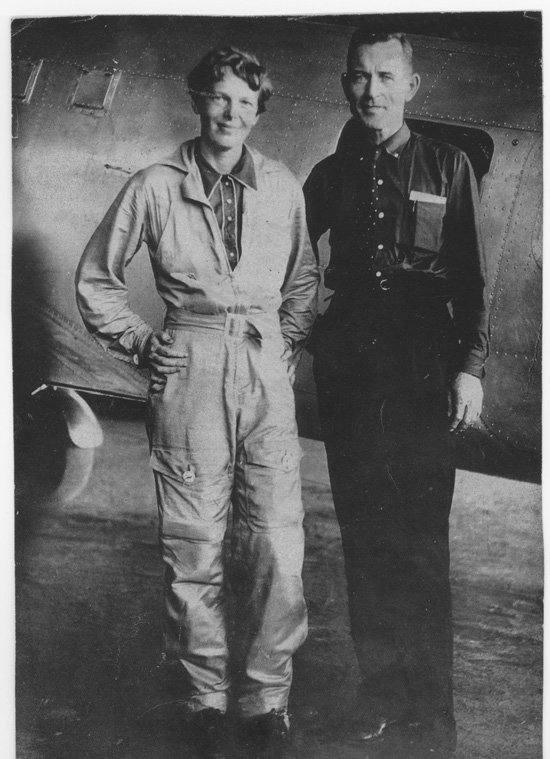
Amelia Earhart and Fred Noonan

Speculation on the disappearance of Amelia Earhart and Fred Noonan has continued since their disappearance in 1937. After the largest search and rescue attempt in history up to that time, the U.S. Navy concluded that Earhart and Noonan ditched at sea after their plane ran out of fuel; this "crash and sink theory" is the most widely accepted explanation. However, several alternative hypotheses have been considered.

Among mainstream historians, fuel-exhaustion-at-sea is viewed as the most likely explanation, with a diversion to Gardner Island also being plausible. Other explanations, such as secret detention by the Japanese, are characterized as conspiracy theories, while others, like alien abduction, are outside the realm of scientific possibility.

== Gardner Island hypothesis ==
The Gardner Island (now called Nikumaroro) hypothesis assumes that Earhart and Noonan, unable to find Howland Island, would not waste time searching for it, instead turning to the south to look for other islands. The 157/337 radio transmission suggests they flew a course of 157° that would take them past Baker Island; if they missed this, then sometime later they would fly over the Phoenix Islands, now part of the Republic of Kiribati, about 350 nautical miles (650 km) south-south east of Howland Island. One of the Phoenix Islands, then known as Gardner Island, has been the subject of inquiry as a possible crash-landing site. The International Group for Historic Aircraft Recovery (Tighar) presented a hypothesis that Earhart and Noonan found Gardner Island, uninhabited at the time, landed the Electra on a flat reef near the November 1929 wreck of freighter SS Norwich City, and sent sporadic radio messages from there.

Among historians, the Gardner island hypothesis is seen as less likely than fuel exhaustion at sea, but still plausible.

=== Background ===
Location of Gardner Island and Howland Island in the Pacific Ocean

Ric Gillespie, author of Finding Amelia, wrote that while listening to alleged radio signals on their home radios, Mabel Larremore heard a woman claiming to be Earhart say Noonan was "seriously injured" and that she had "some injuries but not as serious as Mr. Noonan's." Betty Klenck heard an apparently injured man acting agitated with a distressed woman claiming to be Earhart, and uttering repeatedly what sounded like, "Marie". Noonan's wife's first name was Mary Bea. The man said "Water's knee deep – let me out." Klenck heard the woman say, "George, get the suitcase in my closet ... California." Four years earlier, in a letter to her mother, Earhart had asked that, should anything ever happen to her, the suitcase of private papers stored in her closet in California be destroyed; George P. Putnam was her husband. Klenck heard the woman repeatedly say something that sounded like "New York City", which has been speculated to have been actually Norwich City, the freighter wreck.

A week after Earhart and Noonan disappeared, Navy planes from USS Colorado (which had sailed from Pearl Harbor) searched Gardner Island. The planes saw signs of recent habitation and the wreck of the SS Norwich City, but no aircraft, and repeated circling failed to bring out any signs of survivors seeking rescue. Tighar theorises that the Electra had by then been washed over the reef edge into the ocean where it broke up and sank. Tighar theorises that Earhart, and possibly Noonan, may have tried to survive on the island before perishing as castaways, just before a British exploratory expedition visited Gardner Island in October 1937, just three months after the disappearance. After the Navy ended its search, Earhart's husband undertook a search in the Phoenix Group and other islands, but nothing was found.

=== Objects on the island ===
In October 1937, Eric Bevington and Henry E. Maude visited Gardner with some potential settlers. A group walked all the way around the island, but did not find a plane or other evidence. (Note: During this visit, Bevington took a picture of the SS Norwich City wreck. In 2010, Jeff Glickman, an expert in image processing, claimed that a small portion of a 75-year-old picture showed what looked like landing gear sticking out of the water. A 2019 search of the island suggests that the object in the photo resembles local rocks.) In December 1938, laborers landed on the island and started constructing a settlement. The group took some photos. One photograph was later reviewed and was thought to show an anomalous object which might be a piece of Earhart's aircraft. This became known as the "Bevington object."

In late 1939, USS Bushnell did a survey of the island.

Some observers subscribe to the Tighar theory. Critics accuse Tighar of putting too much importance on circumstantial evidence; for example, an article criticized the suggestion that a jar of freckle ointment found on Nikumaroro might have been Earhart's, when the Electra was "virtually a flying gas station" with little room for amenities as Earhart and Noonan carried extra gas tanks in every scrap of available space, and with the absence of any corroborating evidence connecting the artifact to her.

=== Items found in 1940s ===
Around April 1940, a skull was discovered and buried, but British colonial officer Gerald Gallagher did not learn of it until September. Gallagher did a more thorough search of the discovery area, including looking for artifacts such as rings. The search found more bones, a bottle, a shoe, and a sextant box under a tree on the island's southeast corner.

On September 23, 1940, Gallagher radioed his superiors that he had found a "skeleton ... possibly that of a woman", along with an old-fashioned sextant box (later revealed to have been left during a recent hydrographic survey), (Note: Sir Harry Charles Luke, High Commissioner of the Western Pacific, provided the box to an expert aviation navigator, Harold Gatty. On August 8, 1941, Luke summarized Gatty's conclusions as the box is English, "is of some age" and "does not consider that it could in any circumstance have been a sextant box used in modern trans-Pacific aviation".) The box had two apparent serial numbers on it: 3500 and 1542. In October 2018, documents discovered at the National Archives and Records Administration showed that USS Bushnell had a Brandis and Sons sextant with USNO serial number 1542 in 1938–1939, well after Earhart's disappearance. The USS Bushnell, a U.S. Navy submarine tender that was assigned to hydrographic surveys in December 1937, visited Gardner Island and surveyed the island and its lagoon using sextants around November 1939, before the box was discovered by Gallagher. A Brandis and Sons sextant with serial number 3500 would have been made around the time of World War I.

Gallagher stated that the "Bones look more than four years old to me but there seems to be very slight chance that this may be remains of Amelia Earhart." He was ordered to send the remains to Fiji.

On 4 April 1941, Dr. D. W. Hoodless of the Central Medical School (later named the Fiji School of Medicine) examined the bones, took measurements, and wrote a report. Using Karl Pearson's formulas for stature and the lengths of the femur, tibia, and humerus, Hoodless concluded that the person was about 5 feet 5 1/2 inches (166.4 cm) tall. Hoodless wrote that the skeleton "could be that of a short, stocky, muscular European, or even a half-caste, or person of mixed European descent." Earhart's 1930 pilot's license states she was 5 ft 8 in (173 cm) and 118 lb (54 kg). Hoodless also wrote that "it may be definitely stated that the skeleton is that of a MALE. Owing to the weather-beaten condition of all the bones it is impossible to be dogmatic in regard to the age of the person at the time of death, but I am of the opinion that he was not less than 45 years of age and that probably he was older: say between 45 and 55 years." Earhart was just under 40 years old when she disappeared. Hoodless offered to make more detailed measurements if needed, but suggested that any further examination be done by the Anthropological Department at Sydney University. These bones were apparently misplaced in Fiji and presumed lost.

Around the turn of the 21st century, researchers used Hoodless's measurements to argue against his conclusions that the bones were that of a male. (Note: In 1998, an analysis of the measurement data by forensic anthropologists found instead that the skeleton had belonged to a "tall white female of northern European ancestry". However, a 2015 review of both analyses concluded that "the most robust scientific analysis and conclusions are those of the original British finding indicating that the Nikumaroro bones belonged to a robust, middle-aged man, not Amelia Earhart.") In two 2015 episodes of Expedition Unknown, host Josh Gates searched under a house which had belonged to another doctor from the Fiji School of Medicine, where in 1968 the house's new owner had found a box containing bones including a skull; these were brought to a local museum and lost. Gates combed several bone fragments from the area where the box had been found; these were DNA tested and determined to belong to a male. (Note: A 2018 study by American anthropologist Richard Jantz (one of the authors of the 1998 TIGHAR report) estimated the size of Earhart's skeleton based on photographs and reanalyzed the earlier data using modern forensic techniques. The study concluded that the Nikumaroro bones matched the estimated size of Earhart's bones. However, others criticized the study for being based on little factual evidence (in particular seven measurements from the skeleton done in 1941, combined with estimates about Earhart's size based on photos) and doubted the accuracy of those measurements. The study did not attempt to dispute the original examiner's reinforced, expert conclusions regarding the age of the bones (at least six years older that Earhart's age at the time of her disappearance and possibly older), but acknowledges that Hoodless was qualified to make that assessment. Yet, despite the errors and speculative assumptions of Jantz's research, TIGHAR Executive Director Ric Gillespie appeared on BBC World News shortly after the findings were announced to state, "This is quantification of data. This is real science.") (Note: In 2019, National Geographic conducted an investigation of Earhart's disappearance, which focused on the Gardner Island hypothesis, and was the subject of an October 2019 TV special titled "Expedition Amelia". A study conducted by renowned USF forensic anthropologist Erin Kimmerle revealed that a partial skull discovered in the archives of Tarawa, where Gallagher's administrative office had been located, was likely too small to be Earhart's. Kimmerle sent DNA to be tested against a living Earhart relative. The Science Channel series Conspiracies Decoded aired an episode in January 2021 that featured Kimmerle, the Tarawa bones, and her efforts to identify them. Kimmerle, identified in the episode as Executive Director of the Institute of Forensic Anthropology & Applied Science at the University of South Florida, and an expert in the field of Forensic Anthropology, opined that the skull found in the Tarawa archives is the one measured by Hoodless on Fiji in 1941 based on a comparison of his documented measurements against hers. The Science Channel announced during the broadcast, "DNA that has been recovered clearly shows that they are not the bones of Amelia Earhart." The narrator concludes that the results are a "significant setback" for Earhart-based investigations on Nikumaroro.)

During World War II, US Coast Guard LORAN Unit 92, a radio navigation station built in the summer and fall of 1944, and operational from mid-November 1944 until mid-May 1945, was located on Gardner Island's southeast end. Dozens of Coast Guard personnel were involved in its construction and operation, but were mostly forbidden from leaving the small base or having contact with the Gilbertese colonists then on the island, and found no artifacts known to relate to Earhart.

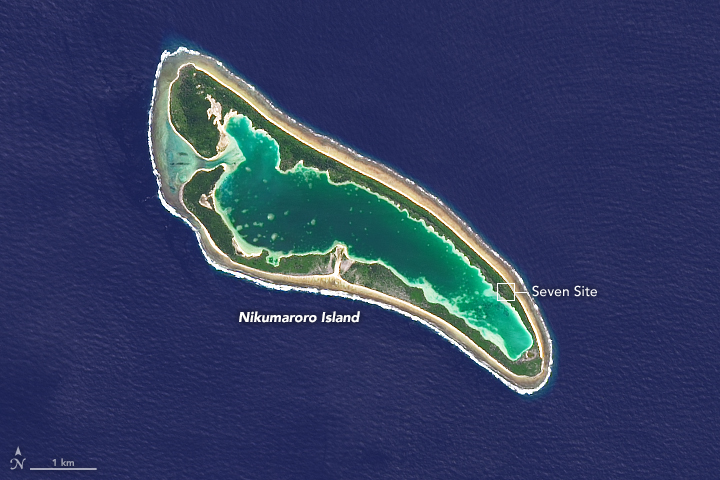
Gardner (Nikumaroro) Island in 2014. "Seven Site" is a focus of the search for Earhart's remains.

=== Explorations 1980s to 2010s ===
In 1988, The International Group for Historic Aircraft Recovery (Tighar) began an investigation and sent 11 research expeditions to Nikumaroro, producing inconclusive results. They have suggested that Earhart and Noonan may have flown without further radio transmissions for two and a half hours along the line of position Earhart noted in her last transmission received at Howland, then found the then-uninhabited Gardner Island, landed the Electra on an extensive reef flat near the wreck of a large freighter (the SS Norwich City) on the northwest side of the atoll, and ultimately perished. Ric Gillespie, the head of TIGHAR went to the island on the group's first expedition in 1989 and again in 1991.

Artifacts discovered by Tighar on Nikumaroro have included improvised tools, an aluminum panel, an oddly cut piece of clear Plexiglas, and a size-9 woman's Cat's Paw shoe heel. (Note: According to records, Noonan was 6 ft (1.8 m) tall and Earhart was 5 ft 8 in (1.73 m) and wore a size 6 shoe according to her sister.) Recently rediscovered photos of Earhart's Electra just before departure in Miami show an aluminum panel over a window on the right side. Ric Gillespie, head of Tighar, claimed that the aluminum panel artifact has the same dimensions and rivet pattern as the one shown in the photo "to a high degree of certainty". Based on this new evidence, Gillespie returned to the atoll in June 2015, but operations using a remotely operated underwater vehicle to investigate a sonar detection of a possible wreckage were hampered by technical problems. Further, a review of sonar data concluded it was most likely a coral ridge. In July 2017, staff from the New England Air Museum notified Tighar that the unique rivet pattern of the aluminum panel precisely matched the top of the wing of a Douglas C-47 Skytrain in the museum inventory, particularly significant since a C-47B crashed on a nearby island during World War II and villagers acknowledged bringing aluminum from that wreck to Gardner Island. In 2012, a cosmetic product was found.

The 2019 National Geographic special Expedition Amelia depicts an August 2019 search for Earhart's aircraft off Nikumaroro's reef conducted by ocean explorer Robert Ballard, who has found several ocean wrecks including the Titanic. Ballard was intrigued by documented radio signal bearings that intersect near Nikumaroro, although they were taken from different locations and at different times. Ballard's expedition had more sophisticated search equipment than Tighar used on its expedition in 2012. He completed his expedition in October 2019. After days of searching the deep cliffs supporting the island and the nearby ocean, Ballard did not find any evidence of the plane or any associated wreckage of it. Allison Fundis, Ballard's chief operating officer of the expedition stated, "We felt like if her plane was there, we would have found it pretty early in the expedition." The documentary states of the Gardner Island hypothesis that "It's a nice story. But like all the other evidence obtained here over the decades, there is no provable link to Amelia or her plane."

=== Possible evidence cited in various sources ===
For decades, there were rumors about the existence of human bones found on the island, with no official statements or confirmation by official sources. In 1997, TIGHAR found the paperwork describing the bones found there. In 1998, TIGHAR received permission to examine the secure records stored in a government archive near London.

In 2020 satellite photos showed an object labeled as The Taraia Object, a large metal object first spotted in a lagoon near the island, and which some claim might be a part of Earhart's plane. In March 2026, a pilot said he believed that Earhart's plane was shown in a photo from Google Maps.

In October 2026, dozens of photos of the island were released by the New Zealand Air Force Museum, which some claimed might show evidence of items that might possibly be artifacts from Earhart's plane.

=== Nikumaroro Island search October 2026 ===
In October 2026, an expedition organized by the Archaeological Legacy Institute (ALI) and Purdue University went to Nikumaroro Island, part of the nation of Kiribati. Their goal was an investigation of the island and the Taraia Object, an object seen underwater in photographs of the island, which some theorized might be Earhart's airplane, a Lockheed Model 10-E Electra. Purdue University had helped with funding for Earhart's flight in 1937, and she had taught there at times.

On October 18, the expedition announced that the object that was thought to be a part of the airplane was found to probably be a clump of trees. The expedition ended without any new findings.

== Theories ==
=== Japanese capture theory ===
Location of Saipan, Marshall Islands, and Howland Island in the Pacific Ocean

Another theory is that Earhart and Noonan were captured by Japanese forces, perhaps after somehow navigating to somewhere within the Japanese South Seas Mandate.

In 1966, CBS correspondent Fred Goerner published a book claiming that Earhart and Noonan were captured and executed when their aircraft crashed on the island of Saipan, part of the Northern Mariana Islands archipelago. (Note: Goerner's book was immediately challenged, but the Time article on it does include a quote from Admiral Chester W. Nimitz, who allegedly told Goerner in March 1965: "I want to tell you Earhart and her navigator did go down in the Marshalls and were picked up by the Japanese.") (Note: Goerner disclosed in his book that Nimitz refused permission to be quoted.) Saipan is more than 2,700 miles (4,300 km) away from Howland Island, however. Later proponents of the Japanese capture hypothesis have generally suggested the Marshall Islands instead, which while still distant from the intended location (approximately 800 miles or 1,300 km), is slightly more possible.

In 1990, the NBC series Unsolved Mysteries broadcast an interview with a Saipanese woman who claimed to have witnessed Earhart and Noonan's execution by Japanese soldiers. No independent confirmation has ever emerged for any of these claims. Various purported photographs of Earhart during her captivity have been identified as either fraudulent or having been taken before her final flight.

A slightly different version of the Japanese capture hypothesis is not that the Japanese captured Earhart, but rather that they shot down her plane. Henri Keyzer-Andre, a former Pan Am pilot, propounded this view in his 1993 book Age of Heroes: Incredible Adventures of a Pan Am Pilot and his Greatest Triumph, Unravelling the Mystery of Amelia Earhart.

Since the end of World War II, a location on Tinian, which is 5 miles (8.0 km) south west of Saipan, had been rumored to be the grave of the two aviators. In 2004, an archaeological dig at the site failed to turn up any bones.

A recent proponent of this theory is Mike Campbell, who published the 2012 book Amelia Earhart: The Truth at Last in its favor. Campbell cites claims from Marshall Islanders to have witnessed a crash, as well as a U.S. Army sergeant who found a suspicious grave site near a former Japanese prison on Saipan.

In 2017, a History Channel documentary called Amelia Earhart: The Lost Evidence, proposed that a photograph in the National Archives of Jaluit Atoll in the Marshall Islands was actually a picture of a captured Earhart and Noonan. The picture showed a Caucasian male on a dock who appeared to look like Noonan and a woman sitting on the dock but facing away from the camera, who was judged to have a physique and haircut resembling Earhart's. The documentary theorizes that the photo was taken after Earhart and Noonan crashed at Mili Atoll. The documentary also said that physical evidence recovered from Mili matches pieces that could have fallen off an Electra during a crash or subsequent overland move to a barge. The Lost Evidence proposed that a Japanese ship seen in the photograph was the Koshu Maru, a Japanese military ship. The Lost Evidence was quickly discredited, however, after Japanese blogger Kota Yamano found the source of the photograph in the archives in the National Diet Library digital collection. The original image was from a Japanese travel guide published in October 1935, implying that the photograph was taken in 1935 or before, and thus must be unrelated to Earhart and Noonan's 1937 disappearance. Additionally, the researcher who discovered the photo also identified the ship in the right of the photo as another ship called Koshu, seized by Allied Japanese forces during World War I, and not the Koshu Maru.

A common criticism of all versions of the Japanese capture hypothesis is that the Japanese-controlled Marshall Islands were a considerable distance from Howland Island. To reach and land there would have required Earhart and Noonan, though low on fuel, to change her north east course as she neared Howland Island and fly hundreds of miles north west, a feat "not supported by the basic rules of geography and navigation." Additionally, had the Japanese found a crashed Earhart and Noonan, they would have had substantial motivation to rescue the famous aviators and be hailed as heroes.

=== Spies for Franklin D. Roosevelt ===
The World War II-era movie Flight for Freedom (1943) is a story of a fictional female aviator (obviously inspired by Earhart) who engages in a spying mission in the Pacific. The movie helped further a myth that Earhart was spying on the Japanese in the Pacific at the request of the Franklin D. Roosevelt administration. (Note: Some authors have speculated that Earhart and Noonan were shot down by Japanese aircraft because she was thought to be spying on Japanese territory so America could supposedly plan an attack.) By 1949, both the United Press and U.S. Army Intelligence had concluded that this rumor was groundless. Jackie Cochran, another pioneering aviator and one of Earhart's friends, made a postwar search of numerous files in Japan and was convinced that the Japanese were not involved in Earhart's disappearance.

=== Tokyo Rose ===
A rumor that claimed that Earhart had made propaganda radio broadcasts as one of the many women compelled to serve as Tokyo Rose was investigated closely by George Putnam. According to several biographies of Earhart, Putnam investigated this rumor personally but after listening to many recordings of numerous Tokyo Roses, he did not recognize her voice among them.

=== New Britain ===
Location of New Britain and Howland Island in the Pacific Ocean

The theory that Earhart may have turned back mid-flight has been posited. She would then have tried to reach the airfield at Rabaul, New Britain (north east of mainland Papua New Guinea), approximately 2,200 miles (3,500 km) from Howland.

In 1990, Donald Angwin, a veteran of the Australian Army's World War II campaign in New Britain, contacted researchers to suggest that a wrecked aircraft he had witnessed in jungle about 40 miles (64 km) south west of Rabaul, on April 17, 1945, may have been Earhart's Electra. Angwin, who had been a corporal in the 11th Battalion at the time, reported that he and other members of a forward patrol on Japanese-occupied New Britain had found a wrecked twin-engined, unpainted all-metal aircraft. The soldiers recorded a rough position on a map, along with serial numbers seen on the wreckage. The map was found in the possession of another veteran in 1993, but subsequent searches of the area indicated failed to find a wreck.

Angwin died in 2001. David Billings, an Australian aircraft engineer, has continued to investigate his theory. Billings claims that the serial numbers written on the map, "600H/P S3HI C/N1055", represent:

- a 600 hp (450 kW) Pratt & Whitney R-1340-S3H1 model engine; and
- "Constructor's Number 1055", an airframe identifier.

These would be consistent with a Lockheed Electra 10E, such as that flown by Earhart, although they do not contain enough information to identify the wreck in question as NR16020.

Pacific Wrecks, a website that documents World War II-era aircraft crash sites, notes that no Electra has been reported lost in or around Papua New Guinea. Ric Gillespie of Tighar believes that based on Earhart's last estimated position, somewhat close to Howland Island, it was impossible for the aircraft to end up at New Britain, 2,000 miles (3,200 km) and over 13 hours' flight time away.

=== Assuming another identity ===
In November 2006, the National Geographic Channel aired episode two of the Undiscovered History series about a claim that Earhart survived the world flight, moved to New Jersey, changed her name, remarried and became Irene Craigmile Bolam. This claim had originally been raised in the book Amelia Earhart Lives (1970) by author Joe Klaas, based on the research of Joseph Gervais. Irene Bolam, who had been a banker in New York during the 1940s, denied being Earhart, filed a lawsuit requesting $1.5 million in damages and submitted a lengthy affidavit in which she rebutted the claims. The book's publisher, McGraw-Hill, withdrew the book from the market shortly after it was released and court records indicate that the company reached an out-of-court settlement with her. Subsequently, Bolam's personal life history was thoroughly documented by researchers, eliminating any possibility that she was Earhart. Kevin Richlin, a professional criminal forensic expert hired by National Geographic, studied photographs of both women and cited many measurable facial differences.

== Views of those close to Earhart ==
A number of Earhart's relatives were reportedly convinced that the Japanese were somehow involved in the disappearance, citing unnamed witnesses including Japanese troops and Saipan natives. One cousin reportedly expressed the belief the Japanese cut the Lockheed Electra into scrap and threw the pieces into the ocean, to explain why the airplane was not found in the Marshall Islands. Earhart's stepson, George Palmer Putnam Jr. rebutted these theories and believed the crash and sink theory, but also expressed support for Tighar's Gardner Island theory. In February 2024, Bram Kleppner expressed his support for the possible finding of the plane on the ocean floor. In November 2024, however, it was confirmed that the object discovered was merely a rock which resembled a plane.
