= Gertrud von Hassel =

Tanzanian-German teacher (1908–1999)

- Oil on plywood self-portrait of Gertrud von Hassel
- Born: 10 September 1908; Dar es Salaam, German East Africa
- Died: 6 September 1999 (aged 90); Meldorf, Holstein, Germany

Gertrud von Hassel was a German teacher and painter from Dar es Salaam in German East Africa, now Tanzania.

== Biography ==
=== Early life ===
Gertrud was the daughter of German officer Theodor von Hassel (1868–1935) and his wife Emma née Jebsen. Theodor was a captain in the Schutztruppe of German East Africa and, after retiring from military service in 1913, owned a coffee plantation in the Usambara Mountains in northeast Tanganyika. Her maternal grandfather was Michael Jebsen, a shipowner and politician.

In 1910, Gertrud became an older sister when her brother Friedrich was born. In 1913, her younger brother Kai-Uwe was born, who would go on to become Prime Minister of Schleswig-Holstein and President of the Bundestag.

Gertrud first attended school at a missionary school in Hohenfriedeberg, where she began drawing. In 1919, the von Hassel family was expelled from German East Africa after the former German colony was handed over to a British mandate by the League of Nations following the conclusion of the First World War. The family moved to Germany and settled in Glücksburg.

=== Education ===
After her family moved to Germany, Gertrud passed her university entrance exams in Flensburg. Between 1928 and 1933, Gertrud von Hassel studied at the University of Fine Arts of Hamburg, the Kunsthochschule Kassel, and Werkkunstschule Dortmund. She sought to become a teacher and completed her training to that end at the Berlin University of the Arts. In 1933, she passed her state examination.

=== Career ===
Starting in 1935, Gertrud worked at schools in Flensburg, Kiel, Rendsburg, and Eckernförde. In 1943, she moved to Meldorf in Holstein, where she worked as an art teacher at the Meldorfer Gelehrtenschule until 1961. One project she undertook while there was a cooperation with Martin Luserke on his Meldorfer style of amateur play, which she worked on between 1947 and 1952.

Through the 1950s, Gertrud visited Mediterranean countries such as Egypt, France, Greece, Italy, Morocco, Spain, and Turkey.

After she retired, she continued to work as a freelance artist. She died in Meldorf, Holstein, on 6 September 1999 at the age of 90.

== Style ==
Gertrud's early work was done in the New Objectivity style. Her work retained concrete realism and an objectively bound depiction. Her late works include portraits with monumental individual figures, still lifes, self-portraits, landscapes, and figure paintings. Over time, her work tended more towards greater abstraction and simplification.

== Bibliography ==
- Roggenbuck, Gunhild. Gertrud von Hassel. Dithmarscher Press Publishing House, Heide 1978, ISBN 3-88089-021-8
- Peters, Anneliese. Meldorfer Character Heads. Books on Demand, Norderstedt. ISBN 978-3-7481-9351-7
- Kilian, Dieter E. Kai-Uwe von Hassel and his family. Between the Baltic Sea and East Africa. Military Biographical Mosaic. Hartmann, Miles-Verlag, Berlin 2013, ISBN 978-3-937885-63-6
