= McKean Island =

Uninhabited island of central Kiribati

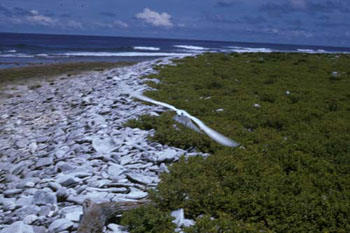
- Coast of McKean Island

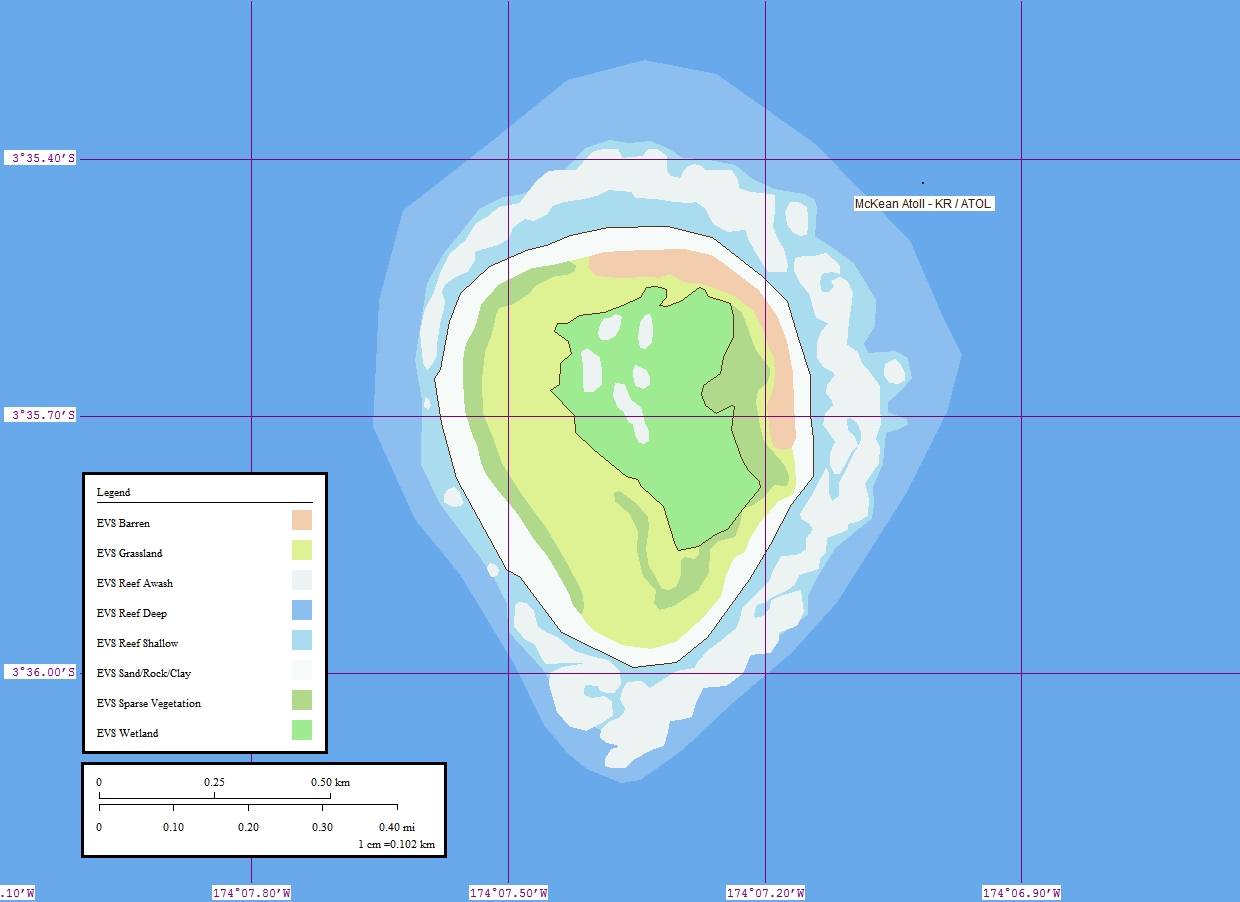
- Map of McKean Island

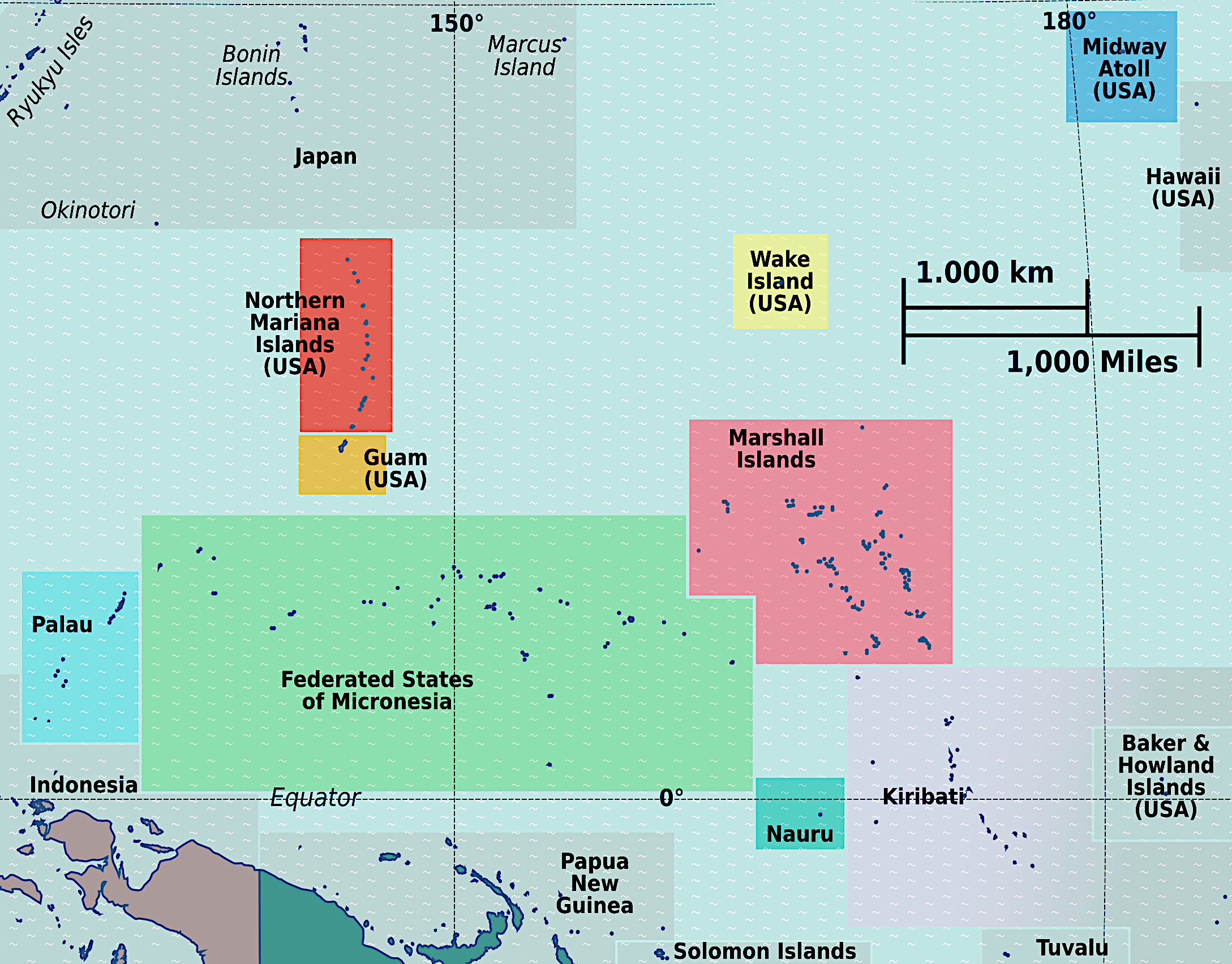
- Location within Kiribati Location within Micronesia Location within Oceania Location within Pacific Ocean

Geography
- Location: Pacific Ocean
- Coordinates: 03°35′45″S 174°07′21″W
- Area: 0.57 km^{2} (0.22 sq mi)
- Kiribati
- Administrative division: Kanton

Demographics
- Population: 0

McKean Island is a small, uninhabited island in the Phoenix Islands, Republic of Kiribati. Its area is 57 hectares (140.85 acres).

Kiribati declared the Phoenix Islands Protected Area in 2006, with the park being expanded in 2008. The 164,200-square-mile (425,300-square-kilometer) marine reserve contains eight coral atolls including McKean Island.

== Flora and fauna ==
=== McKean's flora and fauna ===
McKean is roughly oval in shape, and less than one kilometre in diameter. It is ringed by a reef flat, with a beach ridge of coral rock and rubble surrounding the rim, rising to five metres above sea level. The centre of the island is depressed, with a shallow, hypersaline, guano-laced lagoon. Treeless, McKean harbours seven herbaceous species of plants, and the world's largest nesting population of lesser frigatebird (Fregata ariel) with up to 85,000 birds. 29 other species of birds have been described as visiting the island. Historically, the only mammal was the Polynesian rat, now exterminated, which suggests pre-historic discovery by Polynesians. There is also a species of gecko that inhabits the island.

McKean has no sources of fresh water, and no freshwater lens.

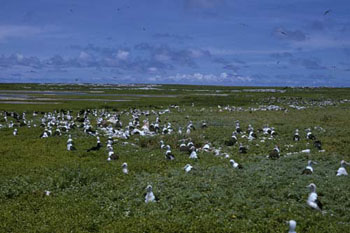
Colony of lesser frigatebirds on McKean Island

=== McKean's reefs ===
Sites on the reef averaged 20% Live Coral Cover, with higher abundance of algae (mainly turf and incipient fleshy algae) as compared to Nikumaroro, coral rubble, and some coralline algae. As at Nikumaroro, branching and encrusting/submassive growth forms predominated, followed by massive corals. Only a small cover of Halimeda was observed while carpeting soft corals (Sinularia and Lobophytum) occupied 10% of the bottom of the lagoon.

== History ==
McKean Island was the first of the Phoenix group to be reported and named. It was discovered May 28, 1794, by the British Capt. Henry Barber, of the ship Arthur, while en route from Botany Bay, New South Wales to the northwest coast of America. Sighting the uninhabited island on 28 May, Captain Barber named it "Drummond's Island", plotting it at 3°40'S, 176°51'W. The Albany Sentinel reported that the "small sandy island...is very low and cannot be seen from the deck of a vessel more than five or six miles". It was later renamed 'Arthur Island' and appeared as such in charts of that time. Its coordinates were given as 3°30'S, 176°0'W.

The island was reported and visited by a number of ships in the years following, including the whaleship Japan in 1830 (under Capt. Shubael Chase), Captain Worth (1832) who mistook it for Onotoa and an unknown whaleship in 1834, who named it "Wigram's Island".

It was renamed McKean Island and mapped by commander Charles Wilkes of the US Exploring Expedition on August 19, 1840, after a member of his crew. However, Arthur Island remained suspected and "in need of confirmation" until at least 1871, when it was listed in Findlay's Directory, using the charts of cartographer John Arrowsmith.

McKean was claimed by the U.S. in March 1859, under the American Guano Act of 1856. C.A. Williams promoted the Phoenix Guano Company of New London, Connecticut, to exploit the deposit of guano. Alfred Restieaux was foreman of the excavation operation in 1867. Guano was actively dug and exported from 1859 to 1870. The island was rarely visited after that time.

McKean was later included in the British Gilbert and Ellice Islands colony. The U.K. resigned its claims on the island when it granted independence to the Republic of Kiribati, and the U.S. resigned its claims to Kiribati in the Treaty of Tarawa.

== Guano from McKean's Island ==
An 1859 article from The Sailor's Magazine reports

"A cargo of 1200 tons of guano, from McKean's Island, was brought into New London by the ship White Swallow on the 30th ult – the first importation from the Phoenix Guano Islands, discovered by C.A. Williams of New London a year ago. These islands lie in 170° west longitude, 3 ½° south latitude, 2000 miles from the Hawaiian group. Mr. Williams took possession of them according to the law of 1856, and has since received a full title from the government.

"The islands are seven in number, and rich in guano deposits. Mr. Williams is a member of the firm of C.A. Williams & Co. Honolulu, and Williams & Haven, New London. The Phoenix Guano Company was organized at New London, to work the guano beds, (which will prove a mine of wealth to the lucky owner) who has thirty or forty men permanently located there. Alfred Goddard is the squatter sovereign "governor" of the territory. When the White Swallow left, the Aspasia of Mystic, and Bowditch of New London were loading at McKean's Island, the only one worked at present."

=== Phoenix guano ===
An 1860 report published by Connecticut State Agricultural Society says

"This name [of the report] is the title of a guano from McKean's Island, situated in the neighborhood of Baker and Jarvis Islands and occupied with a similar deposit. A sample representing the cargo of the White Swallow, imported by the general agents, Messrs. Williams and Haven, into this State, at the port of New London, gave me on analysis 23 ¼ percent of phosphoric acid, equivalent to 50 percent of bone-phosphate of lime, and I have not hesitated to recommend it to our farmers, especially, as I learn that the price will be entirely reasonable, viz: $27.50 per ton, or in quantities over five tons $25 per ton."

== Declaration as a bird sanctuary ==
The island was declared a bird sanctuary in June 1938, and has been a protected area ever since as the McKean Island Wildlife Sanctuary. In addition to natural history expeditions, it was visited in October 1989 by TIGHAR when it was surveyed as a possible landing site of Amelia Earhart.

In 2008, Kiribati proclaimed it to be part of the Phoenix Islands Protected Area, the largest marine protected area in the world. In 2010, the Phoenix Islands Protected Area became the world's largest UNESCO World Heritage Site. In 2002 the fishing trawler Chance wrecked on McKean and released the Asian rats onto the island, which decimated the native populations of storm petrels, blue noddies, and other species of petrels and shearwaters. In 2008 NZAID funded the rat eradication of McKean Island, which in late 2009 was demonstrated to have been successful.

== See also ==
- Desert island
- List of islands

== Sources ==
- Maude, H.E. (1968). Of Islands and Men: Studies in Pacific history. Melbourne, Australia: Oxford University Press.
- Quanchi, Max; Robson, John (2005). Historical Dictionary of the Discovery and Exploration of the Pacific Islands. Scarecrow Press. ISBN 0-8108-5395-7.
- Sharp, Andrew (1960). The Discovery of the Pacific Islands. Oxford, UK: Oxford University Press.
- Bryan, Edwin H. (1941). American Polynesia and the Hawaiian Chain. Honolulu, HI: Tongg Publishing Company. pp. 66–69.
- "McLean Island". Wetlands. United Nations Environment Program. New York, NY: United Nations. Archived from the original on 2007-03-12 – via sea.unep-wcmc.org.
- "TIGHAR" (main page). TIGHAR. Archived from the original on 2010-01-08.
