= Amelia Earhart: The Lost Evidence =

2017 television documentary

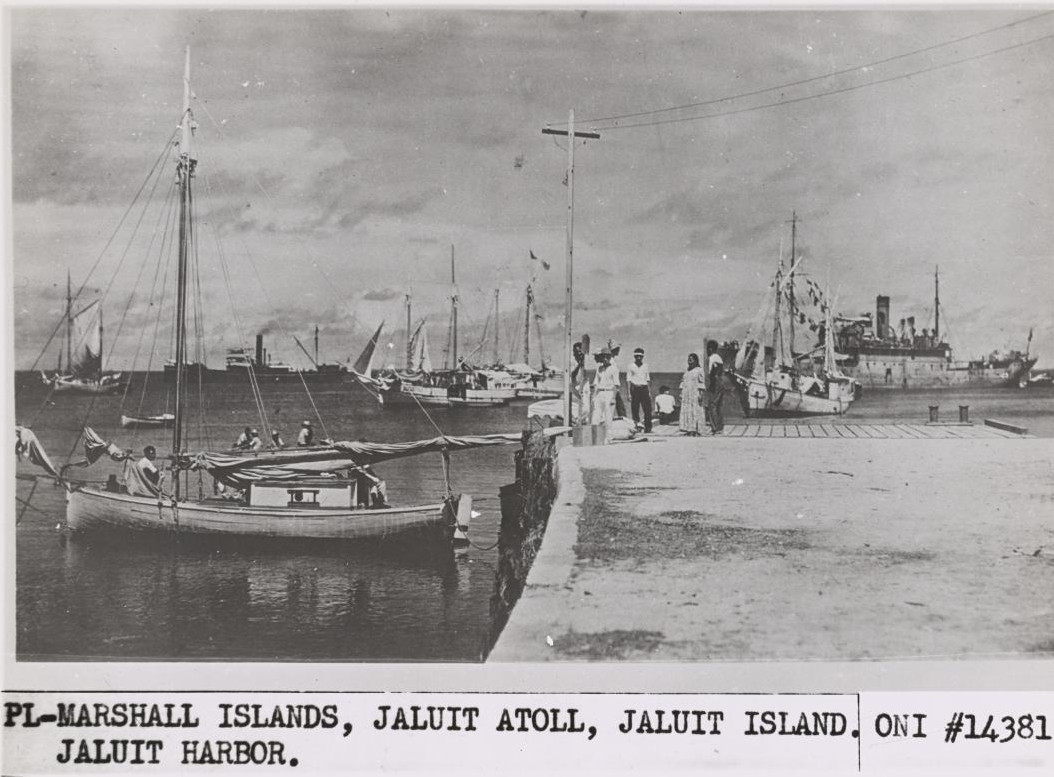
The ONI version of the picture that the documentary used, before the original source was known

Amelia Earhart: The Lost Evidence is a 2017 discredited documentary broadcast by the US television network History that purported to have new evidence supporting the Japanese capture hypothesis of the disappearance of Amelia Earhart and Fred Noonan. Its main piece of evidence, a photograph purportedly showing the two still alive after their 1937 disappearance, was soon proven to have been published in 1935, and subsequent showings of the documentary were cancelled.

== Background ==
In 1937, famous aviator Amelia Earhart and navigator Fred Noonan embarked upon a planned circumnavigation of the Earth via largely equatorial routes. Departing from Miami on June 1, Earhart and Noonan completed multiple legs of their journey without incident. They arrived at Lae, New Guinea on June 29. On July 2, the pair took off on the longest and most dangerous leg of the trip, from Lae to Howland Island, a tiny island in the Central Pacific. They never arrived, and a search effort was unable to locate the pair or their airplane, a Lockheed Electra.

== Historical claims and response ==
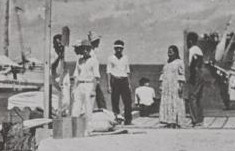
According to The Lost Evidence, the central woman facing the ocean was likely to be Earhart, and one of the men on the left likely Noonan. The actual identities of the subjects of this picture are unknown.

The "lost evidence" in question was a photograph found in the National Archives at College Park of Jaluit Atoll in the South Seas Mandate, the interwar Japanese mandate that included the Marshall Islands. The photograph includes two European-looking people. The documentary, through a forensic analyst who specialized in facial recognition, posited that it was "very likely" to be a picture of a captured Earhart and Noonan. The Lost Evidence also says that a barge in the background might possibly contain a plane, and that plane might possibly have been the Electra. The photograph was from the Office of Naval Intelligence (ONI) and prepared for the 1944 invasion of the Marshall Islands during World War II. The documentary suggested that a ship seen in the background flying a Japanese flag might be the Kōshū Maru, a Japanese military naval vessel that would have been involved in transporting the captives. It suggests that perhaps the Kōshū Maru transported them to Saipan, where they died in custody. The documentary also cited existing evidence for the Japanese capture hypothesis, such as locals who claimed to have witnessed a plane crash at Mili Atoll. It also suggested that the US government might have known about the capture and covered this knowledge up.

Two days after the broadcast of The Lost Evidence, Japanese historian and blogger Kota Yamano investigated the issue and published a blog entry that showed the original source of the photograph that the ONI had used: a travel book The Lifeline of the Sea: My South Sea Memoir (海の生命線 我が南洋の姿, Umi no seimeisen : Waga nannyou no sugata), which was first published in 1935. Earhart and Noonan's final flight was in 1937, so a 1935 photo would be unrelated to Earhart and Noonan's disappearance. In an interview with The Guardian, Yamano criticized the work behind the documentary, saying "I find it strange that the documentary makers didn't confirm the date of the photograph or the publication in which it originally appeared. That's the first thing they should have done." Yamano also said that it only took 30 minutes of searching to find the source. On Twitter, Yamano (as @baron_yamaneko) identified the ship in the right of the photo as a different ship called Kōshū seized by Allied Japanese forces in World War I from the German Empire and not the Kōshū Maru of the Japanese navy.

Skepticism had existed even before Yamano's blog post. The National Archives warned that its version of the photograph did not have a date. Dorothy Cochrane, a curator at the aeronautics department of the National Air and Space Museum, called the new evidence merely a "blurry photograph" and cited the existing evidence from radio transmissions that suggested that the Electra was at least close to Howland Island, 800 miles (1,300 km) away from the Marshall Islands. Author Fukiko Aoki, who researched and wrote a 1982 book, Looking for Amelia, was similarly critical before the revelations from Yamano. Aoki located an elderly officer, part of the 1937 crew of the Kōshū Maru, who denied the ship's involvement. Aoki subsequently researched the Kōshū Maru ship log, which showed that it was 1,500 miles (2,400 km) away at the time of Earhart's disappearance. It was also argued that to reach and somehow land on the remote atoll where she purportedly crashed would have required Earhart, though low on fuel, to change her northeast course as she neared Howland Island and fly hundreds of miles northwest. Additionally, had Japanese officials found Earhart, they would have had substantial motivation to rescue and return her, considering her fame. The claims of a U.S. government cover-up also came under criticism; the documentary prominently mentions "a report dated January 7, 1939 that Earhart was a prisoner in the Marshall Islands." TIGHAR, a group that advocates the Gardner Island hypothesis of the disappearance, investigated the 1939 government report, which was not hard to find, and found that it was a report on an obvious prank – an implausible tale found in France from someone who did not identify themselves. The message told of being kidnapped by the Japanese, having his crew killed, finding Earhart in custody, then being sent to Europe on an unnamed Japanese ship. TIGHAR wrote that the photo was "neither lost nor evidence" and that the picture had been "exactly where it should be, and was exactly what it was labeled to be, a picture of Jaluit Harbor", criticizing the "lost and misfiled photo" element of The Lost Evidence as well.

In response, The History Channel cancelled rebroadcasts of the show, announced it would not be available on streaming or on-demand platforms, and stopped scheduled airings of the show in Canada and the United Kingdom. It wrote in a press release that "HISTORY has a team of investigators exploring the latest developments about Amelia Earhart, and we will be transparent in our findings ... Ultimately, historical accuracy is most important to us and our viewers."

As of December 2017, there has been no further comment from the History Channel.

== Reception ==
Amelia Earhart: The Lost Evidence was broadcast on July 9, 2017, and had 4.3 million viewers, a high number for a History Channel show. Several news reports provided publicity for the documentary as well, saying that the Earhart case had possibly been solved, causing a burst of renewed interest in the case.
