= History Civil War: Secret Missions =

2008 video game

- Xbox 360 cover art
- Developer: Cauldron Ltd
- Publisher: Activision Value
- Composer: Juraj Karkuš
- Engine: CloakNT3 with Havok Physics
- Platforms: Microsoft Windows, PlayStation 2, PlayStation 3, Xbox 360
- Release: NA: November 4, 2008
- Genre: First-person shooter
- Mode: Single-player

History Civil War: Secret Missions is a historical first-person shooter video game developed by Cauldron Ltd and released on November 4, 2008 by Activision Value and the History Channel for Microsoft Windows, PlayStation 2, PlayStation 3 and Xbox 360. It is a sequel to The History Channel: Civil War – A Nation Divided.

== Overview ==
The player assumes the role of both Union and Confederate soldiers fighting behind enemy lines in legendary battles that took place during the American Civil War.

The player's goal is to disrupt the armies of both the North and South by any means necessary, including stopping enemy supply lines, stealing ironclad ships and sabotaging enemy strongholds. Engaging in some of the Civil War's most famous battles, such as The Great Train Raid of 1861 and the fall of Vicksburg in utilizing classic weapons of the era, including the pepperbox revolver and the coffee mill gun.

All missions are based on the actions of famous partisans, scouts and rangers – fighting as a member of Mosby's Rangers, Sheridan's Scouts and Grant's Secret Service and receiving mission commands from famous generals like Robert E. Lee, "Stonewall" Jackson, and Ulysses S. Grant.

== Gameplay ==
This game takes the player through secret missions that took place on both sides of the war. The player has to battle enemy forces and protect his fellow soldiers. Melee is a large part of the game, as it was in the prequel. Reload times vary from weapon to weapon, with muskets taking a long time to reload, and repeating rifles taking a relatively short time.

Missions include being a part of a secret sniper mission at the Battle of Gettysburg, conducting a covert train raid on the B&O Railroad, sabotage artillery outposts during the Battle of Lewisburg, etc. Players get to use a variety of weaponry from the era – such as repeating rifles, grenades, sabers, artillery, and shotguns.

The game features intense, tactical combat. It is based on authentic Civil War combat methods, artillery barrages, urban assaults, sniping, and stealth. Set charges, place explosives, sabotage enemy strongholds, and destroy enemy buildings to complete objectives.

Each level begins with a short History Chanel documentary video, which describes the historical events depicted and their significance in the Civil War. Players encounter bonus objectives from mission to mission such as saving P.O.W.s and destroying crates. Players can ignore or accept these bonus objectives.

== Development ==
Activision Publishing staff Dave Oxford announced the game during a convention at Santa Monica, California on August 2008, stating, "There is a rich history to the Civil War, especially in terms of covert military tactics" and that "American warfare in the 1860's was brutal yet surprisingly sophisticated, so it was essential for us to capture this duality." A short story entitled "The Partisans", which detailed the background of one of the protagonists of the game named Edward Hogger, was bundled and released with Xbox 360 copies of the game. The story was written by writer Mark Danilo.

== Reception ==
Reception

Aggregate scores
Aggregator	Score
GameRankings	50.50% (6 reviews)
Metacritic	51% (6 reviews)

Review scores
Publication	Score
GameSpot	5.0 of 10
GameTrailers	8.0/10
GameZone	5.5/10
IGN	5.5 of 10
Official Xbox Magazine (UK)	5.5/10
X-Play	3/5

The game received mixed reviews from critics, with most of the praise coming from its unique Civil War setting. IGN praised the graphics but panned the length of the game. GameRankings criticizes the small glitches, but praised the game in portraying "something to skip WWII shooters".

Many critics did, however, commented the game as one of the best of its genre, noting how special it was due to its unique setting. Daniel Martinez from The Gamer listed it at #5 in his "10 Games Based On The American Civil War", praising its accuracy of the time period and its uniqueness.

Video game researchers David A. Clearwater and John A. Bargamento considered it an influential title in first-person shooters, citing the game as an inspiration behind the post-2010 influx of unique historical shooters that take place in other time periods besides World War II. These include games such as Darkest of Days, Call of Duty: Black Ops, Betrayer, Verdun, and another Civil War game entitled War of Rights.
