= Kōshū =

Kōshū or Koshu may refer to:

- Kōshū (甲州)
  - Kōshū, another name for Kai Province.
  - Kōshū, Yamanashi, the present city in Yamanashi Prefecture.
  - Koshu (grape), a variety of Grape. / 甲州 (葡萄)
- Kōshū (向州)
  - Kōshū, another name for Hyūga Province.
- Kōshū (膠州)
  - Kōshū (survey ship), a ship of the Imperial Japanese Navy
