= Friedrich von Hassel =

- Born: Friedrich Julius Hassel; 11 October 1833; Hamm, Rhine Province, Prussia
- Died: 14 October 1890 (aged 57); Hamm, Rhine Province, Germany
- Spouse(s): Elise Helene Christiane Thormann/Hassel (1846–1896)
- Children: 3
- Military career
- Allegiance: Prussia; German Empire
- Branch: Prussian Army; Imperial German Army
- Service years: 1853–1890
- Rank: Generalleutnant
- Commands: 6th Division
- Conflicts: Second Schleswig War; Austro-Prussian War; Franco-Prussian War
- Awards: Order of the Red Eagle

Friedrich Julius von Hassel (11 October 1833 – 14 October 1890) was a Lieutenant general in the Prussian army. He spent most of his life as Friedrich Julius Hassel, but was raised to the Nobility by the emperor in 1887. His grandson, Kai-Uwe von Hassel, served as the West German Minister of Defence between 1963 and 1966.

== Provenance ==
Friedrich Julius Hassel was born in Hamm, a flourishing town in the western part of Prussia, with strong mining and manufacturing sectors. Friedrich Julius was the son of the lawyer Heinrich Wilhelm Hassel and his wife, Marianne Friederike (born Marianne Friederike von Rappard). Heinrich Wilhelm Hassel was a senior legal official (Geheimer Justizrat) at the Hamm District Court.

== Military career ==
Hassel attended the Secondary school in Hamm ("Gymnasium Hammonense"), passing his school final exams in 1853. In October of that same year he joined the Second Battalion of the 15th (2nd Westphalian) Infantry "Prince Frederick of the Netherlands" of the Prussian army as a musketeer. The battalion was based at this time at Wesel, a garrison town near the western edge of Prussia's Rhine Province. In 1855 he was promoted to the rank of Lieutenant. A few years later, reflecting a favourable performance evaluation, he was given command of the Prussian Military Academy between 1858 and 1861. Further commands took him successively to Halberstadt and Erfurt following which he was promoted to the rank of Oberleutnant and transferred to the Fusilier Battalion of the 15th Infantry Regiment in Bielefeld in the middle of January 1863. The regiment took part in the Second Schleswig War against Denmark in 1864, during which Hassel distinguished himself on 17 April 1864: together with a Captain von Hoffmüller he managed to get his unit across the Alssund, render Danish canon on the Island of Als inoperable, and return with equipment and munitions undamaged. The next day he was decorated for this exploit with the Order of the Red Eagle (with military swords). The heroic deed was later recalled by the inclusion of the image of a boat when the family received a coat of arms in 1887.

In the Austro-Prussian War Hassel took part, as a member of the Elbe Army in the Battles of Hühnerwasser and the Münchengrätz. On 28 July 1866 he became a Captain and was decorated with the Order of the Crown. In March 1870, now a Company commander, Hasel was transferred again, this time to the 35th Brandenburg Fusilier regiment. With the mobilisation that year against France, he joined the General Staff of the 16th Division. In this position he participated in the Battles of Spicheren, Mars-la-Tour, Gravelotte, Amiens, Hallue and St. Quentin. He also took part in the successful Siege of Metz. Hassel was promoted again on 22 December 1870, now becoming a Major, and awarded the Iron Cross. After the war was formally concluded by the Treaty of Frankfurt (1871), he was transferred to the General Staff of the 8th Army Corps.

In February 1877, now an Oberstleutnant, he was sent to Königsberg as a representative of the Chief of the General Staff of the 1st Army Corps. However, serious illness forced his removal from the General Staff in October 1878. On his recovery he was given an à la suite General Staff appointment and given a teaching post at the Military Academy. In 1881 Hassel was made Chief of Department 1 of the Army General Staff and promoted to the rank of colonel. His department focused on strategic intelligence regarding the Russian army.

He returned to field service on 23 September 1883 as commander of the Magdeburg 36th "Count Blumenthal" Regiment, and was then on 25 April 1885 ordered to represent the Chief of the General Staff of the 4th Army Corps. On 24 June 1885, now with the rank and remuneration of a Brigade Commander, Friedrich Hassel was appointed Chief of this General Staff, and on 4 December 1885 he became a Major general.

On 22 March 1887 Friedrich Hassel was ennobled by the emperor, in recognition of his long service. One result was that his family name changed from "Hassel" to "von Hassel". Between 16 May 1888 and 21 March 1889 he commanded the 15th Infantry Brigade, based in Erfurt. After that, promoted again, now to the rank of Lieutenant General, he was given command of the 6th Division, based in Brandenburg an der Havel. However, he was pensioned out of the army, with the usual ceremony, on 12 August 1890 due to illness. Two months later he died at a sanatorium in the Harz mountain region.

== Personal ==
Friedrich Hassel married Elise Helene Christiane Thormann (1846–1896) on 11 November 1866 at Rendsburg. The marriage produced three recorded children as follows:

- Theodor Emil Ferdinand von Hassel (27 July 1867 - 10 March 1915), a career soldier who was killed in action in the Battle of Neuve Chapelle
- Theodor von Hassel (29 September 1868 - 29 November 1935), a career soldier and the father of Kai-Uwe von Hassel (1913-1997)
- Magdalene von Hassel (5 June 1872 - 30 October 1942) who married Franz Adolf von Gordon
