= Henry Barber (sea captain) =

British sea captain

- Occupation: Sea captain

Henry Barber was an 18th-century British sea captain, credited with the discovery of McKean Island, in the Phoenix group in the Pacific Ocean.

== Sailing history ==
Barber operated merchant routes from India and America to the new settlement at Port Jackson.

Barber was responsible for the first recorded western shipwreck in the Hawaiian Islands. On 31 October 1796, the British brig Arthur, commanded by Captain Henry Barber, struck a coral shoal off what is now called Barbers Point, O‘ahu, and was driven onto the rocks. Six of the twenty-two men aboard were swept to their deaths while struggling to get a boat off.

== Discovery of McKean Island ==
Captain Barber made four voyages to the Pacific North West between 1794 and 1804. While captaining the British ship Arthur on a journey from Botany Bay, New South Wales to the north-west coast of America in 1794, Barber discovered what is believed to be McKean Island. Sighting the uninhabited island on 28 May, Barber named it "Drummond's Island", plotting it at 3°40'S, 176°51'W. The Albany Sentinel reported that the "small sandy island...is very low and cannot be seen from the deck of a vessel more than five or six miles". It was later named 'Arthur Island' and appeared as such in Arrowsmith's charts of the time located at 3°30'S, 176°0'W. The closest island to these coordinates is McKean Island at 3°35'S, 174°02'W, which was renamed and mapped by Charles Wilkes of the United States Exploring Expedition 1838–1842. However, Arthur Island remained suspected and 'in need of confirmation' until at least 1871, when it was listed in Findlay's Directory, using the charts of cartographer John Arrowsmith.

== The Battle of Sitka ==
Henry Barber was responsible for the saving of 3 Russians, 20 other native allies, and many of the pelts that were taken by the Tlingit Warriors that had attacked the Russian fort. Barber took the survivors, supplies, and news of the attack to Kodiak, Alaska where he had asked for 50,000 rubles as an award. Instead, Barber had received 10,000 rubles just 20% of what he had originally asked for.
