= Theodor von Hassel =

German officer (1868–1935)

- Born: Theodor Berthold Paul Hassel; 29 September 1868; Trier, Rhine Province, Prussia
- Died: 29 November 1935 (aged 67); Mahenge, Tanganyika
- Occupations: Army Officer (Germany & German East Africa)
- Spouse: Emma Jebsen (1885–1960)
- Children: Gertrud von Hassel (1908–1999); Friedrich von Hassel (1910–); Kai-Uwe von Hassel (1913–1997); Michael von Hassel (1915–)
- Parent(s): Friedrich von Hassel (1833–1890); Elise Helene Christiane Hassel (born Thormann) (1846–1896)

Theodor von Hassel (29 September 1868 – 29 November 1935) was a German officer and a farmer in East Africa. He was also noted as an enthusiastic hunter of elephants.

His son, Kai-Uwe von Hassel, served as president of the West German Bundestag.

== Life ==
=== Family provenance and early years ===
Theodor Berthold Paul Hassel was the second son of Prussian Army officer Friedrich von Hassel (1833–1890) and Elise Helene Christiane Hassel (born Thormann) (1846–1896). His father's military career meant a childhood disrupted by frequent relocation. On 22 March 1887 Friedrich Hassel was ennobled by the emperor, in recognition of his long military service. One result was that his family name changed from "Hassel" to "von Hassel".

In 1878 Theodor was accepted into the Prussian Academy for Officers' sons in Groß-Lichterfelde, just outside Berlin. In 1885 he switched to Cathedral School in Magdeburg, passing his School final exams (Abitur) in 1887. That same year he joined the Prussian army as an officer, serving in the Queen's Fusilier Regiment (Schleswig-Holstein) No.86, under the command of von Kusserow. The third battalion of the regiment was stationed in Sønderborg Castle in the area where two and a half decades earlier his father had served with distinction during the Franco-Prussian War. During this period Theodor won a medal for jumping into the water in the harbour at Copenhagen and rescuing a child who had fallen in. For a time he served as a sailing instructor with the Sonderburg Sea battalion before returning, in 1900, to his earlier duties.

=== Africa ===
In 1903 von Hassel enrolled as an Oberleutnant in the Protection Force for German East Africa, thereby resigning from the German Imperial Army. On reporting in Dar es Salaam in May 1903 he was promoted to the rank of "Hauptmann", a junior officer rank, though initially as a supernumerary officer without a posting. There followed a period of instruction covering the relevant legal framework applicable to the Protection Force and basic familiarisation with Swahili. At the end of August 1903 he became a commando with the Third Company based along the coast to the south in Lindi. In November 1904 he took over command of the Twelfth Company in Mahenge, an inland location in the southern part of the German East Africa colony. Mahenge was in the heart of the region affected by the Maji Maji Rebellion. At the end of August 1905 several thousand rebel warriors arrived at the garrison. The ensuing battle took the form of a siege in which von Hassel, his group of sixty native soldiers, a few hundred loyal tribesmen massively outnumbered, authorised the use of the defenders' two machine guns. The attackers were fought off only with difficulty: many were killed.

During a lengthy period of home leave back in Germany, von Hassel met Emma Jebsen at a ball in Apenrade and married her in October 1906. His bride was the youngest daughter of the shipowner-politician Michael Jebsen. (At that time, and indeed until 1920, Apenrade was in Germany.) On 10 January 1907 they arrived together back in Dar es Salaam. Kurt von Schleinitz, appointed commander of the East African Protection Force in May 1907, awarded von Hassel with the prestigious Order of the Red Eagle in recognition of his contribution to the suppression of the Maji Maji Rebellion. Von Hassel was now given command of the Fifth Company, based in Masoko near Neu-Langenburg, still in the inland southwestern part of the German colony.

The couples' first child, Gertrud, was born in Dar es Salaam on 10 May 1908. Gertrud later became an artist. It was partly in order to avoid Malaria that Emma von Hassel spent most of her second pregnancy staying with her parents in Apenrade, where their first son, Friedrich, was born on 16 April 1910. By this time von Hassel had already left the Protection Force in 1909, setting himself up as a farmer in German East Africa. He set up what he called the "New Apenrade Farm" ("Farm Neu-Apenrade") in the Wilhelmstal (valley) in the Usambara Mountains, close to the frontier with what later became Kenya and a couple of hundred miles to the north of Dar es Salaam. Coffee was the main crop. It was near the coffee farm, at the missionary station at Gare, that their second son Kai-Uwe was born on 21 April 1913.

In August 1914 the outbreak of the First World War heralded von Hassel's return to the Protection Force, now facing a large hostile British army. Communications with Germany were broken and the small force of German settlers was ultimately overwhelmed. Theodor von Hassel was taken prisoner by the British in November 1917, and the end of the war a year later found his wife and children abandoned in a colony which was being expropriated by the British. At the start of 1919 the British ordered the remaining German colonists to leave and the family was split up. At least one of the children, Kai-Uwe, was deposited by a merchant ship at Rotterdam in February 1919, and then looked after by relatives, but the children's mother was not able to return to Germany till 1920. Theodor von Hassel was removed first to Egypt and then to Malta. In 1919 he was released into Germany. Apenrade was transferred to Denmark in 1920 following a plebiscite in which the wish of the urban majority to remain in Germany was outweighed by votes from the surrounding countryside. Theodore and his wife attempted to start a new life together in nearby Glücksburg, which had now become the most northerly town in Germany, while the children lived for at least some of this period with relatives. In 1926, the marriage having failed, Theodore returned without his family to East Africa. The region where they had previously lived had been handed over to the British and renamed Tanganyika. Von Hasel sought to create a new coffee plantation not on the site of his former farm in the north of the country, which had been expropriated, but near Mahenge where he had served during the early years of the century. During the final months of his life he was joined in the enterprise by his son, Kai-Uwe von Hassel, who had trained for a career as an Agribusiness merchant during the preceding two years. However, on 29 November 1935 Theodor von Hassel died, from cerebral malaria. His body was buried at Mahenge's military cemetery.
