= Golden Fleece (clipper) =

1855 California clipper

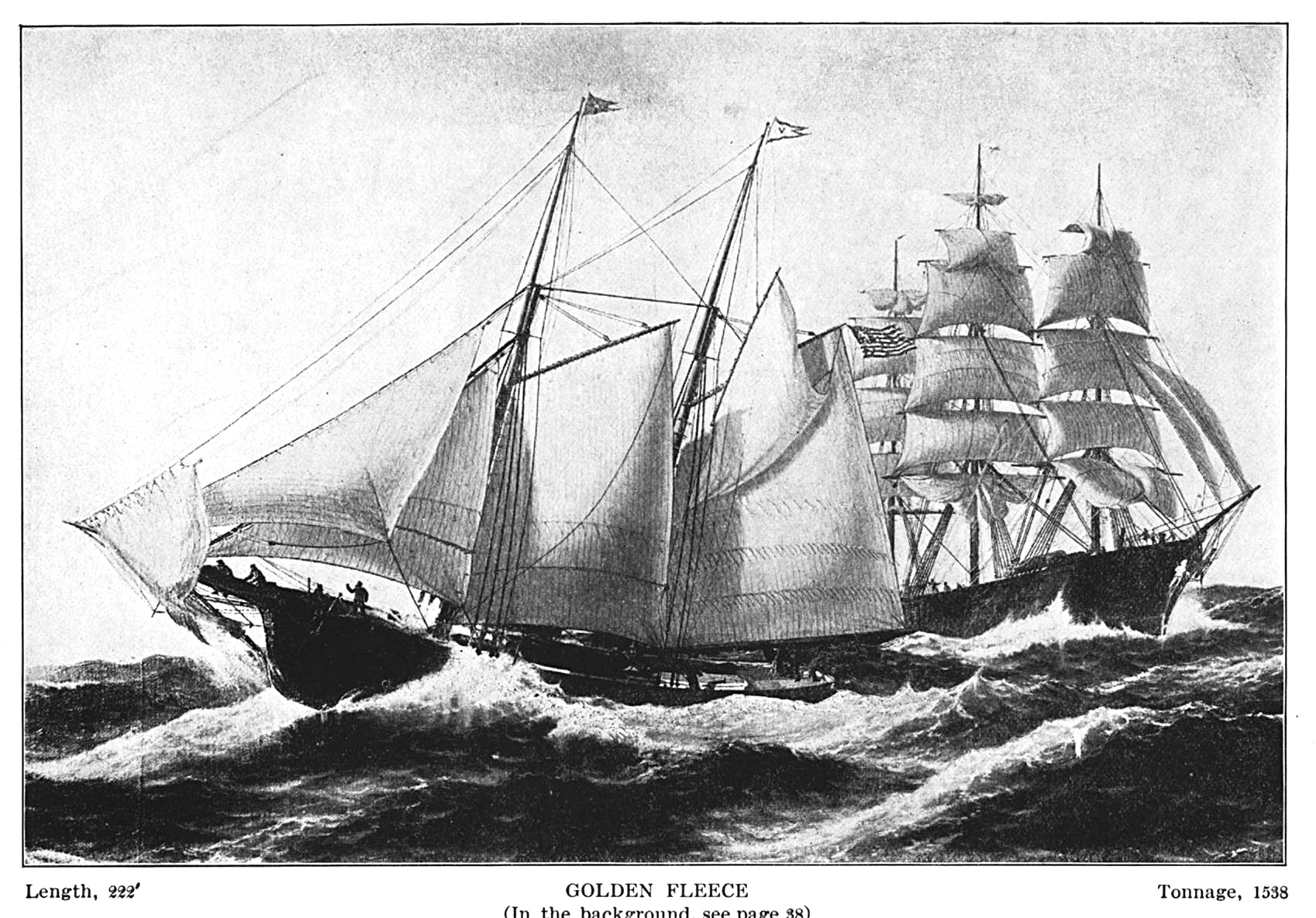
- Golden Fleece passing from behind an unidentified ship

History

United States
- Owner: W.F. Weld & Co.
- Builder: Paul Curtis, East Boston
- Launched: Nov. 20, 1855
- Acquired: 1872, Thayer & Lincoln, Boston
- Fate: Ran aground 22 February 1877; declared constructive total loss

General characteristics
- Tons burthen: 1535 tons OM, 1475 tons NM
- Length: 222 ft (68 m) LOA
- Beam: 37 ft 9 in (11.51 m)
- Draft: 25 ft (7.6 m)

Golden Fleece was an 1855 medium clipper in the California trade, built by Paul Curtis. She was known for arriving with cargoes in good condition, for making passages in consistently good time, and for catching fire with a load of ice.

== Construction and namesake ==
Golden Fleece was built from the same model as the clipper Reporter. She had a knight in armor as her figurehead.

This was the second clipper named Golden Fleece built by Paul Curtis, for the same owners. The first Golden Fleece sailed from 1852 to 1854.

== Voyages to San Francisco ==
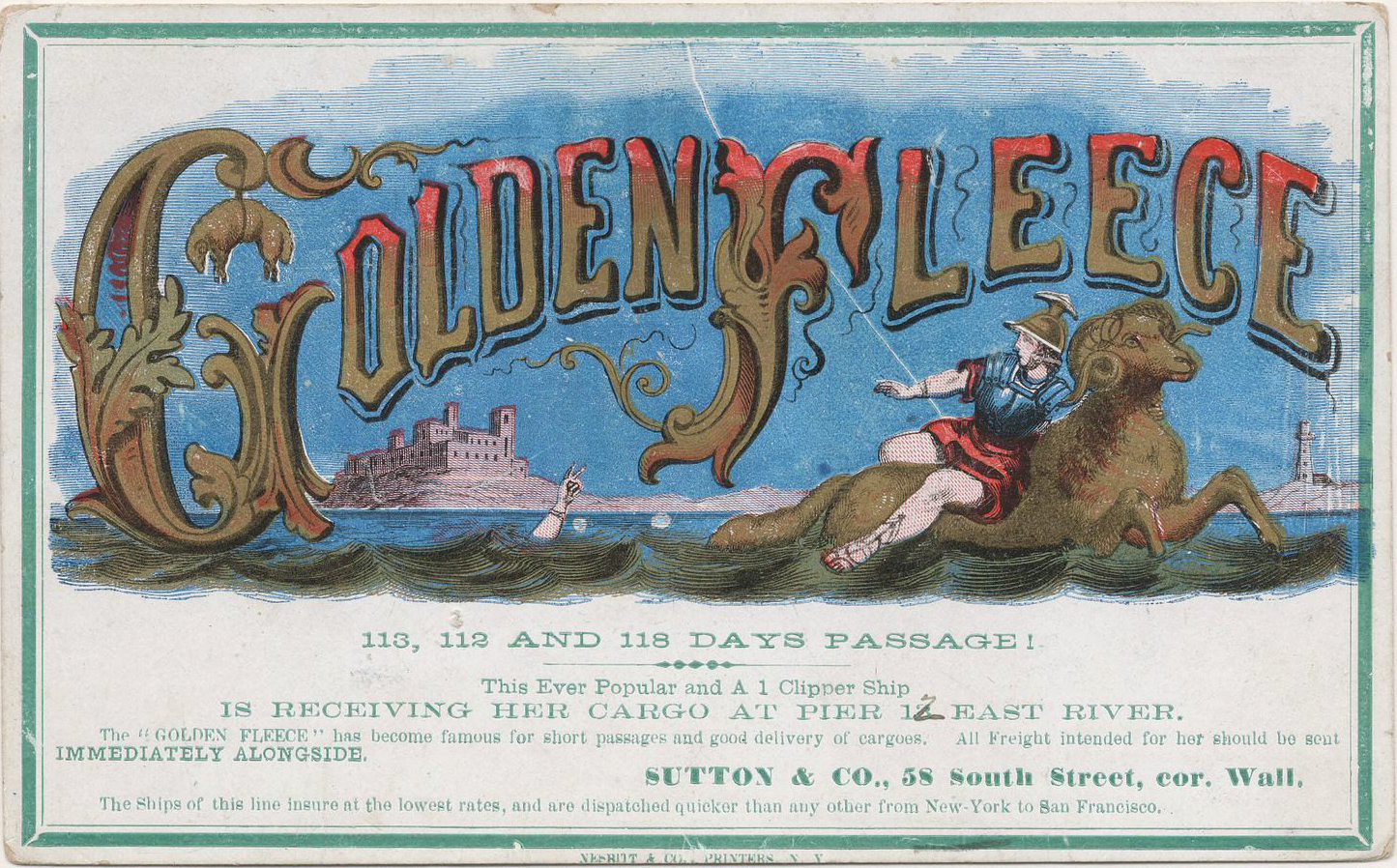
Sailing card

Golden Fleece made 3 passages from Boston to San Francisco, with an average time of 117 days.

She made 12 passages from New York to San Francisco, with an average time of 125 days.

Other ports of call included Manila, Cebu, Honolulu, Yokohama, Callao, Liverpool, and Queenstown.

== Race with White Swallow ==
In 1868, Golden Fleece made a 44-day passage from San Francisco to Hong Kong, arriving three days before White Swallow, a clipper known for her speed. White Swallow had left the Golden Gate with a two-day head start.

== Race with Golden State ==
In 1860, the two clippers Golden State and Golden Fleece left New York on the same day. Despite taking different routes in the Atlantic section of their voyages, the two ships arrived in San Francisco a few hours apart, on Oct. 29th, after passages of 128 days.

== Mishap outside the Golden Gate ==
Golden Fleece sustained relatively little damage for a ship with so many voyages around Cape Horn. Nevertheless, she had several mishaps.

In 1857, on her second voyage, as Golden Fleece was entering the Golden Gate, she struck Four Fathom Bar off Point Bonita, better known as the "Potato Patch". Golden Fleece was run up on the mud flats, and made it to the wharf with 12–14 feet of water in the hold.

In 1873, Golden Fleece lost all her sails, and much of her rigging on an outbound voyage from New York. She put in for repairs in Rio de Janeiro.

== Caught fire with a load of ice ==
Golden Fleece made only one voyage from the East Coast with a destination other than San Francisco, in 1871.

She left New York bound for Bombay with a load of ice on July 1, 1871, under Captain Bray. Three days out, a fire was spotted at the bottom of the forward hold, in the sawdust and shavings used to pack the 1902 tons of ice. Since it was not possible to extinguish the fire, Golden Fleece put in at Halifax, the nearest port, two days later.

Golden Fleece was scuttled at Tobin's Wharf, Halifax. The 20 feet (6.1 m) of water in her hold was then pumped out with a steam fire engine. After the ship was pumped out, fire broke out a second time, but was extinguished by spraying water into the hold. The cause of the fire was thought to be stevedores smoking while loading the cargo of ice.

== Loss of the ship ==
On February 22, 1877, she went aground at the mouth of the Rio de la Plata off Uruguay. After being surveyed at Montevideo, she was condemned and sold. Her cargo was sent on aboard the clipper Granite State.
