= White Swallow =

Extreme clipper (ship)

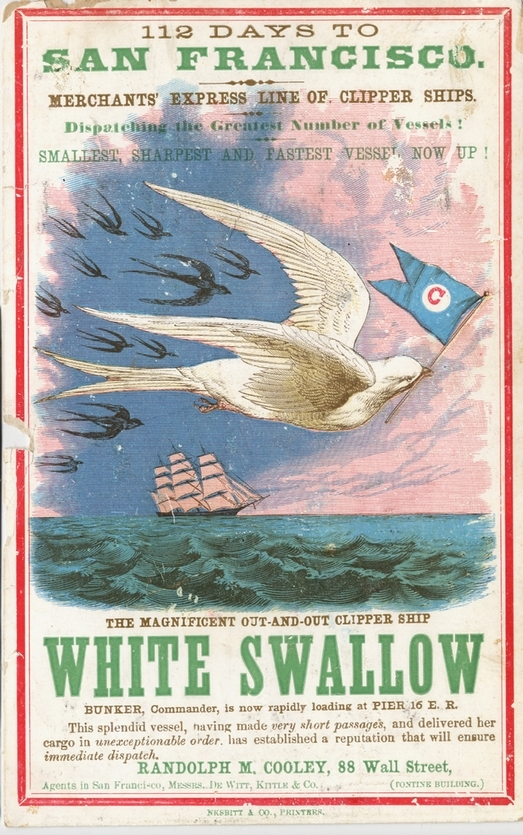
- White Swallow

History

United States
- Name: White Swallow
- Owner: William Lincoln and Co., Boston
- Builder: Hayden & Cudworth, Medford, MA

General characteristics
- Class & type: Extreme clipper
- Tons burthen: 192 tons

White Swallow was an extreme clipper built in Boston in 1853 for the California trade.

== Voyages ==
"She made three runs from Boston to S.F. and six from N.Y. to S.F. The fastest was 110 days and the slowest 150; average of the fastest 4, 122 days. She sailed from Boston April 18, 1860, and made land 40 miles south of the Golden Gate in 104 days."

== Mutiny and trial ==
White Swallow left New York in 1865 under Captain Elijah E. Knowles in "rum shape with rag-tag rigging"—in poor condition.

On February 2, 1866, the New York Times reported: "The crew of the clipper-ship White Swallow, just arrived from New-York, have been arrested for mutiny while off the coast of South America."

"According to the story of the crew, they were put to unnecessarily hard and dangerous work, forced by brutal beatings with brass knuckles, belaying pins and the like. One grievance was that they were put over the side on stagings while the ship was going ten knots and rolling and pitching heavily. Two men were lost overboard."

"The crew finally mutinied, seized the captain and mates and put them in irons, although the captain was allowed on deck to take observations and direct affairs, all his orders being fully obeyed. A written agreement was drawn up absolving the crew of all blame and promised good treatment. On arrival at S.F., however, six of the ringleaders were tried but were acquitted by the testimony of the passengers and admissions of the officers."

According to Dillon's Shanghaiing Days, “The name on everybody’s lips in 1865 on the embarcaderos of the world was White Swallow ... For a brief time, this enlightened attitude of the court was much remarked upon by seamen and landsmen alike. But it did not last ... In contrast to the White Swallow victory for sailors was a whole series of cases in which bucko mates and masters got off almost scot free.”

However, Gleason sees the influence of this case differently, stating that "For many years the White Swallow was famous in legal circles."

== Delivery of locomotive to San Francisco ==
White Swallow left New York on June 20, 1868, and arrived in San Francisco on October 25 of that year, carrying Central Pacific locomotive CP 72.

== Race with Golden Fleece ==
In 1868, Golden Fleece made a 44-day passage from San Francisco to Hong Kong, arriving three days before the White Swallow, which was known for her speed. White Swallow had left the Golden Gate with a two-day head start.

== Guano from McKean’s Island ==
“A Cargo of 1200 tons of guano, from McKean's Island, was brought into New London by the ship White Swallow on the 30th ult—the first importation from the Phoenix Guano Islands, discovered by C. A. Williams of New London a year ago. These islands lie in 170 West longitude 3½ south latitude, 2000 miles from the Hawaiian group. Mr. Williams took possession of them according to the law of 1856, and has since received a full title from the government.

"The islands are seven in number, and rich in guano deposits. Mr Williams is a member of the firm of C.A. Williams & Co. Honolulu, and Williams & Haven, New London. The Phoenix Guano Company was organized at New London, to work the guano beds, (which will prove a mine of wealth to the lucky owner) who has thirty or forty men permanently located there. Alfred Goddard is the squatter sovereign "governor" of the territory. When the White Swallow left, the Aspasia of Mystic, and Bowditch of New London were loading at McKean's Island, the only one worked at present."

=== Phoenix Guano ===
"This name is the title of a guano from McKean's Island, situated in the neighborhood of Baker and Jarvis Islands and occupied with a similar deposit. A sample representing the cargo of the White Swallow, imported by the general agents, Messrs. Williams and Haven, into this State, at the port of New London, gave me on analysis 23¼ percent of phosphoric acid, equivalent to 50 percent of bone-phosphate of lime, and I have not hesitated to recommend it to our farmers, especially, as I learn that the price will be entirely reasonable, viz: $27.50 per ton, or in quantities over five tons $25 per ton."

== Images ==
- White Swallow, oil painting by W.B. Eaton
