= History Channel =

US-based international cable and satellite TV channel

History
- Country: United States
- Broadcast area: Nationwide
- Headquarters: 235 E. 45th St., New York City, New York, U.S.

Programming
- Picture format: 1080i (HDTV)

Ownership
- Owner: A+E Global Media
- Sister channels: Military History; History en Español; History TV18

History
- Launched: January 1, 1995; 31 years ago

Links
- Website: history.com

Availability

Streaming media
- Service(s): Philo, Frndly TV, Sling TV, DirecTV Stream, Hulu + Live TV, Vidgo

History (formerly and commonly known as the History Channel) is an American pay television network and the flagship channel of A+E Global Media, a company owned by Hearst Communications.

The network was originally focused on history-based, social/science documentaries as well as the news. During the 2000s, the History Channel pivoted into reality television programming and ancient alien conspiracy hypotheses. Such shift in programming has made the History Channel a notable example of channel drift and network decay. In addition to this change in format, the network has been criticized by many scientists, historians, and skeptics for broadcasting pseudo-documentaries and pseudoscientific, unsubstantiated, sensational investigative programming.

As of November 2023, the History Channel is available to approximately 63,000,000 pay television households in the United States-down from its 2011 peak of 99,000,000 households. International localized versions of the History Channel are available, in various forms, in India, Canada, Europe, Australia, the Middle East, Africa, Asia and Latin America.

== History ==
=== Twentieth century ===
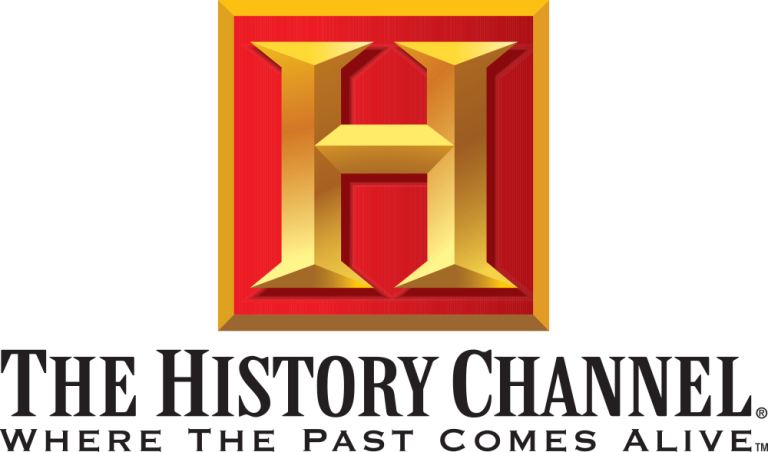
The History Channel's original logo used from January 1, 1995 to February 15, 2008, with the slogan "Where the past comes alive." In the station's early years, the red background was not there, and later it sometimes appeared blue (in documentaries), light green (in biographies), purple (in sitcoms), yellow (in reality shows), or orange (in short form content) instead of red.

The company indicated that plans for a history channel were in the works in 1993, it purchased the Lou Reda Productions documentary library and long-term rights for the Hearst Entertainment documentaries archive. The History Channel was launched on January 1, 1995, initially owned by A&E Television Networks. Its UK counterpart in a partnership with British Sky Broadcasting (now Sky UK), followed on November 1, 1995. Its original format focused entirely on historical series and specials.

In the 1990s, the channel was known for the amount of airtime it gave to World War II documentaries. In 1997, Salon.com's Mark Schone wrote in an article called "All Hitler, all the time" that the History Channel "airs as many as 40 hours of World War II programming weekly, and sometimes as many as 12 hours in a single day". Since then, much of its military-themed programming has been shifted to its sister network Military History.

A&E Networks considered the History Channel to be the driver in international expansion due to a lack of international rights to A&E international co-productions. As expected, the History Channel led A&E's overseas expansion in Brazil with TVA (April 1996), the Nordic and Baltic regions with Modern Times Group (1997), and in Canada (1997).

The History Channel expanded in 1998 into tours of US landmarks with Mayflower Tours having an affiliated website (historytravel.com), History Channel Traveler, and a planned quarterly magazine. While in October, the History Channel and MSG Network teamed up to produce several short-form sports history programs. A&E launched History International as a spin-off from the History Channel in November 1998, which was renamed H2 in 2011.

=== Twenty-first century ===
History's logo used from February 16, 2008 to May 31, 2015: The second logo does not have the triangle on the side of the H.

History's third logo used from June 1, 2015, to December 6, 2021

On February 16, 2008, a new logo was launched on the U.S. network as part of a rebranding effort. While the trademark "H" was kept, the triangle shape on the left acts as a play button for animation and flyouts during commercials and shows. On March 20, 2008, as part of that same rebranding effort, the History Channel dropped "The" and "Channel" from its name to become simply "History".

In 2012, half of A&E would be purchased by the Walt Disney Company and the other half by Hearst Communications, also putting History under their joint ownership.

In 2015, the channel would undergo another rebranding, this time by Joseph Kiely. The slogan of this rebranding was "Make Your Mark." The logo was slightly changed, but retained the golden letter 'H' that had become synonymous with the channel.

The "History 100" documentary initiative was announced in March 2018 that would produce 100 documentaries covering major events and notable figures from last 100 years.

On December 7, 2021, History received a major rebrand for the first time since February 16, 2008. The logo still kept the golden letter 'H' that had been used since its launch in 1995.

== H2 ==
H2
- Country: United States
- Broadcast area: Nationwide
- Headquarters: New York City

Programming
- Language: English
- Picture format: NTSC; HDTV 1080i

Ownership
- Owner: A&E Networks

History
- Launched: November 16, 1998
- Closed: February 29, 2016
- Replaced by: Viceland
- Former names: History International (1998–2011)

H2 was an American specialty television channel that was owned by A&E Networks, available on multi-channel television providers in the United States. It was launched on November 16, 1998 as History International (abbreviated as "HI" or variations of H-INT), a spin-off of the History Channel that focused on international history. On launch, History International occasionally featured shows in languages other than English, such as French or Spanish for use with the National Cable & Telecommunications Association's Cable in the Classroom initiative. By 2010, this was reduced to an hour-long Spanish language program on weekday mornings titled El Canal de Historia (the Spanish translation of The History Channel).

On September 26, 2011, the network was rebranded as H2, with its programming being refocused to feature documentary content from the main History channel prior to its shift towards more reality programming, along with original programs (such as the special The Universe: Beyond the Big Bang and the first-run series America's Book of Secrets), as well as exclusive new episodes of the former History series The Universe, Ancient Aliens and Modern Marvels, in addition to international-focused programming. H2 did not have plans to add reality series as its sister channel has done. Newer documentaries more recently seen on History migrated to the network as part of the rebrand, which would rotate with the documentaries from History International that primarily span from the mid-1990s to the mid-2000s.

In August 2014, A&E Networks acquired a 10% stake in Vice Media, and on November 3, 2015, A&E announced that H2 would be "replaced" by Viceland, a new lifestyle-focused network programmed by Vice Media. H2 signed off on February 29, 2016 at 6:00 a.m. ET, being replaced by pre-launch programming for Viceland.

As of January 2016, H2 was available to 70.1 million households in the United States.

== Programming ==
Programming on the History Channel has covered a wide range of historical periods and topics, while similar themed topics are often organized into themed weeks or daily marathons. Subjects include warfare, inventions, aviation, mechanical and civil engineering, technology, science, nature, artists, composers, authors, mythical creatures, monsters, unidentified flying objects, conspiracy theories, aliens, religious beliefs, disaster scenarios, apocalyptic "after man" scenarios, survival scenarios, alternate history, dinosaurs, doomsday, organized crime, secret societies, and 2012 superstitions. Occasionally, some programs compare contemporary culture and technology with that of the past.The channel's programming would expand into scripted dramas with the premiere of Vikings in 2013.

== Criticism and evaluations ==
Initially, the network received mixed reviews. In an article from the American Historical Association released about a year into the channel's lifespan, the channel's historical consultant Libby Haight O'Connell noted that professional historians have been enlisted to work on the channel's programs and many letters have come in from viewers both pointing out historical errors and opening up discussion with the channel creators about the events portrayed in the channel's programs.

In recent years the network has been criticized for having a bias towards US history. Another former sister network, History International, more extensively covered history outside the US until 2011, when it was re-branded as H2 and started broadcasting more material that had to do with US history.

Stanley Kutner criticized the network for the series The Men Who Killed Kennedy in 2003. Kutner was one of three historians commissioned to review the documentary, which the channel disavowed and never aired again. Programs such as Modern Marvels have been praised for their presentation of detailed information in an entertaining format.

Some of the network's series, including Ice Road Truckers, Ax Men, and Pawn Stars, garnered increased viewership ratings in the United States, while receiving criticism over the series' nonhistorical nature. US Senator Chuck Grassley is a critic of the channel and its lack of historical or educational programming, showing particular disdain for the latter two programs.

Professor Jeremy Stoddard, in his article published in 2010, raised the concern that the productions of the network presented value-laden perspectives which may mislead audiences, a phenomenon he termed "the History Channel effect". Stoddard argued that the History Channel did not contribute to this phenomenon alone, but rather it was caused by the misperception that documentaries are "objective sources of history".

In 2011, Forbes staffer Alex Knapp wrote, "The History Channel shouldn't run stuff like this 'ancient astronaut' nonsense." Forbes contributor Brad Lockwood criticized the channel's addition of "programs devoted to monsters, aliens, and conspiracies", attributing a perceived intent of boosting ratings to the network's decision to focus on pseudoarchaeology instead of documented facts. Knapp refers readers to the Bad Archaeology website's founder Keith Fitzpatrick-Matthews who comments, "I find it incredible and frightening that a worldwide distributed television channel ...can broadcast such rubbish as Ancient Aliens." Archaeologist Kenneth Feder, author of Frauds, Myths, and Mysteries: Science and Pseudoscience in Archaeology, called the channel's hosting the ancient astronaut theory "execrable bullshit".

In his book 2012: It's Not the End of the World, Peter Lemesurier describes the channel's Nostradamus series, in which he was invited to participate, as "largely fiction" and "lurid nonsense". He also lists numerous allusions made in its films to the alleged Mayan "end of the world" and the "rare" galactic alignment that was supposed by John Major Jenkins to accompany it in 2012, while Jenkins himself has described Decoding the Past as "45 minutes of unabashed doomsday hype and the worst kind of inane sensationalism."

In December 2011, Politifact gave the History Channel's claim that the United States Congress stayed open on Christmas Day for most of its first 67 years of existence a "pants on fire" rating, the lowest of its ratings, noting that its own research showed that both the Senate and the House had convened only once in those 67 years on a Christmas Day. It noted that because one in seven Christmases falls on a Sunday (when Congress does not meet to allow members to attend church), the claim is "ridiculous". The claim had first been broadcast on the History Channel program Christmas Unwrapped – The History of Christmas before being subsequently picked up by the American Civil Liberties Union's website on the "Origins of Christmas" and by the Comedy Central series The Daily Show. Daily Show host Jon Stewart responded the next day by stating it was their fault for trusting the History Channel and satirized a clip from the History Channel about UFOs and Nazis by stating, "The next thing you know we'll all find out the Nazis did not employ alien technology in their quest for world domination."

The History Channel was also singled out in a post for Smithsonian magazine. Science writer Riley Black took issue with the show Ancient Aliens for postulating the "idea that aliens caused the extinction of non-avian dinosaurs." The online magazine Cracked also lampooned the channel for its strange definition of history. Cracked singled out the programs UFO Hunters and Ancient Aliens as being the very definition of non-history by presenting pseudoscience and pseudohistory. In 2015, skeptic Brian Dunning listed it at No. 2 on a "Top 10 Worst Anti-Science Websites" list.

=== Amelia Earhart documentary controversy ===
In 2017, a History Channel documentary, Amelia Earhart: The Lost Evidence, proposed that a photograph in the National Archives of Jaluit Atoll in the Marshall Islands was actually a picture of a captured Amelia Earhart and Fred Noonan. The picture showed a Caucasian male on a dock who appeared to look like Noonan and a woman sitting on the dock, but facing away from the camera, who was judged to have a physique and haircut resembling Earhart's. The documentary theorizes that the photo was taken after Earhart and Noonan crashed at Mili Atoll. The documentary also said that physical evidence recovered from Mili matches pieces that could have fallen off an Electra during a crash or subsequent overland move to a barge. The Lost Evidence proposed that a Japanese ship seen in the photograph was the Koshu Maru, a Japanese military ship.

The Lost Evidence was soon discredited after Japanese blogger Kota Yamano found the original source of the photograph in the archives in the National Diet Library Digital Collection. The original source of the photo was a Japanese travel guide published in October 1935, implying that the photograph was taken in 1935 or before, thus it would be unrelated to Earhart and Noonan's 1937 disappearance. Additionally, the researcher who discovered the photo also identified the ship in the right of the photo as another ship called Koshu seized by Allied Japanese forces in World War I and not the Koshu Maru.

Researcher Ben Radford performed a detailed analysis of the mistakes made by The History Channel in building their documentary on bad photographic evidence. In his Skeptical Inquirer article "A Funny Thing Happened on the Way to the Emmys: An Amelia Earhart Special (Non) Mystery Post-Mortem", critiquing the network's lack of professionalism, Radford said: "Given that the photograph's provenance was established and thus the key premise of the show discredited in about half an hour of Google searching, it will be interesting to see what world class expertise... the History Channel will bring to their reinvestigation of Earhart's disappearance." On episode 82 of his Squaring the Strange podcast, released January 4, 2019, Radford reminded listeners that in excess of 18 months had passed without an apology or explanation from the History Channel as to "how their research went so horribly wrong."

== Military History Channel ==
Military History
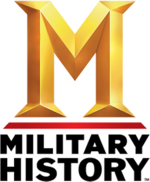
- Country: United States
- Headquarters: New York, New York

Programming
- Language: English
- Picture format: 480i (SDTV) (most current-day programming presented in widescreen letterbox)

Ownership
- Owner: A+E Global Media

History
- Launched: January 5, 2005; 21 years ago
- Former names: Military History Channel (2005–08)

Availability

Streaming media
- Services: Hulu + Live TV, Frndly TV, Philo

Military History is a spin-off from the History channel featuring reruns of programs about the history of the military and significant combat events. The channel's main competitor is Warner Bros. Discovery's American Heroes Channel, formerly the Military Channel.

=== History ===
Military History was launched on January 5, 2005, after demand for more military history programs. Beginning on March 27, 2004, a military-history programming block started on now defunct network History International as a prologue. The launch was an open preview, or soft launch, as no cable operators were signed up. Dan Davids, president of the History Channel USA, planned to push for digital basic level cable carriage. Its initial programming library drew from A&E and History's programs. The channel's initial prime time shows were under an umbrella banner of "Battle History", which consisted of five documentary miniseries featuring each of the US military services. In the second quarter of 2005, the channel had its hard launch.

Like its parent channel, the channel dropped the word "Channel" from its name on March 20, 2008. Its carriage is limited to expanded tier and add-on pay-TV packages as a niche offering, and it is one of the few mainstream American cable channels in English still carried only in standard definition.

=== Programming ===
Military History features programs that focus on historical battles and wars, as well as programs that profile key individuals such as generals, soldiers and spies. It also airs documentaries and series that provide insight into how these wars were fought and the lives of those who served in them.

Its programming library draws from A&E and History's program libraries with an emphasis on World War II.

== History en Español ==
History en Español
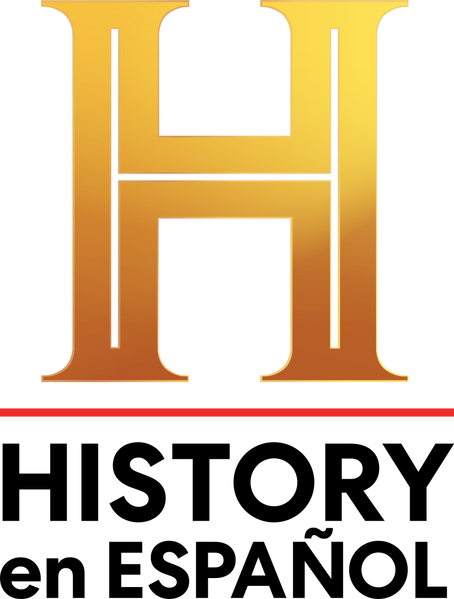
- Country: United States and Latin America

Programming
- Language: Spanish
- Picture format: 480i SDTV

History
- Launched: June 24, 2004; 22 years ago
- Former names: The History Channel en Español (2004–08)

Links
- Website: www.historyenespanol.com

Availability

Streaming media
- Services: Sling TV, Hulu + Live TV, Vidgo, FuboTV

History en Español is an American Spanish-language pay television channel. The network launched on June 24, 2004, as a counterpart to History focusing mainly on Hispanic America and world history. The network shows original programming, as well as Spanish-dubbed programs from the English-language version.

== Other media ==
=== DVD ===
- The Unknown Hitler DVD collection, including Hitler and the Occult
- Dogfight: Season 1 DVD set
- The Great Depression DVD collection
- The Making of Trump 2015 DVD

=== Video serials ===
- Legend of the Superstition Mountains six episodes in 2015
- History Legends of War: Patton
- The History Channel: Lost Worlds
- The History Channel: Battle of Britain 1940
- The History Channel: Crusades – Quest for Power
- The History Channel: Alamo – Fight for Independence
- The History Channel: Civil War – Great Battles
- The History Channel: Digging for Truth
- The History Channel: Great Battles Medieval
- The History Channel: Civil War The Battle of Bull Run Take Command: 1861
- The History Channel: American Civil War Take Command: 2nd Manassas

=== Video games ===
- The History Channel: Civil War – A Nation Divided (2006)
- The History Channel: ShootOut! – The Game (2006)
- The History Channel: Dogfights – The Game (2007)
- The History Channel: Great Battles of Rome (2007)
- The History Channel: Battle for the Pacific (2007)
- History Civil War: Secret Missions (2008)
- History: Great Empires – Rome (2009)
- History: Ice Road Truckers (2010)
- History: Egypt – Engineering an Empire (2010)
- History: Great Battles – Medieval (2010)
- History Legends of War: Patton (2013)

== International ==
=== North America ===
==== Canada ====
History Television launched in 1997 and was not initially related to its then similarly named American counterpart. During History Television's first several years of operation, despite sharing a similar programming focus, it rarely, if ever, acquired programming from the American channel. The phrase "Not available in Canada" was used heavily during The History Channel's early years in promotional ads on American channels that were imported to Canadian pay television providers, particularly A&E.

Beginning in the late 2000s, several History (US) shows were acquired for Canadian broadcast on History Television. On May 30, 2012, then-parent company Shaw Media announced that it would rebrand History Channel as a Canadian version of the US History channel in the fall of 2012, through a licensing agreement with A+E Networks. History Television would be relaunched on August 12, 2012, with another Shaw-owned specialty channel relaunched as a Canadian version of H2 soon after.

On October 21, 2014, Corus Entertainment reached an agreement to acquire Canadian French-language rights to History programming for its own channel, Historia. On March 9, 2015, the network was relaunched under History's logo and branding, although the network still carries the Historia name. Historia was previously owned as a joint venture between Shaw and Astral Media, which made it a sister to History; Corus purchased the network in 2013.

On April 1, 2016, Corus Entertainment merged with Shaw Media, and as a result, now holds the Canadian English and French-language rights to History programming.

=== Europe ===
==== UK and Ireland ====
The British version launched in November 1995, and arrived in Ireland on November 1, 1999. The UK channel is a joint venture with Sky UK and was renamed Sky History on May 27, 2020, incorporating content from Sky Documentaries and Sky Nature.

==== Germany ====
The German version launched on November 14, 2004, and is operated by The History Channel Germany GmbH & Co. KG, a joint venture between A+E Networks and NBCUniversal International Networks.

==== Italy ====
The Italian version was launched on July 31, 2003, as a joint venture of A&E Networks and the local office division of Fox Networks Group; then it became a sole venture of A&E Networks in 2012.

==== Spain and Portugal ====
The History Channel is available in Spain and Portugal though cable, satellite, and IPTV platforms, as well as streaming media under the brand Canal de Historia. The History Channel Iberia is a joint venture between A+E Networks and AMC Networks International Southern Europe.

==== Benelux ====
The Dutch version launched on May 1, 2007. This version is distributed by A&E Networks Benelux. In January 2008, History HD was launched in the Netherlands. It is available on cable providers Telenet and Ziggo. It is also available on the IPTV service KPN.

==== Poland ====
A Polish version was launched on April 9, 2008. It is available on cable providers Aster, Dialog, Toya, and UPC Poland, and also through satellite television (with its HD version carried on the n platform since June 1, 2012) and an SD version on Cyfra+ (now Canal+), the latter since November 2, 2009.

==== Scandinavia ====
A Scandinavian version was first launched in September 1997, broadcasting for three and later four hours a day on the analogue Viasat platform. Initially time-sharing with TV1000 Cinema, it was later moved to the Swedish TV8 channel and continued broadcasting there until November 2004. When History channel announced their own 24-hour pan-European channel, Viasat launched its own history-oriented channel, Viasat History, in the Nordic region, but with no original programming. On February 1, 2007, the History Channel returned to Sweden and also Denmark, Norway, Finland when the pan-European version was launched as a standalone channel on the Canal Digital satellite platform and later through cable operator Com hem. The History Channel launched on February 1, 2007, on the Canal Digital DTH satellite package for viewers in Norway, Sweden, Denmark and Finland. The channel is being launched by The History Channel UK, A&E's joint venture with BSkyB. Although it broadcasts in English with local subtitles, the channel is scheduled separately from the UK version.

=== Asia ===
==== India ====
The History Channel started its operations in India in late 2003 with 21st Century Fox's STAR TV as its sales partner, managed by National Geographic until November 21, 2008. The History Channel India closed down on November 21, 2008. In 2011, History was granted permission to relaunch services in India. A joint venture of A&E Networks and TV18 relaunched History TV18 in India in eight languages in 2014.

==== Southeast Asia ====
A joint venture of AETN and Astro Malaysia Holdings launched the History Channel in Singapore, Hong Kong, Thailand, the Philippines, Malaysia, Indonesia, Vietnam and Brunei in the second and third quarters of 2007, and in Taiwan and China by the end of the year. Some other Asian countries, such as Kuwait, Israel, and Japan, have their own versions of the network. On September 1, 2008, History Channel Asia was officially launched in Singapore and Hong Kong followed by the Philippines.

==== South Korea ====
The South Korean version of History Channel was launched on September 22, 2017, replacing the Southeast version that was previously transmitted. After the launch, A+E networks Korea launched an original series program called History in the Bottle (말술클럽).

=== Latin America ===
The Latin American version was launched in 2001. It is owned by A&E and controlled in the region by Ole Distribution. It airs US programming, translated to Spanish or Portuguese or in English with Spanish or Portuguese subtitles. Also, it develops some Latin American programming in Spanish.

=== Oceania ===
==== Australia and New Zealand ====
The Australian version of History, now Real History, is operated by Foxtel and the programming and name of the channel were previously licensed to them by A&E Networks, from 1998 to 2024.

=== Africa ===
The History Channel was launched on December 1, 2003, on the DStv satellite TV platform provided by MultiChoice in South Africa for Sub-Saharran Africa; it is currently on the DStv Compact Plus package.

== See also ==
- List of programs broadcast by the History Channel
- Viceland
