= Cat's Paw (brand) =

American rubber heels and soles brand

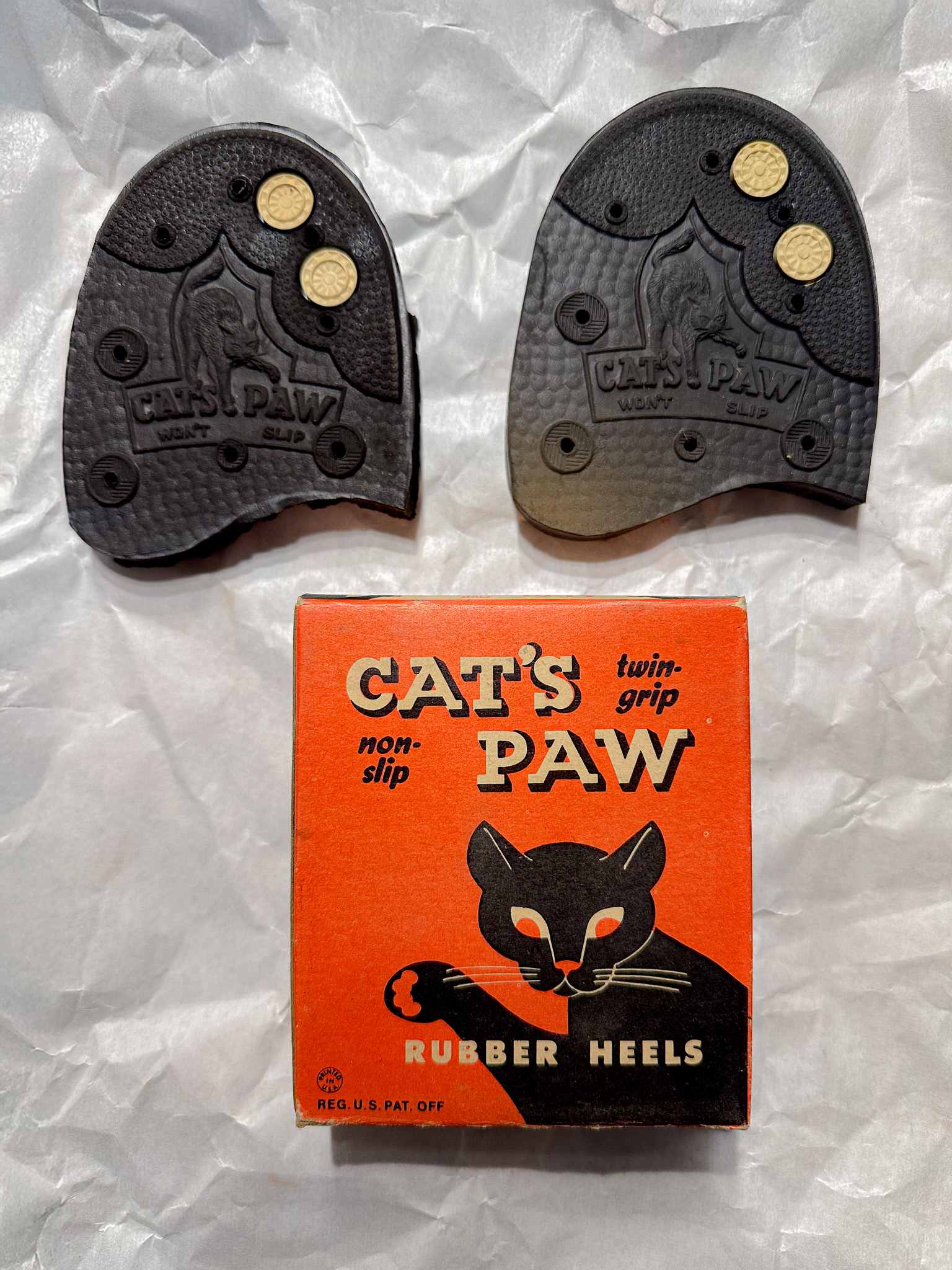
- A deadstock sample of Cat's Paw packaging and heels produced under the Cat's Paw Rubber Company.
- Product type: Rubber heels and soles
- Current owner: Vibram
- Country: United States
- Introduced: 1904
- Discontinued: 1980s
- Markets: North America
- Previous owners: Foster Rubber Co.; Holtite Manufacturing Co.; Cat's Paw Rubber Co.; American Biltrite; Biltrite; Quabaug

Cat's Paw was an American brand that manufactured rubber heels and soles starting in 1904. It was best known for its slip-resistant rubber heels, featuring distinctive white dots that were claimed to provide additional traction by extending under the wearer's weight. In the 1950s, it was the largest manufacturer of rubber heels and soles in the United States.

Today, deadstock Cat's Paw products are sought after for their unique design and historical significance. Due to the increasing rarity and decay of such deadstock items, some manufacturers have begun producing faithful reproductions.

== History ==
Cat's Paw products were first produced in 1904 by Foster Rubber Co., a rubber manufacturer based in Boston, Massachusetts. Their distinctive heel with two dots was patented in 1909 by Rolon E. Foster and Philip W. Pratt.

Foster Rubber Co. was later acquired by Holtite Manufacturing Co. out of Baltimore. In 1936 an officer at the company, Albert A. Esterson, founded Cat's Paw Rubber Company Inc., and started selling Cat's Paw products under the homonymous brand. The Baltimore plant was located at Warner and Ostend Streets and, due to its extreme noise levels, employed a considerable number of deaf workers, most of which were black. Esterson later founded a second Cat's Paw Rubber Company, this time in Canada. Under his leadership, Cat's Paw Rubber Co. achieved commercial success, becoming the largest manufacturer of rubber heels and soles in the United States during the 1950s.

The rights to produce Cat's Paw products changed hands a few times, starting in 1967 when American Biltrite acquired Cat's Paw Rubber Company. They eventually stopped production and sold the company to Quabaug, which in turn was acquired by Vibram, who holds the copyright today.

== Design ==
The distinguishing feature of Cat's Paw heels is a pair of recessed white dots made of harder rubber than the rest of the sole. These dots, also known as "friction plugs" or "vacuum-action grippers," were slightly recessed, but were claimed to extend under the wearer's weight in order to provide additional friction.

Cat's Paw packaging featured a black cat from the start, changing the design a few times. The stylized black cat with a raised paw that became most associated with the brand was designed in 1941 by German graphic designer Lucian Bernhard.

== Cultural influence ==
Because of its commercial success, distinctive packaging, and historical significance, the Cat's Paw brand has endured in popularity to this day, long after production stopped. Various contemporary boot brands, like Oak Street Bootmakers, Nick's, and Viberg, have released limited edition boots featuring deadstock Cat's Paw heels. Boots from Lone Wolf, a brand of Japanese menswear company TOYO Enterprise, feature new stock Cat's Paw soles faithfully reproduced using original vintage molds of Cat's Paw products. Chao-Yung Lin (Chinese: 林照詠; pinyin: Zhàoyǒng Lín), founder of Taiwanese brand of outsoles Dr. Soles, admires Cat's Paw, and claims that buying 300 deadstock packs of Cat's Paw heels helped him start his brand.

In 1991 a Cat's Paw heel was found on the island of Nikumaroro by a team of investigators of The International Group for Historic Aircraft Recovery (TIGHAR). The discovery contributed to forming one of the leading theories of the disappearance of Amelia Earhart, who wore a matching shoe days prior to her final flight.

The insignia of USS Colahan was inspired by an early Cat's Paw logo.
