= The History Channel: Civil War – A Nation Divided =

2006 video game

- Xbox 360 cover art
- Developer: Cauldron HQ
- Publisher: Activision Value
- Producer: Chris Owen
- Designers: Michal Smrkal; Martin Hornák
- Composers: Juraj Karkuš; Ľubomír Ruttkay
- Engine: CloakNT
- Platforms: Microsoft Windows, PlayStation 2, Xbox 360
- Release: NA: November 7, 2006
- Genre: First-person shooter
- Mode: Single player

The History Channel: Civil War – A Nation Divided is a 2006 historical first-person shooter video game developed by Cauldron HQ, released on November 7, 2006, by Activision Value and the History Channel for Microsoft Windows, PlayStation 2 and Xbox 360. It garnered mostly mixed reviews.

== Overview ==
The story line for A Nation Divided is relatively short, spanning twelve levels based on some of the most well known battles of the American Civil War. One can play as either a Confederate Soldier or a Union Soldier. The player plays as a different soldier during each battle.

== Battles ==
During the game, the player can play through a total of twelve different battles from the Civil War. The battles are divided into two campaigns: North and South. Each campaign contains six historic battles. The player must play through each battle to unlock the next one. After the first five battles are completed for each side, Cold Harbor is unlocked. Upon this battle's completion, Petersburg is unlocked.

Union

- Fredericksburg (Pvt. Jeremy Burnet, 2nd Wisconsin Volunteer Infantry Regiment, Iron Brigade)
- Gettysburg (Pvt. Ellis Spear, 20th Maine Volunteer Infantry Regiment)
- Chattanooga (Pvt. Colin Geary, Army of the Cumberland)
- Fort Fisher (Pvt. Jim O'Neal, United States Marines)
- Selma (Pvt. John Howard, Eli Long's Division, Military Division of the Mississippi)
- Petersburg (Pvt. Frank Adams)

Confederate

- Bull Run (Manassas) (Pvt. James G. Hudson, 4th Alabama Infantry Regiment)
- Shiloh (Pvt. Rufus T. Neale, 19th Tennessee Infantry Regiment)
- Antietam (Sharpsburg) (Pvt. William R. Mervine, Robert Toomb's Corps)
- Chancellorsville (Pvt. Ralph Stockton, 5th Alabama Infantry Regiment)
- Chickamauga (Pvt. James T. Lockhart, Longstreet's Corps)
- Cold Harbor (Pvt. Mosley Stokes, Army of Northern Virginia)

== Gameplay ==
Weapons of the war are portrayed accurately and have corresponding reloading processes. For example, the rifled musket reloading process is lengthy, while the revolver's is quick. The game fails to separate the two factions and has one rifled musket, the Springfield. While the Confederates used them as field pickups they primarily used the Pattern 1853 Enfield.

Melee combat is also a large part of the game, just as it was during the war. The Bowie knife and the cavalry saber are some of the melee weapons.

Each battle can be played on one of three difficulty modes: Easy, Normal and Hard. Completing the game on any mode unlocks an achievement.

No multiplayer features are present in the title, but the Xbox 360 version does support Leaderboards on Xbox Live. While the game specifications do include Downloadable Content, no content was released.

== Reception ==
Reception

Aggregate scores
Aggregator	Score
GameRankings	56%
Metacritic	53/100

Review scores
Publication	Score
GameSpot	(PC) 5.5/10 (PS2) 5.2/10 (X360) 5.3/10
GamesRadar+	2.5/5
IGN	5/10

Upon its release, Civil War received mixed reviews with the main criticisms being stale gameplay, average graphics, low difficulty, poor AI, and the short length of the game, also, many people complained about various historical mistakes, or even lack of important details (like incorrect uniforms, lack of various infantries and regiments which is especially noticeable during the Bull Run level). However, many critics were pleased by the unique setting and fresh gameplay.

Mathew Robson from Gamerant listed the game # 5 of his "5 Games Set During The American Civil War", stating "despite mixed reviews from critics, this title has gained a deserving amount of esteem, notably due to the fresh gameplay, accurate representation of firearms and historic battles, and even the chaotic noises and sounds one might have heard upon the battlegrounds, certifying this title's position as iconic to American Civil Wargames."

== Sequel ==
In 2008, a sequel titled History Civil War: Secret Missions was released.
