= Michael Jebsen =

- Born: 27 September 1835; Apenrade, Duchy of Schleswig
- Died: 30 September 1899 (aged 64); Berlin, Germany
- Occupations: Ship's captain Ship owner Entrepreneur; Politician
- Political party: NLP
- Spouse: Clara Anna Offermann (1844–1913)
- Children: Jacob Jebsen (1870–1941); Emma Jebsen/ von Hassel (1885–1960) and seven others
- Parent(s): Michael Jebsen; Maria Ehlers

Michael Jebsen (27 September 1835 – 30 September 1899) was a ship's captain and ship owner. He is seen by the company as a progenitor of what became the Jebsen Group, a trading and manufacturing company co-founded in Hong Kong on 1 March 1895 by his son Jacob Jebsen (1870–1941). During the early 1870s, with his own business interests increasingly centred on Europe, he returned to the town of his birth which was by now in Germany. In his final years he turned to politics, becoming a local senator in 1883 and a member of the national parliament ("Reichstag") in 1890.

== Life ==
=== Family provenance and early years ===
Michael Jebsen was born into a Protestant family in Apenrade, a flourishing bilingual trading port in a sheltered location on the eastern side of Schleswig, still an independent duchy, but increasingly coveted by the rulers of adjacent Denmark and nearby Prussia. Jebsen's father was also called Michael Jebsen (1793–1863) and was also a ship's captain based in Apenrade, where the Jebsens had been prominent members of the shipping community since the early years of the eighteenth century. Michael Jebsen and his twin sister, Thilde Christine, were the youngest of their parents' children.

As an adolescent Jebsen briefly undertook an apprenticeship as a sail maker, but there was never any doubt that he would go to sea. In 1851, when he was 16, he joined the crew of the Hamburg-based full-rigged ship "Georg Heinrich" as a ship's boy. Between 1851 and 1873 he was working at sea: fifteen of those years were spent as a ship's captain on long voyages. His years at sea were not entirely uninterrupted, however. After several trips to South America he disembarked at London and then returned home early in 1853 to attend a navigation school in Loit-Skovby run by a retired ship's captain called Peter Boysen. Jebsen already knew Boysen, who had commanded the "Georg Heinrich" when Jebsen was working his first voyage. It is on record that at the end of the three-month course he passed his exams in July "comfortably".

=== Seafarer and captain ===
After a brief further stint as a sailor, in 1854 Jebsen joined the Apenrade barque "Otto" as third mate. In 1856, still aged only 21, he was given his first command. His ship was the Peruvian barque "Joven Emilio", and he was its captain for two years. Between February 1859 and July 1860 he served as first officer on the ocean going steam ship "Antonius Varas". There followed a brief assignment as a captain in Valparaíso in Chile, before he returned to Europe, disembarking in Hamburg. Hamburg was part of the German Confederation whereas Schleswig, despite growing pressure from commercial interests, was not. In his linguistically divided home town of Apenrade the Jebsen family were part of the German-speaking community, and in an age of growing nationalist sentiment the cultural distinctions which might have gone unnoticed a few years earlier were gaining in practical significance. In 1861 Captain Michael Jebsen acquired Hamburg citizenship, one visible sign of which was that ships under his command were no longer required to fly the Dannebrog (Danish flag).

Jebsen made his first visit to Hong Kong in 1864 while captaining the barque "Notos", owned by the Hamburg firm Hastedt & Co. There is a suggestion that around this time, identifying the competitive advantage that might be available from focusing on steam ships rather than on traditional sailing barques, he developed plans to found his own shipping company, which could help to revive the shipping industry in his home town, but these plans had to be postponed, partly because of geo-political developments, and during most of the 1860s he was working out of Hamburg. The Franco-Prussian War of 1870/71 inhibited trade along the route to Hong Kong, since French warships were blockading trade with China.

=== Family matters ===
In 1867, while on shore leave, he married Clara Anna Offermann (1844–1913), the daughter of a ship's captain. According to the New German Biographical Dictionary the marriage resulted in two sons and two daughters, but sources closer to the family state that there were four sons and four daughters, which may indicate that several of their children died in infancy. Clara accompanied her husband on his next few voyages, which he undertook as captain - and according to one source now also as the owner - of the barques "Ceyphrus" und "Galathea". It was not unusual for ships' captains to travel accompanied by their wives, despite the complications presented by the possibilities of pregnancy and childbirth. Clara gave birth to their son, Jacob, in December 1870, albeit on dry land, while they were docked at Port Townsend on the coast of what later became Washington state. Michael Jebsen's next lengthy stay ashore and at home in Apenrade, Schleswig having been administered by Prussia since 1864, and subsumed into it in 1866. That made Apenrade part of the new German state with effect from 1871. Early in 1873 Jebsen embarked on his final voyage as a ship's captain, in command of the Hamburg registered steam ship "Luxor". In October of that year he returned once more to Apenrade, at the age of 38 starting a new life, ashore, "for good".

=== Ship owner ashore ===
In 1874 Michael Jebsen took a job with the mega-magnate Alfred Krupp. His duties in charge of the shipping and forwarding business based in Vlissingen (later Rotterdam) meant moving with his family to the Netherlands for a few years. He continued to work for Krupp till 1882, despite handing in his notice (which at this stage was amicably declined) in 1878. Jebsen continued to nurture ambitions beyond his work for Krupp, and had set up his own company, "M. Jebsen" in 1874 in support of his intentions. In 1878 the company moved, with him, to Rotterdam. On 23 November 1878 he registered a new company in Rotterdam, "Partenreederei M. Jebsen", in connection with his purchase of a steam ship which quickly proved to be only the first of several such acquisitions. Jebsen continued to place faith in the prospects for trade with China, and shortly after he launched his shipping business the "Vorwaerts" was the first of his steam ships to arrive in Hong Kong, flying his company's flag which, like the crest of his home town, depicted three mackerel (identified in the Cantonese patois as "three-piecey-fish") flapping in the sea breeze. By 1897 there were no fewer than 14 steam-ships, and the focus of the business remained on the East Asian routes.

=== Politics ===
By 1883 Jebsen had been able to relocate back to Apenrade where he was elected a " senator" (member of the local council). In 1890 he was elected to the national parliament ("Reichstag") where he represented the Flensburg electoral district, sitting as a member of the National Liberal Party (" Nationalliberale Partei" / NLP). He was re-elected in 1893, but not in 1898. He was a member of several Reichstag committees, including those concerned with disease control, the slave trade, emigration, accident insurance and various aspects of shipping. In the chamber he argued strongly for naval expansion in order to protect the colonies, and was a member of the marine budget commission. In some quarters he became known affectionately (if inaccurately) as "The Admiral".

In 1898 he was elected a member of the lower chamber of the Prussian parliament (Landtag).

=== Bismarck memorial ===
Although Apenrade and the commercially vibrant area around it were predominantly German speaking, the northern part of Schleswig taken as a whole was predominantly rural and Danish speaking. German speakers in north Schleswig were a minority. This would be demonstrated in 1920 when plebiscites were held as a result of which north Schleswig was transferred to Denmark (while south Schlesig remains part of Germany). During the 1890s, following the chancellor's reluctant resignation, there was a great surge in the construction of Bismarck monuments. This resonated particularly strongly with the German-speaking minority in North Schleswig. Michael Jebsen took a lead in the campaign to fund and construct an appropriate meeting place for the German speakers on the Knivsberg projection a couple of kilometers inland, to the north of Apenrade. Jebsen was a co-founder of the Knivsberg Society set up in 1893, and he was its first chairman, launching the fund raising with his own 10,000 Mark donation. His special focus was on the erection of a Bismarck memorial tower at the highest point of the outcrop, and the foundation stone of the construction was duly set in place in 1895. However, Michael Jebsen was no longer available to preside at the dedication of the memorial, which was instead undertaken, in 1901, in the presence of his son.

=== Death ===
During the late summer of 1899, while visiting a spa resort, Michael Jebsen was taken ill. He was transferred to Berlin where he underwent an operation and, on 30 September, died. Two months later, in a ceremony that was very much quieter than must have been envisaged on 28 May 1899 when he couple announced their engagement, his daughter Johanne married her cousin, Heinrich Jessen, consolidating family connections that underpinned the Hong Kong-based Jebsen Group.

== See also ==
- Koshu (survey ship), a German cargo ship called the Michael Jebsen from 1904–1914, named after him
