= Jeff Glickman =

American computer scientist and entrepreneur

Jeff Glickman is an American computer scientist and entrepreneur. He specializes in artificial intelligence, image processing and stochastic computation. He designed and built an AI driven investment advisor for the company J4 Capital which he founded in 2017. The AI is reportedly performing better than any other known AI-advised technology with a success rate of 60% i.e. for every trade it is correct 60% of the time.

In 2010, Glickman spotted an Amelia Earhart-related anomaly in a tiny 75-year-old black-and-white photo giving a possible clue to her fate. A 2019 search of the island suggests that the object in the photo resembles local rocks.
