= Enduring Valor: Gettysburg in Miniature =

Enduring Valor: Gettysburg in Miniature is a series of two popular scenario books written for miniature wargaming the American Civil War Battle of Gettysburg in regimental scale. It is based upon the Johnny Reb gaming rules developed by veteran game designer John Hill.

Inspired by the scenarios in the classic board game Terrible Swift Sword, Volume 1 of Enduring Valor was first published in 2002 by Marek/Janci Design of Wheaton, Illinois, and debuted at the Historicon gaming convention. It covers the Gettysburg campaign from the June 26, 1863, skirmish at Witmer Farm to the July 2 fighting at Little Round Top. The second volume was published in 2004 and covers the rest of the battle through Falling Waters, including Pickett's Charge. A third scenario book, Crossed Sabers: Gettysburg in Miniature, covers the cavalry during the campaign, from Brandy Station through Gettysburg.

Certain scenarios left out of the original books have appeared in past issues of CHARGE! magazine.
