= Darkest of Days =

2009 video game

- Developer: 8monkey Labs
- Publishers: Phantom EFX; Valcon Games (Xbox 360); Virtual Programming (Mac OS X)
- Platforms: Windows; Xbox 360; Mac OS X
- Release: NA: September 8, 2009; AU: November 5, 2009 (PC); EU: 2009 (PC); Mac OS X December 22, 2010
- Genre: First-person shooter
- Mode: Single-player

Darkest of Days is a first-person shooter video game developed by 8monkey Labs and published by Phantom EFX. Originally released for the Xbox 360, it was also released for Microsoft Windows via Steam. On December 22, 2010, Virtual Programming published the Mac OS X version of the game. As of August 24, 2021, Darkest of Days is unavailable for purchase on Steam.

The game follows a soldier recruited by a mysterious time travel organization to find a missing scientist. Time periods featured include the American Indian Wars, the American Civil War, World War I, World War II, and Ancient Rome.

== Plot ==
In Darkest of Days the player controls Alexander Morris, a soldier fighting in General Custer's battalion during the Battle of Little Big Horn at the beginning of the game. After Custer is killed and Morris is wounded he is suddenly rescued by a man in futuristic armor and taken through a strange portal. Morris then awakens in the headquarters of Kronotek, an organization that has managed to develop time travel technology and is apparently dedicated to researching and protecting history. A Kronotek higher-up known as "Mother" tells Morris that Doctor Koell, the organization's founder, has gone missing and disturbances have started appearing through history, causing individuals that have played key roles in history to be placed in danger, and tasks Morris with helping Kronotek restore history.

Morris then begins his combat training with his new partner Agent Dexter, another MIA from history who is implied to have gone missing on 9/11. As he is from the 1800s, he requires a crash course in "modern" weaponry (ranging from World War I to the late 22nd century). Upon completion of his training Mother tasks Morris and Dexter with tracking down two individuals who are not where they are supposed to be: one Corporal Welsh from the Union Army in the American Civil War at the Battle of Antietam, and a Russian Army Officer named Petrovich in World War I at the Battle of Tannenberg.

However, completion of both of these tasks is blocked by a mysterious group known only as the Opposition, which also has time-travel technology. Over the course of the game, Morris and Dexter have to fight through both the Battle of Antietam and the Battle of Tannenberg, which involve massive cornfield battles, the dynamiting of a train bridge, and the hijacking of a zeppelin. Although Agents Morris and Dexter manage to secure and reintegrate Welsh and his twin brother into the proper timeframe, Petrovich is labeled a traitor for abandoning his post. This causes his son, who was originally going to become a scientist, to enlist in the Russian Army during the Second World War, leading to his capture by the Wehrmacht. When Agents Morris and Dexter try to rescue him before he reaches a POW camp, Morris is also captured and sent to the camp.

After spending some time in the camp, Petrovich is sentenced to death because of an escape attempt, but right before his execution, an explosion goes off outside the camp. Agent Dexter appears and assists Morris, Petrovich and the other inmates in escaping. Once Petrovich reaches safety, Dexter informs Morris that Morris was the one who set the explosive, allowing Dexter to infiltrate the camp. So Morris goes back, fights his way through a Nazi facility, and sets the explosive that triggers his own release.

After rescuing Petrovich, Morris and Dexter find out that Koell is at Pompeii, on August 25, 79 AD, the day Mount Vesuvius erupted and buried the Roman town. Agents Morris and Dexter and a tech specialist named Bob fight through hordes of Opposition agents to find Koell, who is in the town's arena. Koell then nonchalantly accompanies Morris and Dexter back to the 22nd century.

Upon arriving in the 22nd century, a strange man appears, claiming to be the head of the Opposition. (It later transpires that the Opposition is a future version of Kronotek). The man asks Koell if it is wrong to change terrible events that already happened, to which Koell answers yes, because "dark days teach valuable lessons and define who we are". The Man then shoots Koell twice, once in the chest and once in the head. When confronted by Morris and Dexter, he explains that the Welshes and Petrovich were ancestors of scientists who invented a DNA sequencer that can target the genomes defining racial identity. He goes on to explain that this DNA sequencer was stolen and used by less talented Middle Eastern scientists to create a virus that targeted people of European descent. 2 billion died as a result (including eight out of every ten people in North America). As Dexter laments the loss of his family, the strange man states that this crisis has been averted because of the Opposition's interference with the time stream. He also says that they tried to make Koell change his mind about changing past events, but even with direct evidence that changing that event would not affect the timeline couldn't convince him, so they went with the last resort of killing him. Although he makes clear that Kronotek's ultimate goal is still the preservation of the time stream, he indicates that this one exception was made. The strange man then says that his Kronotek has use for talented agents such as Morris and Dexter and invites them to join his agency, leaving an open time bubble for them to enter. As the strange man departs, Dexter looks at the camera and says, "What the Hell do we do now brother?"

== Development ==
Since the premise of Darkest of Days leans heavily on the historical aspect of its story, the developers focused on making the battles as historically accurate as possible. They incorporated extensive research on the time periods, locations, and weapons for each of the battles depicted in the game (much of the city of Pompeii is accurately recreated). Darkest of Days uses NVIDIA PhysX, a hardware-accelerated physics engine.

"It was critical to the success of Darkest of Days that these epic moments in world history are experienced in eerily accurate detail, and NVIDIA PhysX technology helped us achieve that goal," said Mark Doeden, Art Director at 8monkey Labs. "Our Marmoset Engine brings these battles to life with a completely unique look, and the PhysX technology was instrumental in making the game feel alive and real."

8Monkey Labs designed the Marmoset engine specifically for the game. The Marmoset engine can handle over 300 characters on the screen at one time, enabling the game to have densely populated battle scenes, all with their own AI and pathfinding. Darkest of Days also contains wide open battlefields, allowing players to choose their own course of action to accomplish the goals set in the game (however, there are numerous limitations imposed on a player's movements throughout a map via obstacles and invisible walls). The player is also equipped with futuristic weapons adding a unique twist to classic battles. Marmoset's AI is able to drive behaviors for hundreds of characters simultaneously, without impeding gameplay. All actions share a common set of sensory data - audio, vision, navigation, teammate signals, enemy fire detection, and object finding and following are all easily made available to all behaviors.

== Reception ==
Reception

Aggregate score
Aggregator	Score	
Aggregator	PC	Xbox 360
Metacritic	51/100	44/100

Review scores
Publication	Score	
Publication	PC	Xbox 360
Destructoid	N/A	1/10
GamePro	N/A	2/5
GameRevolution	N/A	D+
GameSpot	4.5/10	4.5/10
GameTrailers	N/A	4.4/10
GameZone	5.4/10	5.5/10
IGN	4/10	3.6/10
Official Xbox Magazine (US)	N/A	6.5/10
PC Gamer (UK)	80%	N/A
TeamXbox	N/A	3.8/10
411Mania	N/A	3/10

The PC version received "mixed or average" reviews, while the Xbox 360 version received "generally unfavorable reviews", according to the review aggregation website Metacritic. Many reviewers, including Francis Clarke of ApertureGames, expressed disappointment that the majority of the levels are played out primarily in two time periods. However, PC Gamer UK said that "Darkest of Days is a unique first person shooter". Positive reviews also came for the Xbox 360; GameShark commented that "technicalities take a pretty good game and drag it down into the realm of mediocrity. Still, automatic weapons during a Civil War battle...it's hard to pass that up."
