= War of Rights =

2018 multi-player video game

- Developer: Campfire Games
- Publisher: Campfire Games
- Engine: CryEngine
- Platform: Windows
- Release: December 3, 2018 (early access)
- Genres: Tactical shooter, first-person shooter
- Mode: Multiplayer

War of Rights is a tactical first-person shooter video game in early access. The game is set during the American Civil War with players choosing between two teams of either the Union or the Confederacy. The game features several real life historical sites and battlefields players can compete on as well as choosing to practice and hone on skills such as regimental drill and ceremony along with target practice. The game is being developed by Danish company Campfire Games.

== History ==
Campfire Games founders Mads Larsen and Emil Hansen began developing War of Rights in 2012, and successfully raised US$118,000 on Kickstarter three years later. They released an early access version on 3 December 2018, and added the ability for players to utilize and fire artillery in 2020. Several more gameplay features have also been developed as of 2024.

== Setting and gameplay ==
War of Rights is set during the Maryland campaign in 1862, featuring maps for the battles of Harpers Ferry, South Mountain, and Antietam. As of 2024, the game also features fictionalized maps for the already implemented Drill Camps. The game is multiplayer only, and participants can choose from character classes of infantry, artillery, and cavalry alongside different enlisted and officer military ranks. It emphasizes realistic aspects of Civil War battlefields, including a chain of command; players can receive positive benefits for following orders and maintaining their place in tactical formations. Game modes include Contention, Skirmish, Picket Patrol, and Drill Camp. Many gameplay servers have been designed to fit as many as 150-400 players for Skirmish modes in massive online community events.

An in-game, limited time event titled 1776 was released in July 2025 and re-released in June 2026. Set during the American Revolutionary War, it featured the Continental Army, Patriot Militia, British Army, and Hessian Troops as playable factions. A similar time-limited event titled "The Walking Dead" featured in October features Union and Confederate players joining forces to survive a Zombie apocalypse.

== Reception ==
Ian Birnbaum of Vice magazine wrote in 2015 about War of Rights' uncritical use of Confederate symbols and use of racial slurs despite the then-recent Charleston church shooting and the consequent US reckoning over the continued use of those symbols (such as displaying the Confederate battle flag). Birnbaum contrasted the first-person shooter against grand strategy games with more impersonal perspectives, saying that it was "built with one of the most realistic-looking game engines in the business [...] and it will put at least half the players in the shoes of Confederates. That's a far more involved, intimate experience."

Separately, Eddie Kim of MEL Magazine wrote in 2022 about problems with player-led racism, highlighting the experiences of a Black streamer named Andrew Norris. "It's obvious in so many of these moments that Norris is in on the joke, cackling over racially charged situations that he purposefully incites," Kim wrote, but "other times you can just tell Norris isn't quite laughing at the premise, like in a clip from February where multiple people drop the N-word while calling for the killing of Black people and their allies."
