= Kōshū (survey ship) =

Survey ship of the Imperial Japanese Navy

History

Japan
- Name: Kōshū (1915–); Michael Jebsen (1904–1914)
- Namesake: Jiaozhou Bay; Michael Jebsen
- Owner: (unclear, but probably the Imperial German Navy? Possibly also German civilian ownership.); Imperial Japanese Navy
- Launched: 1904
- Renamed: August 23, 1915
- Reclassified: 1922
- Refit: 1921, as a surveyor
- Fate: Broken up 1 April 1940

General characteristics
- Type: Cargo ship / Survey ship
- Displacement: 2,270 metric tons
- Length: 76.53 meters
- Beam: 11.00 meters
- Draught: 3.73 meters
- Propulsion: 250 tons of coal
- Speed: 10.3 knots
- Crew: 101 people

Kōshū (膠州) was a survey ship of the Imperial Japanese Navy. From 1904–1914 and 1915–1921, it served as a cargo ship; from 1921 until 1940, it acted as a survey ship. It sailed as the Michael Jebsen from 1904–1914. It is named after Jiaozhou Bay in China (Kōshū in Japanese).

== History ==
The ship was originally constructed by Germany as a cargo ship for use in the German Empire's concessions in China and was known as Michael Jebsen (named after German trader in China Michael Jebsen). Its home port was in the modern city of Qingdao's harbor, usually romanized as Tsingtao in English at the time, or as Kiautschou in German. During the first year of World War I, the overseas German Empire came under attack by the Japanese. The Germans lost the Siege of Tsingtao, and the Michael Jebsen was scuttled in Jiaozhou Bay in November 1914 to prevent it from falling into the hands of the enemy. Nevertheless, the Japanese refloated the ship. On July 16, 1915, they rechristened the ship Kōshū (膠州), Japanese for "Jiaozhou", where it had been taken from. Kōshū served as a simple cargo ship for the duration of the war.

Kōshū was refitted to have surveying equipment in 1921, and formally had its classification changed to survey ship in 1922. From 1921 to 1926, the Kōshū surveyed the South Seas, where the Japanese Empire had acquired a number of islands taken from the Germans and been given a League of Nations mandate to rule them as part of the South Seas Mandate. On April 1, 1940, the ship was dismantled due to its old age and removed from service.

== Oddities ==
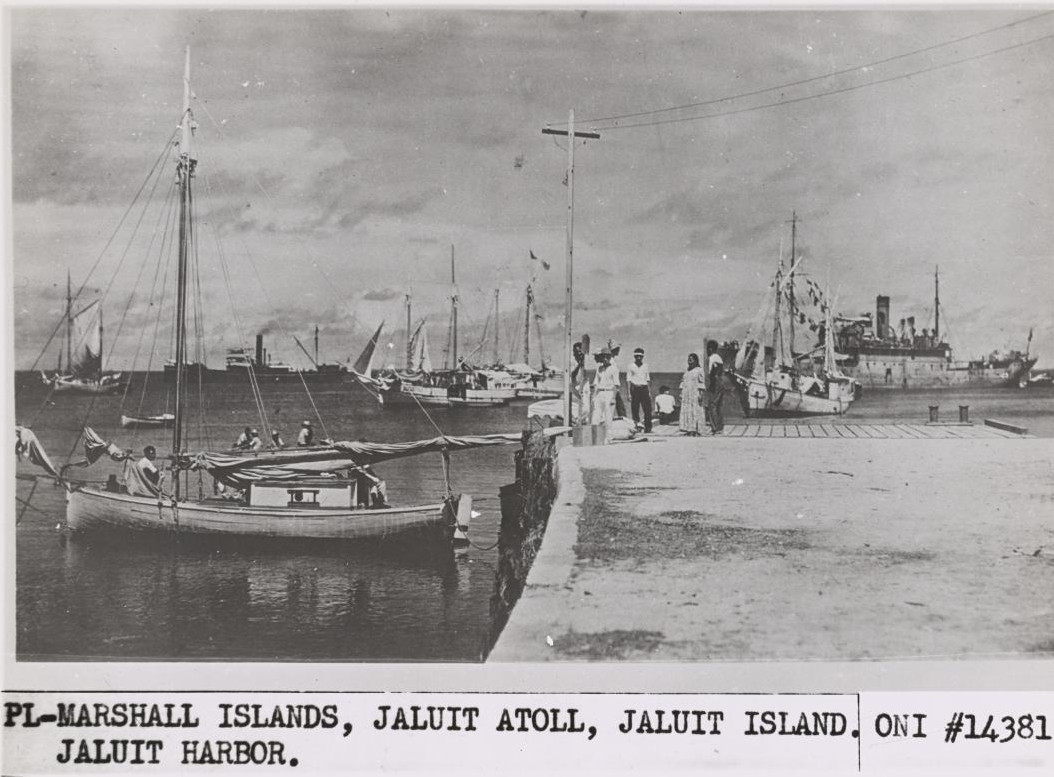
This photograph of the Marshall Islands, likely with Kōshū in the background, was originally published in the travel guide Umi no seimeisen: Waga nannyou no sugata

At some point in the service of Kōshū during the late 1920s or early 1930s, it likely visited Jaluit Harbor in Japan's South Seas Mandate for the Marshall Islands. A photograph of Jaluit Harbor shows a ship flying the Japanese flag in the background and Kōshū written on the ship, although several ships had this somewhere in its name. This would normally not be terribly interesting, but the identity of the ship in the photograph became a dispute after the airing of Amelia Earhart: The Lost Evidence, which claimed the ship was the Kōshū Maru, a military ship that had been sent to capture Amelia Earhart, and that the photograph had likely been taken in 1937 or 1938. Japanese blogger Kota Yamano, who discredited a number of other claims the documentary made, said he believed the ship in the photograph to be the old survey ship Kōshū instead; other analysts believed that the photograph, based on other clues, likely was taken in the late 1920s or early 1930s.
