= TIGHAR =

Research and recovery group for historical aircraft

The International Group for Historic Aircraft Recovery
- Abbreviation: TIGHAR
- Formation: 1985
- Type: Nonprofit
- Headquarters: Pennsylvania, United States
- Location: United States
- Key people: Ric Gillespie (executive director)

The International Group for Historic Aircraft Recovery (Tighar) is an American non-profit organization based in Pennsylvania. It was founded by Richard Gillespie in 1985. According to Tighar's federal tax exemption form 990 for non-profits, the organization's mission is to "promote responsible aviation archaeological and historic preservation".

== Work ==
=== Amelia Earhart and Fred Noonan ===
Tighar has long been involved with the search for Amelia Earhart and Fred Noonan and advocates the theory that Earhart and Noonan landed on Gardner Island, now known as Nikumaroro.

In 2012 Tighar was searching for clues around the Kiribati Islands using sonar equipment with the help of the State Department and undersea explorer Robert Ballard.

Ballard led a 2019 expedition to locate Earhart's Lockheed Model 10 Electra or evidence that it landed on Nikumaroro as supposed by the Gardner/Nikumaroro hypothesis. After days of searching the deep cliffs supporting the island and the nearby ocean using state of the art equipment and technology, Ballard did not find any evidence of the plane or any associated wreckage of it. Allison Fundis, Ballard's chief operating officer of the expedition, stated, “We felt like if her plane was there, we would have found it pretty early in the expedition.” Although Ballard maintains that the plane or significant portions still exist and will eventually be found, Tighar argues that the Electra has been "broken up" by the surf and other harsh environmental elements.

Former Tighar member Martin "Monty" Fowler writing a blog post in 2025 wrote criticisms of Tighar's methods stating that Tighar was a "a closed circle of true believers makes the facts subservient to the forgone conclusion", and that often contradictory revelations were not followed up upon, a form of confirmation bias. Fowler also stated that an aircraft fragment purported to be from Earhart's plane, did not appear to be from a pre-World War 2 plane like Earhart's, as it lacked 1930s era pre-war paint residue common on pre-war models. He also states the results of a metallurgical analysis of the fragment were not followed up. Fowler states this is significant as pre-WW2 and WW2 aluminium used in the construction of the planes was significantly different.

On August 20, 2024, United States publication Popular Mechanics wrote a piece on Tighar and Gillespie, reporting on critics Mike Campbell and Fred Goerner, who believed it had been conclusively proven that the Japanese had captured Earhart, and who referred to Tighar's Nikumaroro hypothesis as a "Nikumaroro virus". Goerner claimed the he had been told directly by commander in chief of the US Pacific Fleet in World War 2, Chester W. Nimitz that Earhart had been captured by the Japanese after landing on the Mili Atoll.The Japanese capture theory has been generally disregarded as being implausible based on several factors.

The article also places some scrutiny on Gillespie and Tighar's claims to have found parts of Earhart's plane and her personal effects such as shoes and hair products, since it had been occupied by dozens of people from 1939 to 1963, although the article was generally sympathetic to Gillespie's efforts to solve the mystery.

=== Glenn Miller ===
In January 2019, it was reported that Tighar would investigate Glenn Miller's disappearance. Per a BBC report, Tighar's interest in Glenn Miller was inspired by a fisherman's claims that he caught a plane wreck in his nets, then released it. Although Tighar has failed to independently corroborate the claims to date, and have not seen or verified the wreck, they maintain that there is a possibility that the reported debris could be associated with Glenn Miller. "These things often start with stories", said Tighar executive director Ric Gillespie.
