= List of Guano Island claims =

Islands claimed by the US under the 1856 Guano Islands Act

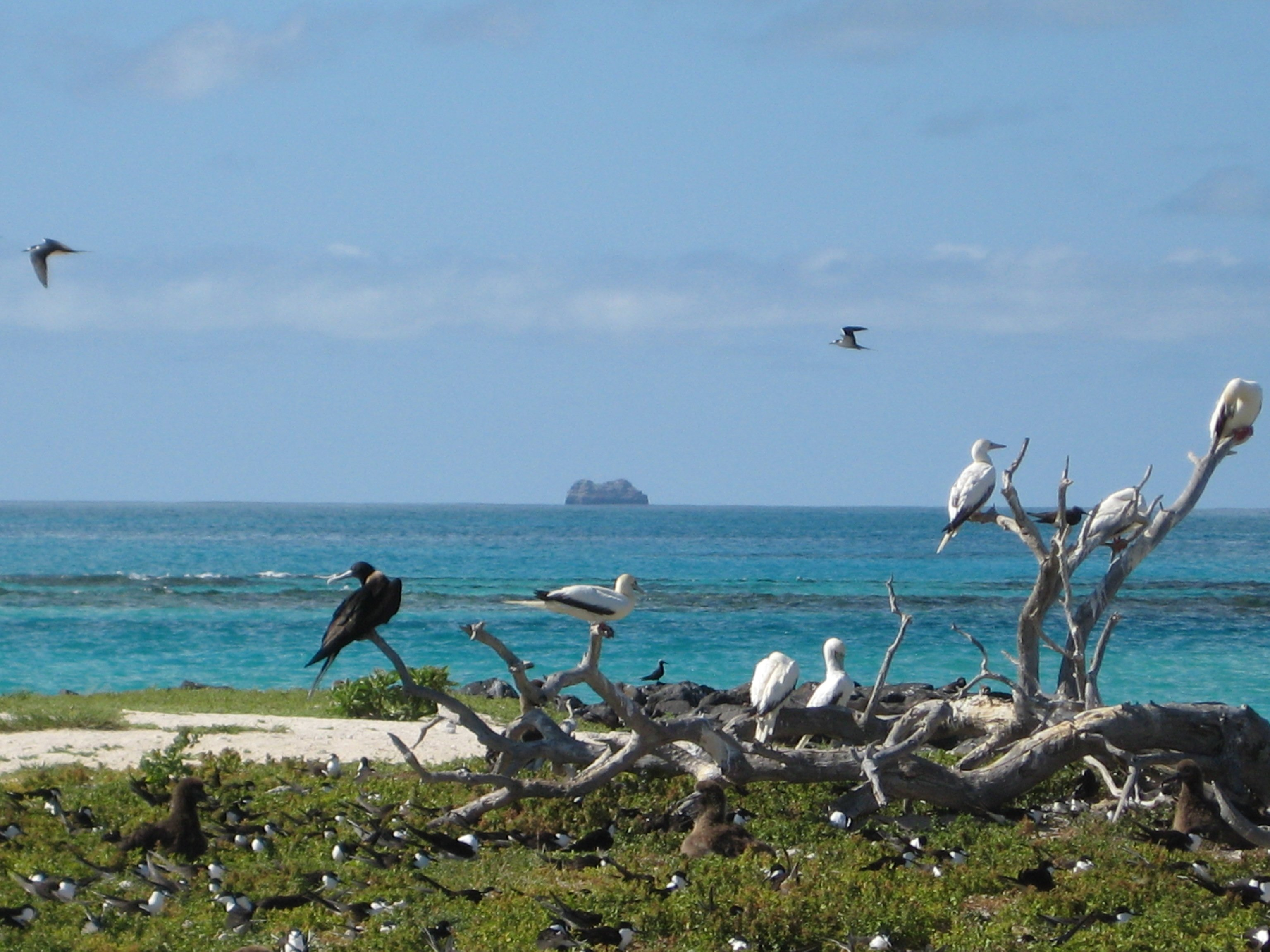
Tern island and La Perouse Pinnacle of the French Frigate Shoals

A number of islands were claimed as insular areas on behalf of the United States under the Guano Islands Act of 1856. These claims were made by private individuals to the U.S. Department of State and were not accepted by the United States unless certain conditions were met. The islands had to be unoccupied and outside the jurisdiction of another government; the claims also had to be bonded before the U.S. government would consider them insular areas of the country. As of 2023, only the eight islands administered as the U.S. Minor Outlying Islands and the ones now part of Hawaii and American Samoa remain under the jurisdiction of the United States. Any other unresolved claims, if they exist, are dormant, and have not been contested by the United States in many years with the exception of Navassa.

== Table ==
Island	Region	Alternate name	Coordinates	Current status	Resolution of U.S. claim
Alto Velo Island	Caribbean	Alta Vela Island	17°28′42″N 71°38′05″W	Dominican Republic	Claim rejected with U.S. acknowledging Dominican claims. See Alto Velo Claim.
Atafu	Oceania	Duke of York Group	8°33′06″S 172°30′03″W	Tokelau	Claim bonded in 1860, but was never acted upon. Britain claimed in 1899. Final renouncement of any U.S. claim with Treaty of Tokehega
Ashmore Reef	Indian Ocean	Caller Group	12°15′30″S 123°02′30″E	Australian Territory	Claimed in 1878 but never bonded, British sovereignty acknowledged.
Bajo Nuevo Bank	Caribbean	Petrel Islands	15°53′N 78°38′W	Colombia; (Disputed)	Remains in place as an unincorporated territory. De facto administered by Colombia, and also claimed by Jamaica and Nicaragua.
Baker Island	Oceania	New Nantucket	0°11′41″N 176°28′46″W	US Minor Islands	Unincorporated territory
Birnie Island	Oceania		3°35′S 171°33′W	Kiribati	Treaty of Tarawa
Butaritari	Oceania	Makin Atoll, Makin Island, Touching Island	3°10′04″N 172°49′33″E	Kiribati	Treaty of Tarawa
Caroline Island	Oceania	Millennium Island	9°56′13″S 150°12′42″W	Kiribati	Treaty of Tarawa
Carondelet Reef	Oceania		5°34′S 173°51′W	Kiribati	Treaty of Tarawa
Clipperton Island	Pacific Ocean	Passion Island	10°18′N 109°13′W	France	U.S. claim never bonded with the U.S. acknowledging France's claim. French and Mexican dispute settled via arbitration in France's favor by King Victor Emmanuel III of Italy in 1931. See Clipperton Island case.
Cayo Arenas	Gulf of Mexico	Arenas Key; Arenas Island	22°07′N 91°24′W	Mexico	Bond filed and approved in 1881; US claim renounced in 1894.
Ducie Island	Oceania		24°40′09″S 124°47′11″W	British Territory	Never bonded. Administered by Pitcairn Islands.
Enderbury Island	Oceania	Guano Island	3°08′S 171°05′W	Kiribati	Treaty of Tarawa
Fakaofo	Oceania	Bowditch Island	9°21′55″S 171°12′54″W	Tokelau	No formal claim filed; however, any U.S. claim renounced in Treaty of Tokehega
Flint Island	Oceania		11°25′48″S 151°49′9″W	Kiribati	Treaty of Tarawa
French Frigate Shoals	Oceania	Kānemilohaʻi	23°44′56″N 166°8′46″W	Hawaii	Assumed sole competing claim through annexation of Hawaii (1898); included in State of Hawaii (1959).
Funafuti	Oceania	Ellice's Group	8°31′S 179°13′E	Tuvalu	Tuvalu–US Treaty of 1983
Howland Island	Oceania	Worth Island	0°48′07″N 176°38′3″W	US Minor Islands	Unincorporated territory
Isla de Aves	Caribbean	Isla de Aves	15°40′18″N 63°36′59″W	Venezuela	United States–Venezuela Maritime Boundary Treaty
Îles du Connétable	Atlantic Ocean	Constable Islands	4°49′25″N 51°56′11″W	France	Rescinded. Administered by French Guiana.
Jarvis Island	Oceania	Bunker Island	0°22′S 160°01′W	US Minor Islands	Unincorporated territory
Johnston Atoll	Oceania		16°44′13″N 169°31′26″W	US Minor Islands	Unincorporated territory
Kanton Island	Oceania	Canton Island	2°50′S 171°40′W	Kiribati	Treaty of Tarawa
Kingman Reef	Oceania	Danger Rock	6°24′N 162°24′W	US Minor Islands	Unincorporated territory
Kiritimati	Oceania	Christmas Island	1°52′N 157°24′W	Kiribati	Treaty of Tarawa
Lacepede Islands	Oceania	Lacapade [sic] Islands	16°51′55″S 122°08′12″E	Australia	Claim made on 26 June 1876; repudiated by US government in 1877.
Makin (atoll)	Oceania	Little Makin	3°23′00″N 173°00′00″E	Kiribati	Treaty of Tarawa
Malden Island	Oceania	Independence Island	4°01′S 154°56′W	Kiribati	Treaty of Tarawa
Manihiki	Oceania	Island of Pearls	10°24′S 161°00′W	Cook Islands	Cook Islands–United States Maritime Boundary Treaty
Manra	Oceania	Sydney Island	4°27′S 171°16′W	Kiribati	Treaty of Tarawa
McKean Island	Oceania	Wigram Island	3°35′S 174°02′W	Kiribati	Treaty of Tarawa
Midway Atoll	Oceania	Middlebrook Islands	28°12′N 177°21′W	US Minor Islands	Unincorporated territory
Minami-Tori-shima	Oceania	Marcus Island	24°18′N 153°58′E	Japan	Returned to Japan in 1968 after it had been given to US by Treaty of San Francisco
Nassau (Cook Islands)	Oceania	Te Nuku-o-Ngalewu	11°34′4″S 165°24′25″W	Cook Islands	Sold to Cook Islands in 1945 by the Samoa Shipping and Trading Company.
Navassa Island	Caribbean	Navaza	18°24′10″N 75°0′45″W	US Minor Islands; (Disputed)	Administered by the United States as an unincorporated territory and one of the US Minor Islands. Also claimed by Haiti.
Nikumaroro	Oceania	Gardner Island	4°40′S 174°31′W	Kiribati	Treaty of Tarawa
Niulakita	Oceania	Sophia Island, Rocky Island, Nurakita	10°45′S 179°30′E	Tuvalu	Tuvalu–US Treaty of 1983
Nukufetau	Oceania	De Peyster's Group	8°00′S 178°30′E	Tuvalu	Tuvalu–US Treaty of 1983
Nukulaelae	Oceania	Mitchell's Group	9°22′52″S 179°51′08″E	Tuvalu	Tuvalu–US Treaty of 1983
Nukunonu	Oceania	Duke of Clarence Island	9°10′06″S 171°48′35″W	Tokelau	Claim bonded in 1860, but was never acted upon. Britain claimed in 1899. Final renouncement of any U.S. claim with Treaty of Tokehega
Orona	Oceania	Hull Island	4°30′S 172°10′W	Kiribati	Treaty of Tarawa
Palmyra Atoll	Oceania		5°53′N 162°5′W	US Minor Islands	Incorporated territory. U.S. assumed sole competing claim through annexation of Hawaii (1898), but not included in State of Hawaii (1959).
Penrhyn Island	Oceania	Tongareva	9°00′20″S 157°58′10″W	Cook Islands	Cook Islands–United States Maritime Boundary Treaty
Providence Island	Indian Ocean		9°13′7″S 51°1′47″E	Seychelles	Claim never bonded. Administered by Seychelles.
Pukapuka	Oceania	San Bernardo Island, Danger Island	10°53′S 165°40′W	Cook Islands	Cook Islands–United States Maritime Boundary Treaty
Quita Sueño Bank	Caribbean	Quitasueño	14°19′N 81°10′W	Colombia	Vásquez-Saccio Treaty of 1972
Rakahanga	Oceania	Grand Duke Alexander Island	10°02′S 161°05′W	Cook Islands	Cook Islands–United States Maritime Boundary Treaty
Rawaki Island	Oceania	Phoenix Island	3°42′40″S 170°42′43″W	Kiribati	Treaty of Tarawa
Roncador Bank	Caribbean		13°34′N 80°05′W	Colombia	Vásquez-Saccio Treaty of 1972
Scorpion Reef	Gulf of Mexico	Arrecife Alacranes (Isla Pérez, Isla Chica, Isla Pájaros)	22°24′N 89°42′W	Mexico	The islets of Pájaros, Pérez, and Chica were bonded in 1884. In response to a protest by Mexico, the U.S. claims were abandoned in 1894.
Serrana Bank	Caribbean		14°20′N 80°20′W	Colombia	Vásquez-Saccio Treaty of 1972
Serranilla Bank	Caribbean		15°50′N 79°50′W	Colombia–Jamaica; (Disputed)	Remains in place as an unincorporated territory. Colombia and Jamaica agreed to a condominium of Serranilla's exclusive economic zone; Nicaragua also lays claim.
Starbuck Island	Oceania	Volunteer Island	5°37′S 155°56′W	Kiribati	Treaty of Tarawa
Swains Island	Oceania	Olohega, Olosega, Quirós, Isla de la Gente Hermosa, Jennings Island	11°03′20″S 171°04′40″W	American Samoa; (Disputed)	Occupied by an American since 1856. Bonded under the Guano Islands Act in 1860. Acknowledged as U.S. territory by Britain in 1910. In 1925 was incorporated into the territory of American Samoa. U.S. claim recognized by New Zealand in Treaty of Tokehega, but later disputed by Tokelau.
Swan Islands	Caribbean	Islas Santanilla	17°24′38″N 83°55′19″W	Honduras	Honduras–US Treaty of 1972
Tabuaeran	Oceania	Fanning Island	3°51′36″N 159°21′52″W	Kiribati	Treaty of Tarawa
Teraina	Oceania	Washington Island	4°41′00″N 160°22′40″W	Kiribati	Treaty of Tarawa
Vostok Island	Oceania	Staver Island	10°06′S 152°23′W	Kiribati	Treaty of Tarawa
Winslow Reef	Oceania		1°36′S 174°57′W	Kiribati	Treaty of Tarawa

== Images ==
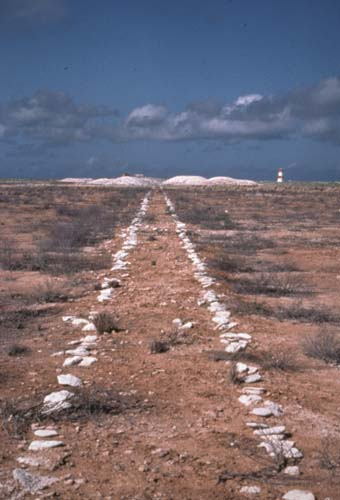
Guano tramway on Jarvis Island

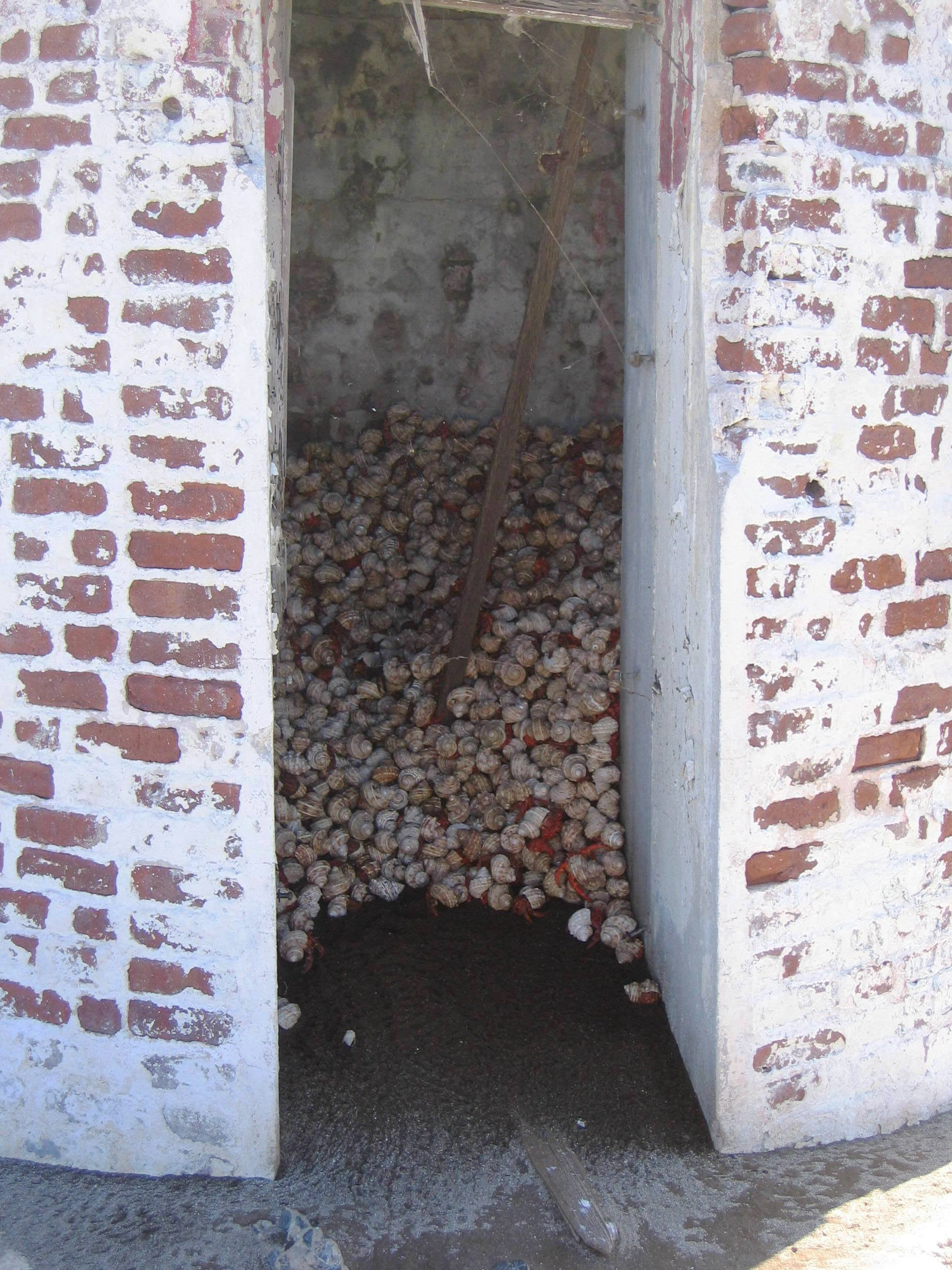
Hermit crabs on Baker Island

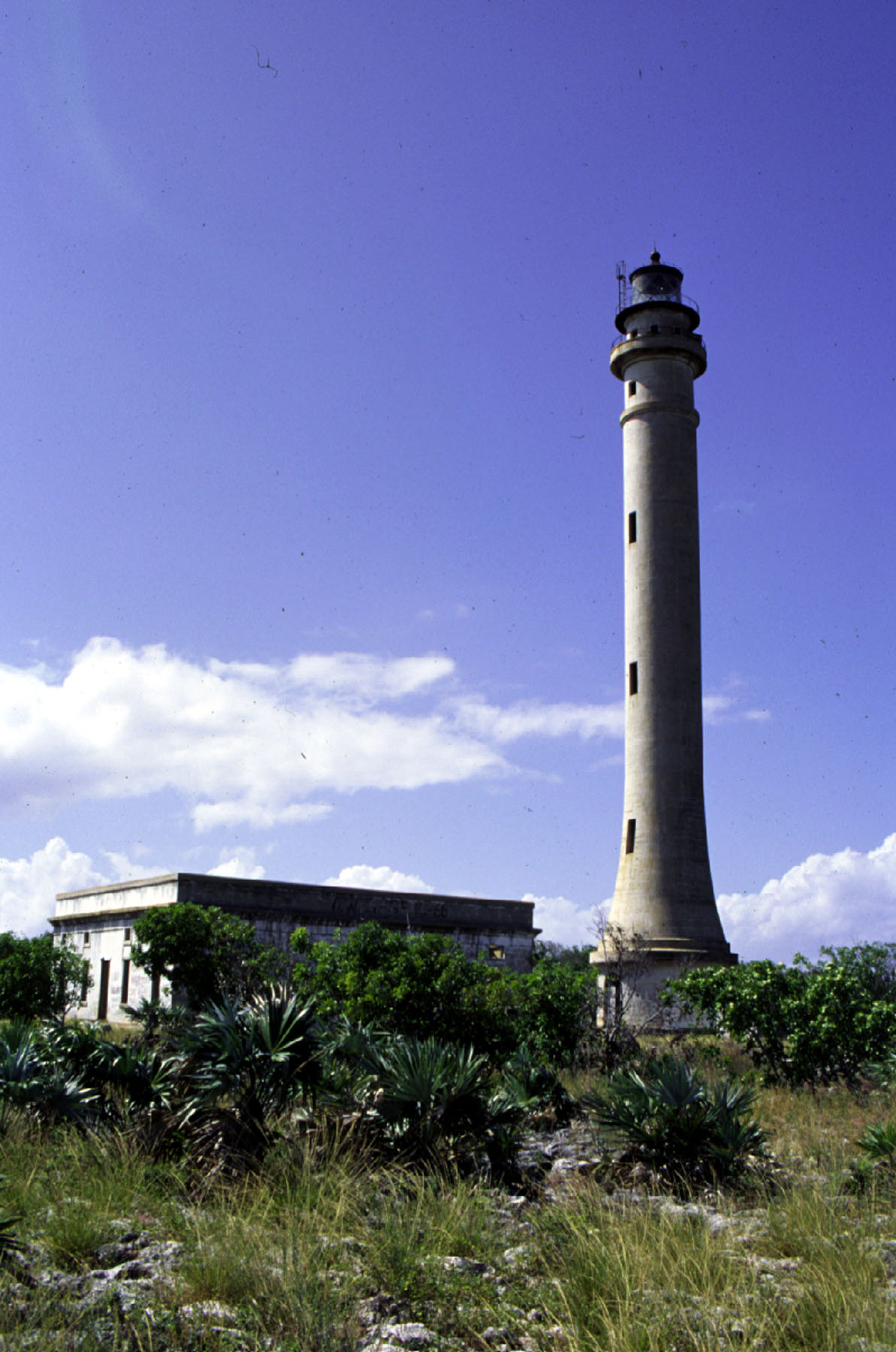
Navassa Island Lighthouse

== See also ==
- Guano
- Territories of the United States
- Pacific Islands Heritage Marine National Monument
