= Canton Island =

Atoll in the South Pacific Ocean

Native name: Kanton or Abariringa
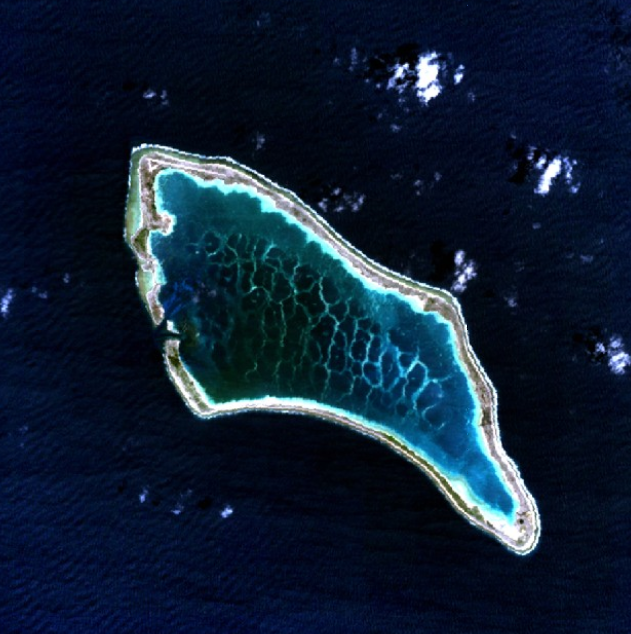
- Canton Island, visible color satellite image

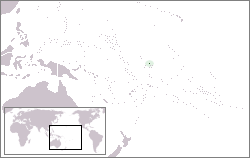
- Canton Island location map

- Location in Kiribati Location in Oceania Location in the Pacific

Geography
- Location: Pacific Ocean
- Coordinates: 02°48′38″S 171°40′32″W
- Area: 9.2 km^{2} (3.6 sq mi)
- Kiribati
- Administrative division: Kanton
- Largest Island settlement: Tebaronga (pop. 20)

Canton Island (also known as Kanton or Abariringa), previously known as Mary Island, Mary Balcout's Island or Swallow Island, is the largest, northernmost, and as of 2020, the sole inhabited island of the Phoenix Islands, in the Republic of Kiribati. It is an atoll located in the South Pacific Ocean roughly halfway between Hawaii and Fiji, a location that once made it advantageous as an airline stop. The island is a narrow ribbon of land around a lagoon; an area of 40 km^{2} (15 sq mi). Canton's closest neighbour is the uninhabited Enderbury Island, 63 km (39 mi) west-southwest. The capital of Kiribati, South Tarawa, lies 1,765 km (1,097 mi) to the west. As of 2020, the population was 41, down from 61 in 2000. The island's sole village, Tebaronga, is located on the northwest point, below the airstrip.

Kiribati declared the Phoenix Islands Protected Area in 2006, with the park being expanded in 2008. The 425,300 km^{2} (164,200 sq mi) marine reserve contains eight coral atolls, including Canton. Because it is inhabited, management of Canton Island is described in the Canton Resource Use Sustainability Plan (KRUSP), which covers a 12 nmi (22 km; 14 mi) radius around the atoll. Over 50% of the island and lagoon are protected in a conservation zone.

== Discovery and toponymy of Canton Island ==
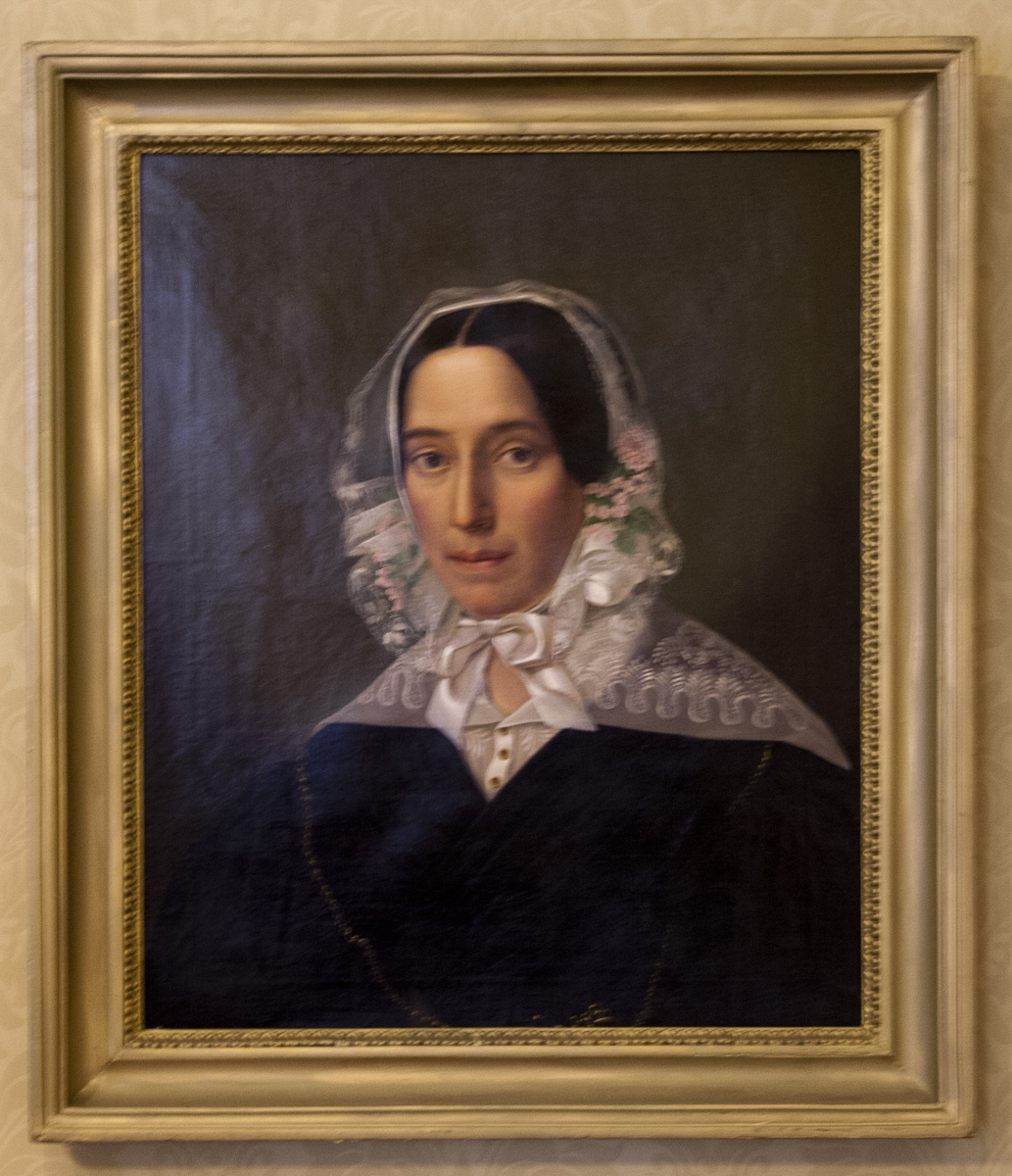
Mary (Hill) Boulcott (1786 - 1858)

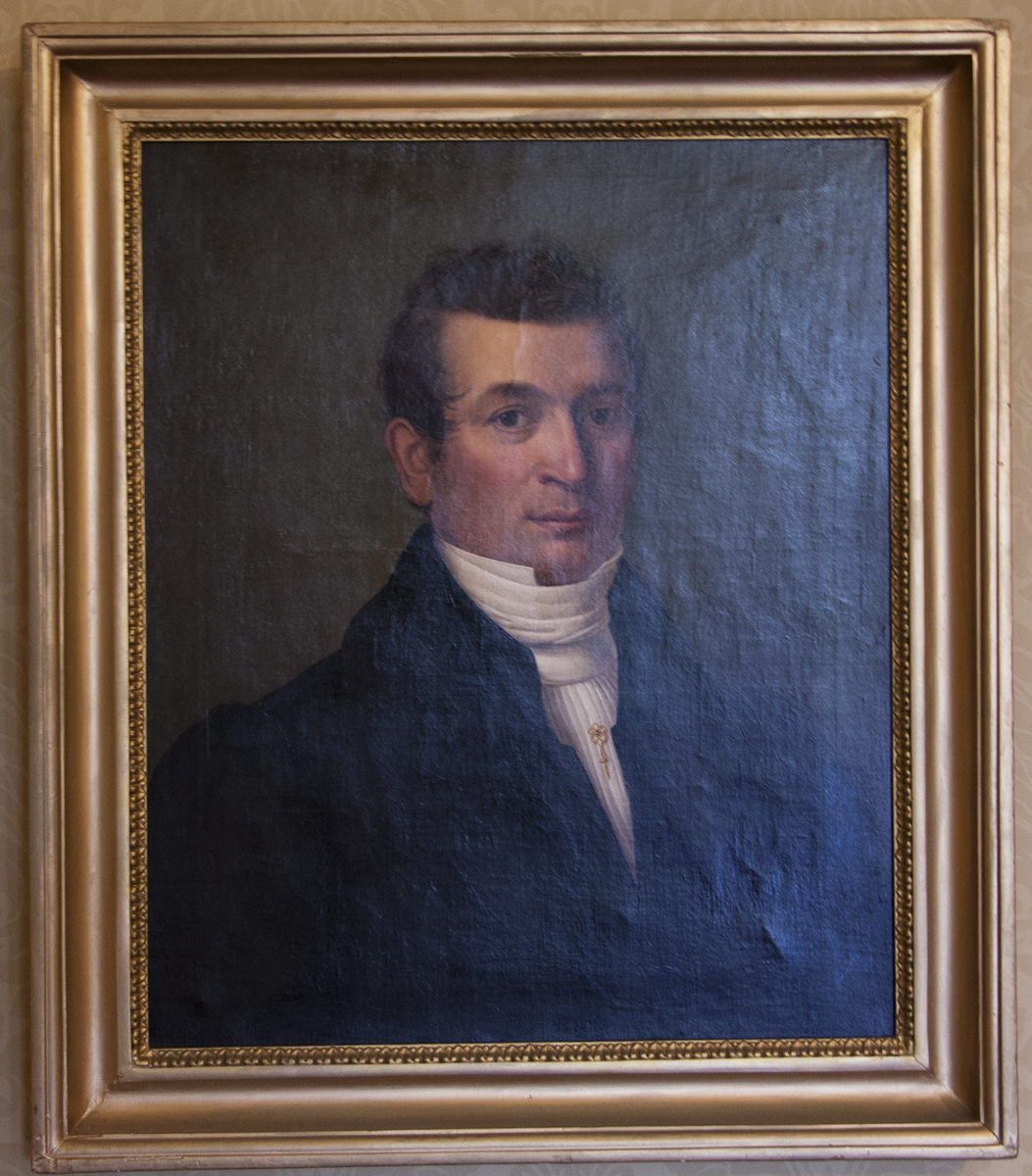
John E. Boulcott (1784 -1855)

On 5 August 1824, the whaler Phœnix of London (master John Palmer) in the company of whaler Mary of London, came to a low and barren island with a spacious lagoon, in latitude 2° 48ʹ S and longitude 172° 10ʹ W, and it was named "Mary Ballcotts Island". H.E. Maude and Niel Gunson both assumed this to be the whaler Mary, owned by John Lydekker (1778–1832), and that her captain Edward Reed Lacy had reported the island. The entry for 5 August 1824 of that Mary's logbook, however, mentions no discovery, nor a ship Phœnix. The ship Mary truly there that day (her master presumably Abijah Lock) was another whaler from London, owned by Hill, Boulcott & Hill, a firm consisting of the two brothers James & Amon Hill and their brother-in-law John Ellerker Boulcott. The latter was married to a Mary Boulcott, née Hill, and it was she for whom this island was named. Ever since it was incorrectly penned down as "Mary Ballcotts Island" in William Dalton's journal, it has appeared with deviated spelling in books and on charts as Mary-Bulrock, Mary Balcout, Marie Ballcout, etc.

Modern Canton derives its name from the New Bedford whaler Canton, which was wrecked on its outer shore in early March 1854. Captain Andrew Johnson Wing (1820–1897) and his full crew managed to save not only themselves but also four small whaleboats and scanty provisions. In late March, the 31 men tried their luck by putting to sea in the four open boats and made their way northwest for 49 days straight when finally they reached safety in Guam, 2,900 nautical miles from where they had started. Kanton is spelled with a K in the Gilbertese language, which has no letter C. The two versions of the name exist in the Constitution of 1979.

== Geography, flora and fauna ==
=== Canton's flora and fauna ===
Canton has been described as being shaped like a large pork chop. From its northwest to southeast points is a distance of 14.5 km (9.0 mi), while the land rim varies in width from 50–600 m (160–2,000 ft) and 1.5–7 m (5–25 ft) in elevation. The southeast corner of the island is known as "Pyramid Point." The sole entrances to the lagoon are on the west side, with the main channel exhibiting currents of 6–8 knots (3–4 m/s). The lagoon itself is filled with marine life, holding 153 different species of fish, including tuna, sharks, stingrays and eels. An unpaved road runs around the island, though its current state of repair is uncertain. Canton Island Airport (IATA: CIS, ICAO: PCIS) lies at the northwest corner of the island, but it currently lacks any commercial scheduled service. The World Port Index number of Canton Island is 56025.

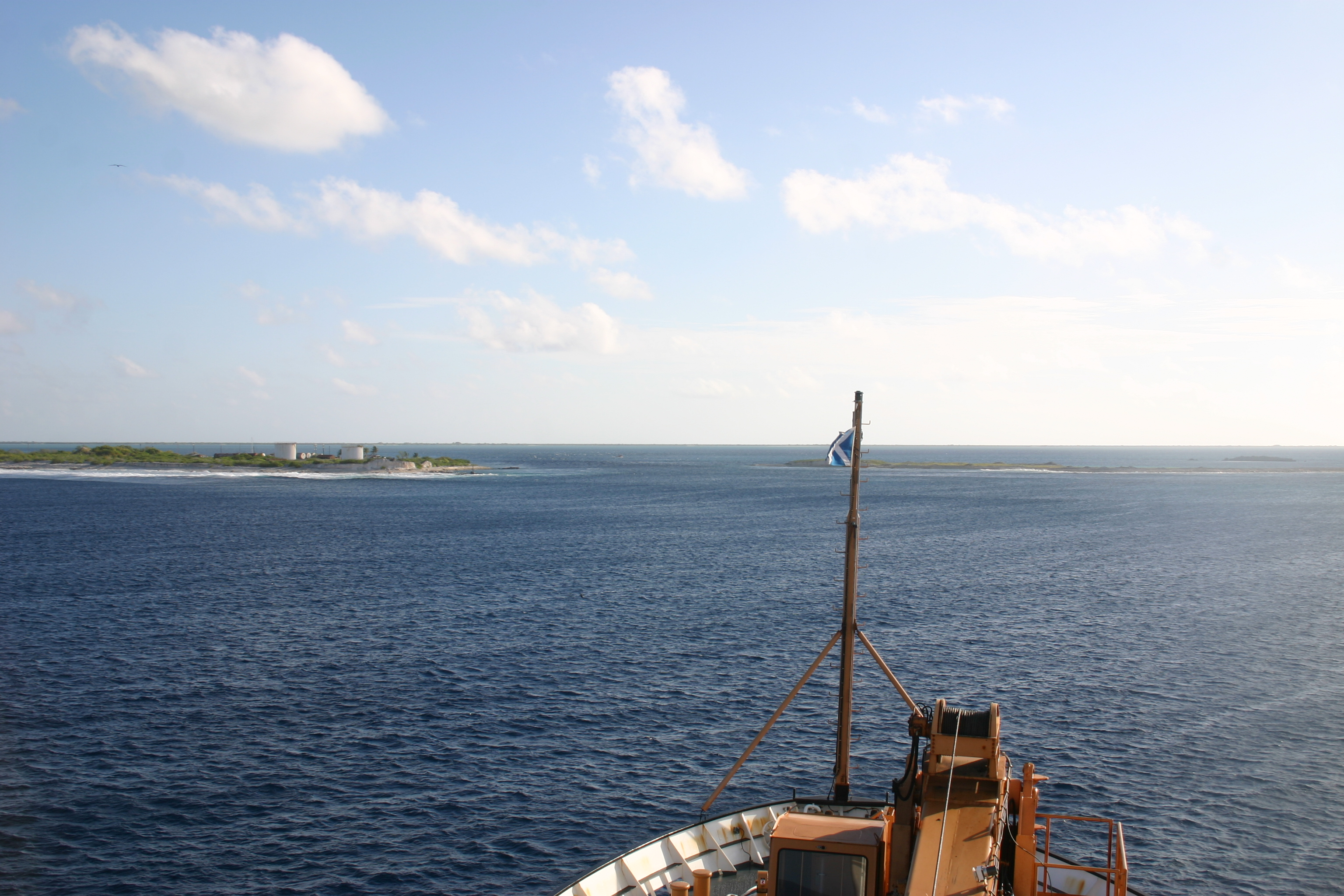
Entrance to Kanton Island's lagoon. Village site is to the left.

Much of Canton's land surface is bare coral, sparsely covered with herbs and low bunch grass; trees and bushes are found near the village site. According to Edwin H. Bryan's American Polynesia and the Hawaiian Chain, Canton possessed in 1941 a total of twelve native species of vegetation, including low herbs and bunch grass, a thick stand of Scaevola shrubs on the island's south side (2–3 m or 6.6–9.8 ft high), some Suriana maritima shrubs near the lagoon entrance, heliotrope (Heliotropium foertherianum) and kou (Cordia subcordata) trees, and coconut palms. Geoffrey Buddle of the New Zealand solar eclipse expedition of 1937 reported 23 bird species on Canton, together with Polynesian rats, lizards, hermit crabs and turtles. Two species of spiders were found on the island.

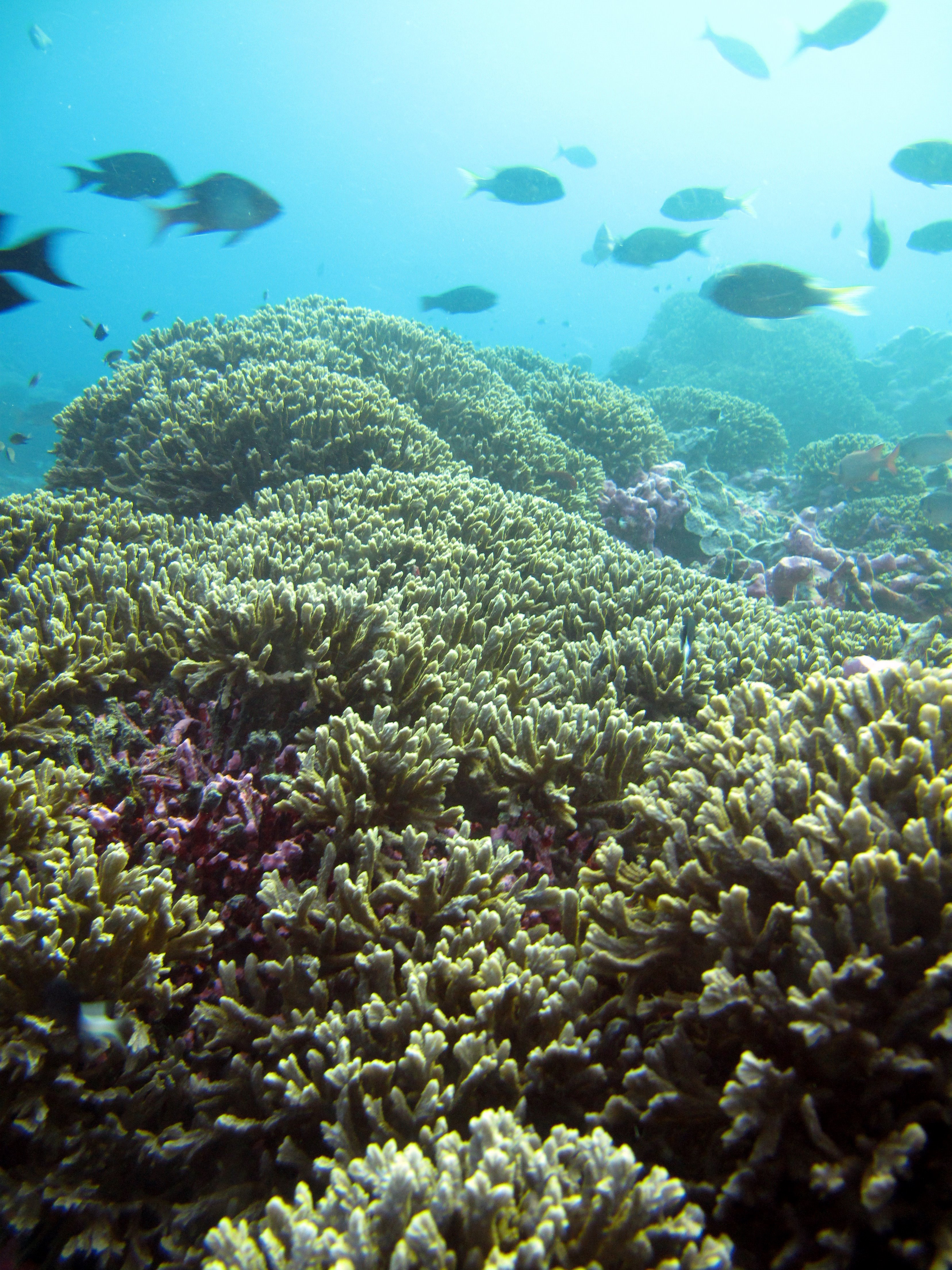
Hydnophora rigida corals on Kanton, part of the Phoenix Islands Protected Area

There is no fresh water on Canton except for rainwater caught in cisterns; Pan American World Airways had a large distillation plant on the island when it operated there during the 1940s and 1950s. Rainfall is sparse, averaging 8.71–35.97 in (221–914 mm) between 1938 and 1953, though later reports suggest a wetter climate in recent years.

=== Canton's reefs ===
The 2000 surveys (Obura, et al.) identified that at the entrance to the lagoon very strong tidal flows pass through with extensive coral gardens extending for a radius of approximately two km (1.2 mi) from the channel. At about 4 km (2.5 mi) inside of the channel, the lagoon is crossed by four north–south reef ledges, which reduce water flow and suppress coral growth. The coral gardens zone contains Acropora tables and Acroporidae (staghorn corals), growing over a sandy bottom. Coral communities were more highly developed on the Kanton reefs than on other islands in the Phoenix Group. The high-end live coral cover (LCC) for some sites was greater than 50% and approaching 100% on some small patch reefs. The average conditions with 30-40% LCC, with a relatively high abundance of coral rubble, sand, with turf and fleshy algae. Coralline algae and Halimeda were less abundant than at Nikumaroro or McKean. The most abundant coral species at Kanton included: Acroporidae (staghorn corals), Acropora cytherea, Montipora efflorescens, Goniastrea stelligera, Echinopora lamellosa, Leptastrea purpurea, Pocillopora verrucosa, Millepora platyphylla, Pavona explanulata and Pavona varians.

== History ==
=== British claims ===
The British laid claim to Canton Island during the 1850s. The official British claim was formally reasserted on 6 August 1936, and an order in council issued in March 1937 including Canton and other Phoenix Islands in the Gilbert and Ellice Islands Colony, with the British making several visits to the island culminating in the placement of two radio operators on Canton on 31 August 1937.

=== Americans arrive ===
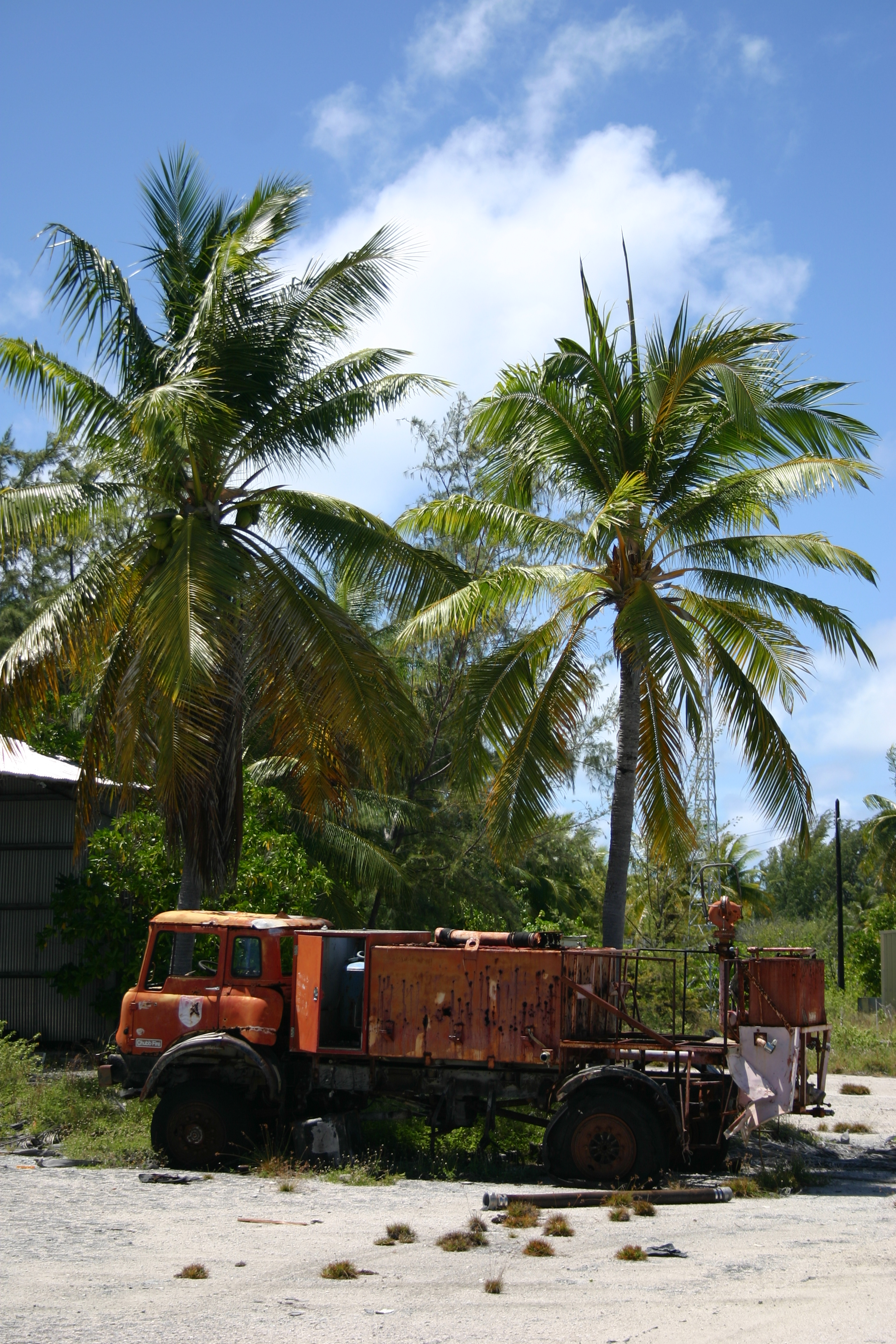
Rusting fire truck on Canton Island, 2008.

On 8 June 1937, Canton was the site of a total solar eclipse and the island was occupied briefly by American and New Zealand scientists, members of an expedition organized by the National Geographic Society, and led by the astronomer Samuel Alfred Mitchell. During this time, the American party claimed the island for the United States, erecting a small monument with two American flags. According to one account, the British warship HMS Wellington fired a shot across the bow of the USS Avocet, when the latter refused to cede the choicest anchorage spot to the British vessel. The American ship allegedly responded in kind, following which both captains agreed to "cease fire" until instructions could be received from their respective governments. Washington and London quickly ordered no further escalation, and both parties observed the solar eclipse together, "though officially a bit cool."

In response to the British reoccupation of Canton in August 1937, seven Americans from the American Equatorial Islands Colonization Project landed on the island on 7 March 1938. Although the British ambassador to the United States requested removal of markers claiming U.S. sovereignty, President Franklin Roosevelt had formally placed the island under control of the U.S. Interior department on 3 March 1938. Both parties continued to press their competing claims until 6 April 1939, when the U.S. and Britain agreed to hold Canton under joint control for the next fifty years as the Canton and Enderbury Islands condominium. The U.S./U.K. tenure proved cordial and cooperative thereafter, with each party enjoying the other's hospitality and working together to ensure smooth operation of island facilities. A United States office was open between 1940 and 1965 and from 1970. Canton Island Post Office opened on 25 January 1941 and closed around February 1968.

=== Airplane oasis ===
Pan American World Airways (Pan Am) arrived on Canton on 18 May 1939, to build facilities for their planned New Zealand flying boat service. Service commenced on 12 July 1940 with the Boeing 314 Clipper flying boat aircraft. On 4 December 1941, the Pacific Clipper departed Kanton for New Caledonia as the final civilian flight before the United States joined the war.

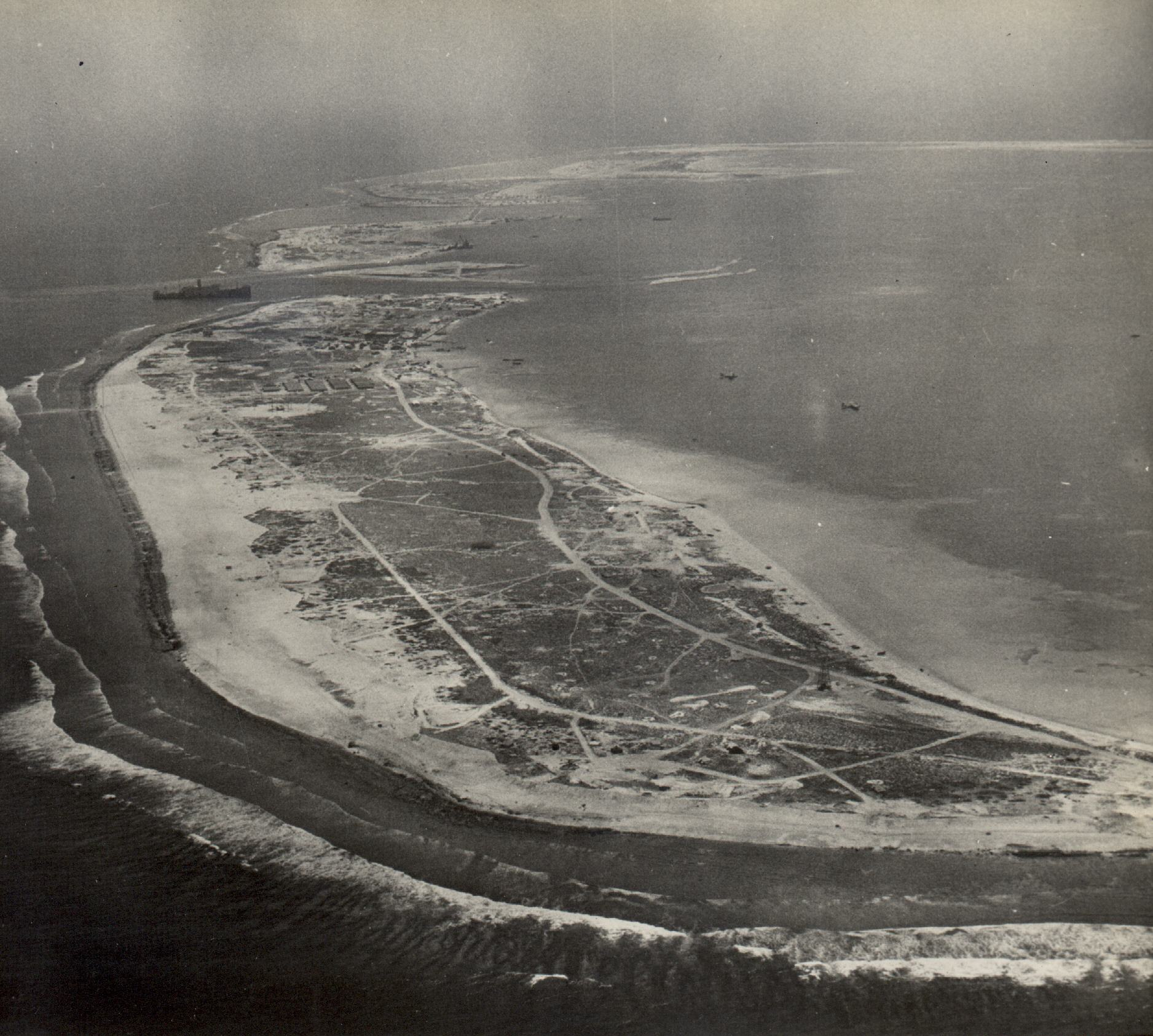
Aerial view of Canton Island showing SS President Taylor grounded in an entrance to the lagoon (1945)

=== World War II ===
During World War II the United States Navy built a 6,230-foot (1,900 m) airstrip at 2°46′05″S 171°42′37″W (now known as Canton Island Airport (IATA: CIS, ICAO: PCIS)). Kanton became a stopover point for the Navy Air Transport Service flights to Australia and New Zealand as well as a staging point for attacks on the Gilbert Islands, then held by Japan. The SS President Taylor was grounded and abandoned near the island on 14 February 1942 when disembarking troops. It was shelled three times in late 1942 by Japanese submarines, and bombed once on 25 March 1943. Damage was reported as "slight". The island was defended by approximately 1,200 combat troops and support personnel, but Japanese forces never attempted a landing. It was the site of at least two airplane crashes during the war: on 19 July 1944 and 5 December 1945. After the war moved west, it became the homebase for the Roman Catholic chaplain in this area of the Pacific.

=== Post War Administration and international airline service ===
In November 1946, Pan Am resumed service to Hawaii, Australia and New Zealand via Canton with Douglas DC-4 aircraft. British Commonwealth Pacific Airlines (BCPA), Australia's first trans-Pacific airline, served the island via a cooperative agreement with Australian National Airways (ANA) initially with Douglas DC-4s on a routing of Sydney - Auckland - Fiji - Canton Island - Honolulu - San Francisco - Vancouver, with the inaugural flight departing Australia on 15 September 1946. BCPA then began flying luxurious Douglas DC-6Bs on the Sydney to Vancouver route. Qantas took over this service shortly thereafter as BCPA subsequently ceased all operations and went out of business. Canadian Pacific Airlines also used the island as well for its Douglas DC-4 service between Vancouver and the southern hemisphere. A full-scale community was established to support these airline operations, including an electrical power station, a hotel for the airline passengers' use, a medical dispensary, school for dependent children of station personnel, and other necessary facilities. The island was jointly administered by the United Kingdom and the United States, and the British and American post offices were both operated from a single building.

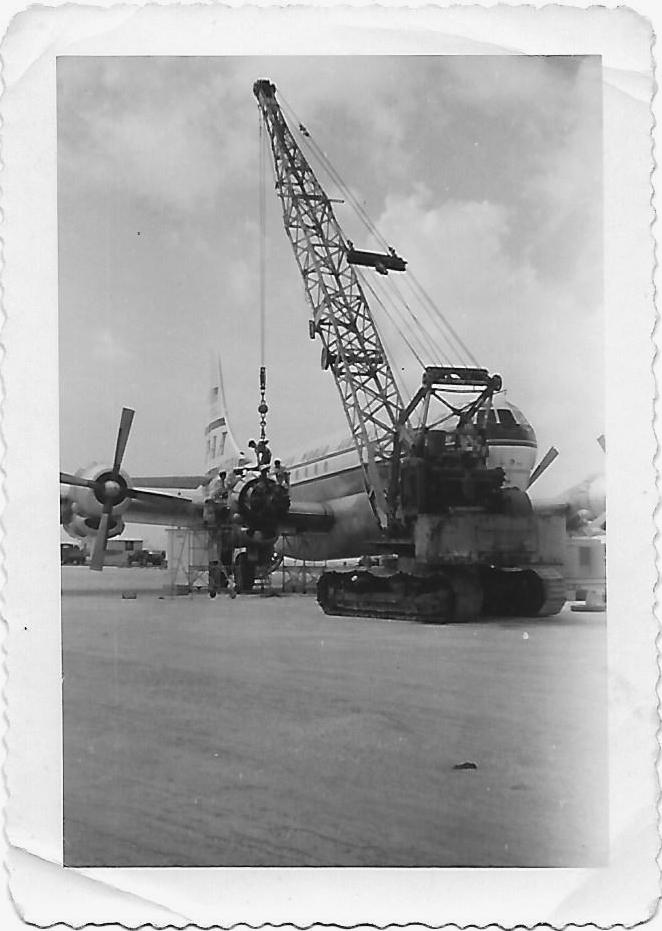
Pan Am Boeing 377 Stratocruiser undergoing engine repair at Kanton Island, ca. 1955

The American administrator, who was an employee of the Civil Aeronautics Administration (predecessor to the FAA) and island manager for that agency, also served as the U.S. resident administrator under the Department of the Interior and as a U.S. special deputy marshal under the Department of Justice. William J. Evans held this position from 1952 to 1956, during which time a crew from National Geographic magazine visited the island and highlighted it in the magazine's January 1955 issue.

Vice-president Richard Nixon and his wife visited the island in October 1953, en route to New Zealand, where they stayed overnight and were interviewed by Fred Carpenter for the local radio station KIBS. By 1956, Pan Am was operating a Boeing 377 Stratocruiser service into the airport from Los Angeles and San Francisco, via a stop in Honolulu, with these flights continuing on to Sydney with a stop at Nadi Airport in Fiji. In 1962, South Pacific Air Lines was offering flag stop service on demand into Canton Island via its scheduled passenger flight between Honolulu and Pago Pago operated with Lockheed L-1049 Super Constellation propliners.

Ultimately, the introduction of long-range jet aircraft spelled the end of Canton's usefulness as an aircraft refueling station, and all airlines ended their operations there by the late 1950s—except for Pan Am, which continued a monthly service with Douglas DC-7C prop aircraft via Auckland, Nadi, Pago Pago, Kanton, Honolulu and return. This service was conducted using the outbased DC-7C aircraft N743PA and N744PA, which provided feeder service from Auckland to three points on the jet service schedules. The last Pan Am flight was in November 1965 when the final DC-7C returned to Miami after the opening of a new airport in Auckland, enabling New Zealand to be added to Pan Am's Boeing 707 jet routes. Canton's airport remained operational, however, as an emergency landing field.

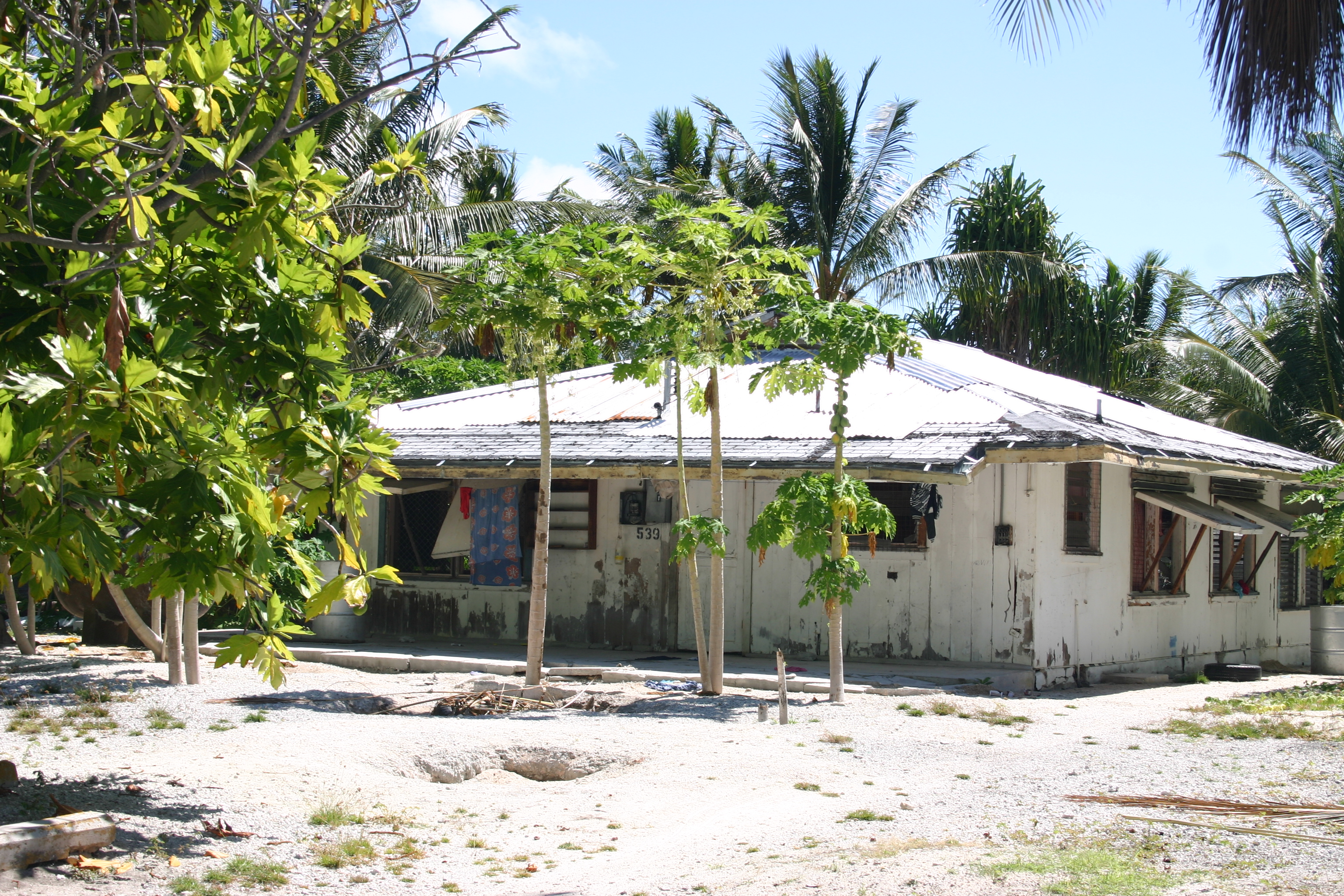
House on Canton Island, 2008.

=== After the airlines ===
In 1960 a tracking station for the Mercury program was built on Canton, and used through November 1965. The U.S. Air Force and the U.S. Space and Missile Systems Organization continued to use the island for missile-tracking operations through 1976. That year marked the complete end of the American presence; the airfield was abandoned and all U.S. personnel were removed. The British closed their post office, ending their presence on Canton as well. With the independence of Kiribati from Britain in 1979, the Anglo-American condominium was formally terminated, and the island transferred to Kiribati sovereignty. Canton's post office was reopened by the Kiribati government, and the island was repopulated with a few people from the more crowded atolls of the Gilbert Islands.

Canton is occasionally visited by Republic of Kiribati vessels, the U.S. Coast Guard and various fishing boats. In 2008, Canton and the rest of the Phoenix Islands became the Phoenix Islands Protected Area (PIPA), the world's largest marine protected area, covering a total area of 410,500 km^{2} (158,500 sq mi) of land and ocean. In 2007 it was submitted, together with the rest of the PIPA, as a UNESCO World Heritage site. A station of the Global Seismographic Network, IU KNTN, hosted by the Kiribati Weather Service was established in 2007 with current data shown as of August 2016.

In 2010, a British yachtsman and his crew, who were sailing from Hawaii to Australia, stopped at Canton and discovered the 24 islanders (14 adults and 10 children) were dangerously short of food. An expected supply ship had not arrived and the islanders had been living on fish and coconuts for several months. The yacht crew contacted the UK Coastguard, who contacted the U.S. Coast Guard to arrange relief supplies.

== See also ==
- Canton and Enderbury Islands
- Canton Island Airport
- List of Guano Island claims
- Treaty of Tarawa
