= Canton and Enderbury Islands =

Former US-British territory in the Pacific

Coordinates: 3°00′S 171°24′W

- 1939–1979
- Flag

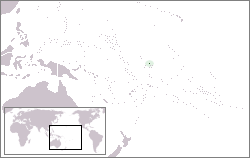
- Canton and Enderbury Islands
- Status: Condominium under the administration of the United States and the United Kingdom
- Capital: Tebaronga, Canton Island
- History
  - Established: 6 April 1939
  - UK cession/ US evacuation: 12 July 1979
Preceded by	Succeeded by
Gilbert and Ellice Islands	Kiribati

The Canton and Enderbury Islands consist of the coral atolls of Canton Island (also Kanton) and Enderbury in the northeastern part of the Phoenix Islands, about 1,850 miles (3,000 km) south of Hawaii in the central Pacific Ocean.

== History ==
The islands were vital naval and air bases on the route between the Americas and the Philippines and Australia and were claimed by both the United Kingdom and the United States. From 1939 to 1979, they formed an Anglo–American condominium, with administration jointly exercised by the U.S. and the UK. This arrangement only covered Canton and Enderbury islands; the remaining Phoenix Islands were still claimed by the U.S. under the Guano Islands Act, but aside from Hull Island were either abandoned or remained under exclusive British control until 1979.

Both the UK and the U.S. claimed sovereignty over the islands from the mid–19th century. The official British claim was formally reasserted on 6 August 1936, and in March 1937 the islands were attached to its Gilbert and Ellice Islands Colony; establishing a radio station on Canton on 31 August 1937. In June 1937 a spat occurred at Canton between USS Avocet and HMS Wellington and their crews. In response, on 26 July President Roosevelt approved a U.S. Navy plan to occupy Canton, and on 3 March 1938 formally reasserted the United States claim, placing Canton and Enderbury under the control of the Department of the Interior. Seven U.S. citizens from the American Equatorial Islands Colonization Project landed on Canton on 7 March. To resolve these conflicting claims, the two governments signed an agreement on 6 April 1939 providing for joint administration over the islands without prejudice to the claims of either side.

The United States and the United Kingdom relinquished control over the islands to the government of newly independent Kiribati; U.S. personnel left the island on 12 July 1979, the date of Kiribati's independence. The Treaty of Tarawa, signed on 20 September 1979 and ratified by the United States Senate on 21 June 1983 and entered into force on 23 September 1983, formally relinquished U.S. claims over the former Canton and Enderbury Islands Condominium. In this treaty, the U.S. acknowledged Kiribati sovereignty over fourteen islands, but reserved the right to military bases. Today the islands form part of the Phoenix Islands administrative group within the Republic of Kiribati.

As of 2005, the population of Canton Island was 41, down from 61 in 2000. In May 2010 the population was reportedly 24, with 14 adults and 10 children. The island's sole village is called Tebaronga. Enderbury is uninhabited.

In 2006, the government of Kiribati declared the islands, together with other Phoenix Islands, to be a marine protected area, to preserve the unique flora and fauna of the archipelago and its surrounding waters.

== In popular culture ==
The short story by Noël Coward, Mr and Mrs Edgehill, was inspired by the unusual dual administration of the islands with the main protagonists loosely based on the British Resident, Frank Fleming and his wife, Lucy, who he met during a brief stay at the American hotel on Canton Island in 1941. The story was adapted for a BBC television film, starring Judy Dench and Ian Holm in 1985.

== See also ==
- List of Guano Island claims
