= Enderbury Island =

Island of Kiribati in the Pacific Ocean

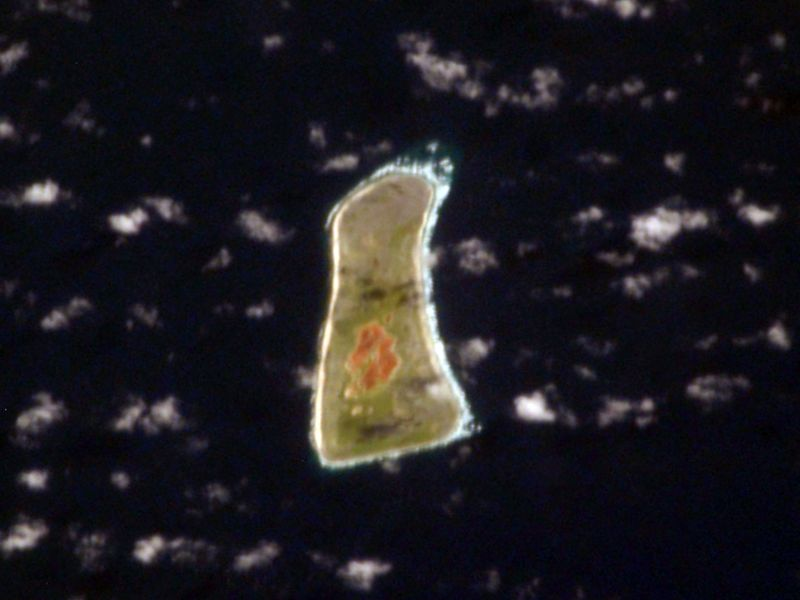

- Location within Kiribati Location within Oceania Location within Pacific Ocean

Geography
- Location: Pacific Ocean
- Coordinates: 3°08′S 171°05′W
- Archipelago: Phoenix Islands
- Length: 4.8 km (2.98 mi)
- Width: 1.6 km (0.99 mi)

Administration
- Republic of Kiribati
- Phoenix Islands Protected Area

Demographics
- Population: 0

Enderbury Island, also known as Ederbury Island or Guano Island, is a small, uninhabited atoll 63 km ESE of Kanton Island in the Pacific Ocean at 3°08′S 171°05′W. It is about 1 mile (1.6 km) wide and 3 miles (4.8 km) long, with a reef stretching out 60–200 metres. Forming a part of the Canton and Enderbury Islands condominium from 1939 to 1979, the island is now a possession of the Republic of Kiribati.

Kiribati declared the Phoenix Islands Protected Area in 2006, with the park being expanded in 2008. The 164,200-square-mile (425,300-square-kilometer) marine reserve contains eight coral atolls including Kanton.

== Flora and fauna ==
=== Enderbury's flora and fauna ===
The island is flat and bare, with elevations between 15 and 22 feet. Vegetation consists of low shrubs, including herbs, bunchgrass, sida and morning-glory vines, together with a few clumps of trees, including coconut palms and kou trees. Unlike other atolls, Enderbury has only a small lagoon; most of the island is land. Bird life is abundant, as is the rat population, according to E.H. Bryan Feral cats used to exist, but recently died out. Enderbury has been identified as the most important green sea turtle nesting area in the Phoenix Islands group.

An expedition to eradicate the Polynesian rat population was conducted in 2011.

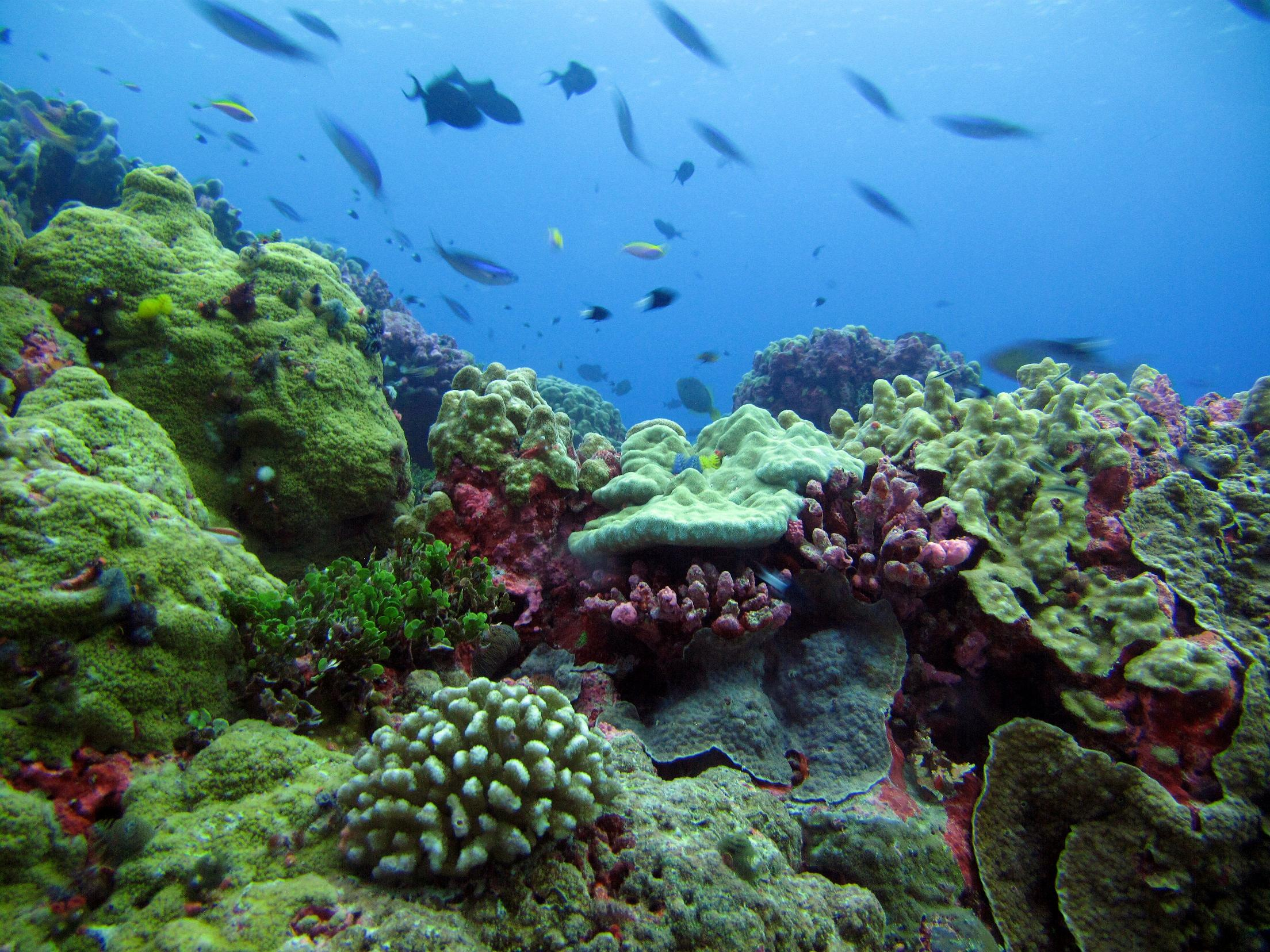
Corals reefs on Enderbury (part of the Phoenix Islands Protected Area), represent what a reef might have looked like one thousand years ago. Image courtesy of Dr. Randi Rotjan, New England Aquarium

=== Enderbury's reefs ===
The 2000 surveys (Obura, et al.) identified that sites on the reef averaged 20–25% Live Coral Cover. The dominance of encrusting/submassive corals at the windward site and the few large coral colonies and many small ones were seen, indicating frequent breakage preventing growth to large size, with continual breakage of branching and plating forms. Damage to branching and plating forms was as the result of wave energy on the southern, eastern and northern reefs of the islands, which create coral rubble at the base of the reef. The most abundant coral species at Enderbury were: Pavona maldivensis, Leptastrea purpurea, Goniastrea stelligera, Favites pentagona, Pocillopora verrucosa, Porites lutea, Pavona minuta, Pavona clavus and Pavona varians.

== History ==
Enderbury Island was discovered in 1823 by Capt. James J. Coffin from the British whaleship Transit and named after Samuel Enderby (1756–1829), owner of a London whaling company. Enderbury is a misspelling. The island was visited by the US Exploring Expedition on January 9, 1841. The first interest in Enderbury came in 1860, with guano mining. The Guano Islands Act of 1856 allowed Americans to claim islands which had guano deposits; Enderbury was one of them. The start was slow, but guano mining in Enderbury reached its peak in 1870, under the Phoenix Guano Company, when 6,000 tons were mined and shipped in 64 days. The Americans left in 1877, and the Pacific entrepreneur John T. Arundel took over in the 1880s.

Very little else occurred at Enderbury until March 1937, when the British Government claimed the Phoenix Islands, including Enderbury, and included it in the Gilbert and Ellice Islands Colony. In March 1938, the U.S. President Franklin Roosevelt also declared Enderbury, along with the nearby island of Canton, to be under the jurisdiction of the United States Department of the Interior. These islands had been deemed a good strategic point for stopover of PanAm flights to Australia and New Zealand, though Enderbury itself was never used for this. In early 1939, a deal was signed for the U.S. and U.K. to share them as the Canton and Enderbury Islands condominium.

Four colonists from the American Equatorial Islands Colonization Project settled on the island in 1938, to uphold the American claim of ownership, but they were evacuated in 1942 during World War II by USCGC Taney, and all buildings were destroyed to prevent them from being used by the Japanese.

Today, Enderbury is home to many species of seabirds which roost there and is under the sovereignty of the Republic of Kiribati. In 2008, it became, together with the other Phoenix Islands, a part of the Phoenix Islands Protected Area (PIPA), the largest marine protected area in the world. The PIPA's official website recently revealed that Enderbury has recently been invaded by non-indigenous coconut palms from the islands of Manra, Orona and Nikumaroro.

== See also ==
- List of Guano Island claims
- List of islands
- Desert island

== Sources ==
- Bryan, Edwin H.: American Polynesia : coral islands of the Central Pacific; Honolulu, Hawaii 1941
- Skaggs, Jimmy M.: The great guano rush : entrepreneurs and American overseas expansion; New York, NY : St. Martin's Pr., 1994 ISBN 0-312-10316-6
