= Treaty of Tokehega =

1980 treaty between New Zealand and the United States

Treaty of Tokehega Ko te Feagaiga o Tokehega
Treaty between the United States of America and New Zealand on the Delimitation of the Maritime Boundary between Tokelau and the United States of America Ko he Feagaiga i te va o Niu Hila ma te Iunaite Hitete o Amerika i te Faiga o na Tuakoi i te Tai i te va o Tokelau ma te Iunaite Hitete o Amerika
- Signed: 2 December 1980
- Location: Atafu, Tokelau
- Effective: 3 September 1983
- Condition: Ratification by both parties
- Signatories: United States; New Zealand (Tokelau)
- Languages: English; Tokelauan

The Treaty of Tokehega (Tokelauan: [tokɛˈhɛŋa]), officially titled the Treaty between the United States of America and New Zealand on the Delimitation of the Maritime Boundary between Tokelau and the United States of America, is a 1980 treaty between New Zealand and the United States that settles disputed claims and delineates the maritime boundary between Tokelau and American Samoa. The treaty's short name is a portmanteau of Tokelau and Olohega ([oloˈhɛŋa], the Tokelauan name of Swains Island), which the boundary separates.

== History ==
Swains Island was initially settled by Polynesian voyagers and later conquered by Tokelauans from Fakaofo. In 1856, while populated by Tokelauans, Swains Island was settled by the American Eli Hutchinson Jennings and his Samoan wife Malia. Jennings claimed ownership of the island and governed it as a semi-independent settlement.

During the late 19th century, the United States and the United Kingdom made competing claims to many islands in the Pacific Ocean, including the three atolls of Tokelau, Swains Island, and several of the Ellice, Phoenix, Line and Cook Islands. A number of islands were declared to be British protectorates under the jurisdiction of the Western Pacific High Commission, while the Gilbert and Ellice Islands became a Crown colony in 1916.

In 1909, the United Kingdom recognised U.S. sovereignty over Swains Island after a tax dispute. In 1925 the United States formally annexed Swains Island, administering it as part of American Samoa. The United Kingdom transferred the administration of the Cook Islands and Tokelau to New Zealand, in 1901 and 1926.

In 1977, the United States and New Zealand established exclusive economic zones, which partially overlapped around their territories of American Samoa, Cook Islands and Tokelau. In addition, Tuvalu and Kiribati, which contained the other disputed islands, became independent in 1978 and 1979. In this context, the United States sought to sign treaties to resolve the maritime boundaries and formally abandon its claims to the islands, establishing friendly relations with the new nations or autonomous territories. Such treaties included the Treaty of Tarawa and the Cook Islands–United States Maritime Boundary Treaty.

The last treaty in this series was with Tokelau. In this case, while resolving the maritime boundary and abandoning its claims to the three atolls of Tokelau, the United States also sought to obtain recognition of U.S. sovereignty over Swains Island from the people of Tokelau, who claimed the island as part of their archipelago. Although New Zealand handled international relations on behalf of Tokelau, the New Zealand government consulted extensively with Tokelauan leaders during the negotiations, allowed them to make their own decision on the subject, and authorised them to sign the treaty themselves. The United States sent ambassador Anne Clark Martindell to Atafu to sign the treaty with them, and the event became more dramatic when the ambassador's boat almost capsized when going over the reef to reach the atoll.

== Terms ==
The treaty was signed on 2 December 1980. It specifies a maritime boundary of seven geodetic line segments defined by eight individual coordinate points, located between Swains Island and the three atolls of Tokelau. The treaty also specifies that each country shall not claim sovereignty over the waters on each other's side of the boundary, and it explicitly confirms that the United States recognises the sovereignty of Tokelauans, exercised by New Zealand, over the three atolls.

Although the text of the treaty does not explicitly mention Swains Island, it states in the preamble that New Zealand had not claimed as part of Tokelau any island administered as part of American Samoa. The location of the maritime boundary and the map attached to the treaty also imply recognition of U.S. sovereignty over Swains Island.

== Aftermath ==
The treaty was ratified by both parties and came into force on 3 September 1983. Years later, some Tokelauans began to express their regret over the loss of Swains Island, or Olohega in Tokelauan. In 2002, the lead singer of the New Zealand music group Te Vaka, Opetaia Foa‘i, who is a descendant of Tokelauans, wrote song "Hāloa Olohega" (English: "Poor Olohega") about it. The popular song sparked a heated debate about the subject, including allegations that the leaders had been tricked into signing the treaty. The New Zealand and U.S. governments strongly denied these allegations, pointing to the extensive consultation with the Tokelauan leaders during the negotiations.

In preparation for a self-determination referendum in 2006, the government of Tokelau wrote a draft constitution, whose preamble lists Olohega as one of the four "historic islands" of Tokelau. The government clarified that this mention was symbolic and confirmed that the island was legally part of American Samoa, and that any change to this situation could only be done by agreement with the United States, which was unlikely. The referendum was supported by most voters but failed to reach the required two-thirds majority.

Despite the clarification by the government and the failed referendum, the claim over Olohega became a prominent subject. In 2007 the parliament of Tokelau proposed a flag containing four stars, roughly positioned according to the locations of the four atolls, including Olohega. Another self-determination referendum was held that year with more eligible voters and more support, but still fell short of the two-thirds requirement. In 2008, the proposed flag was modified, in a compromise still including four stars but arranged in the shape of the Southern Cross. This modified proposal was officially adopted in 2009.

In 2011, Tokelauan singer Vaniah Toloa, son of the then Head of Government of Tokelau Foua Toloa, wrote the song "Tokelau Ke Manuia" (English: "Tokelau Be Well"), which fondly mentions Olohega along with the three atolls of Tokelau.
