= Cook Islands–United States Maritime Boundary Treaty =

1980 treaty between the Cook Islands and United States

Treaty between the United States of America and the Cook Islands on Friendship and Delimitation of the Maritime Boundary between the United States of America and the Cook Islands
- Type: Boundary delimitation
- Signed: 11 June 1980
- Location: Rarotonga, Cook Islands
- Effective: 8 September 1983
- Parties: Cook Islands; United States
- Depositary: United Nations Secretariat
- Languages: English (authentic) and Maori

The Cook Islands–United States Maritime Boundary Treaty is a 1980 treaty that establishes the maritime boundary between the Cook Islands and American Samoa. It resolved a number of territorial disputes between the Cook Islands and the United States.

The treaty was signed in Rarotonga on 11 June 1980. The boundary is an equidistant line between the nearest islands of the two states. The boundary is 566 nautical miles (1,048 km; 651 mi) long and consists of 24 maritime straight-line segments defined by 25 individual coordinate points. The north end of the boundary forms the tripoint with Tokelau and the south end of the boundary forms the tripoint with Niue.

The treaty resolved a number of territorial disputes between the Cook Islands and the United States. First, the United States recognised the Cook Islands' sovereignty over the islands of Pukapuka, Manihiki, Rakahanga, and Penrhyn. Second, the United States implicitly demonstrated that it had abandoned its claim that Tokelau was part of American Samoa, since the boundary was set to terminate at its north end at a point at which a hypothetical equidistant boundary tripoint between the Cook Islands, American Samoa, and Tokelau would have existed. In December 1980, the United States confirmed the tripoint by agreeing to the Treaty of Tokehega with New Zealand, which formally established the Tokelau–American Samoa border.

The full name of the treaty is Treaty between the United States of America and the Cook Islands on Friendship and Delimitation of the Maritime Boundary between the United States of America and the Cook Islands. The treaty was ratified by the United States and the Cook Islands in 1983 and came into force on 8 September 1983.

== See also ==
- Cook Islands–United States relations
- Guano Islands Act
