= Malden Island =

Island in the central Pacific Ocean

Malden Island (Independence Island)

- Location within Kiribati Location within Oceania Location within Pacific Ocean

Geography
- Location: Pacific Ocean
- Coordinates: 4°1′S 154°56′W
- Kiribati

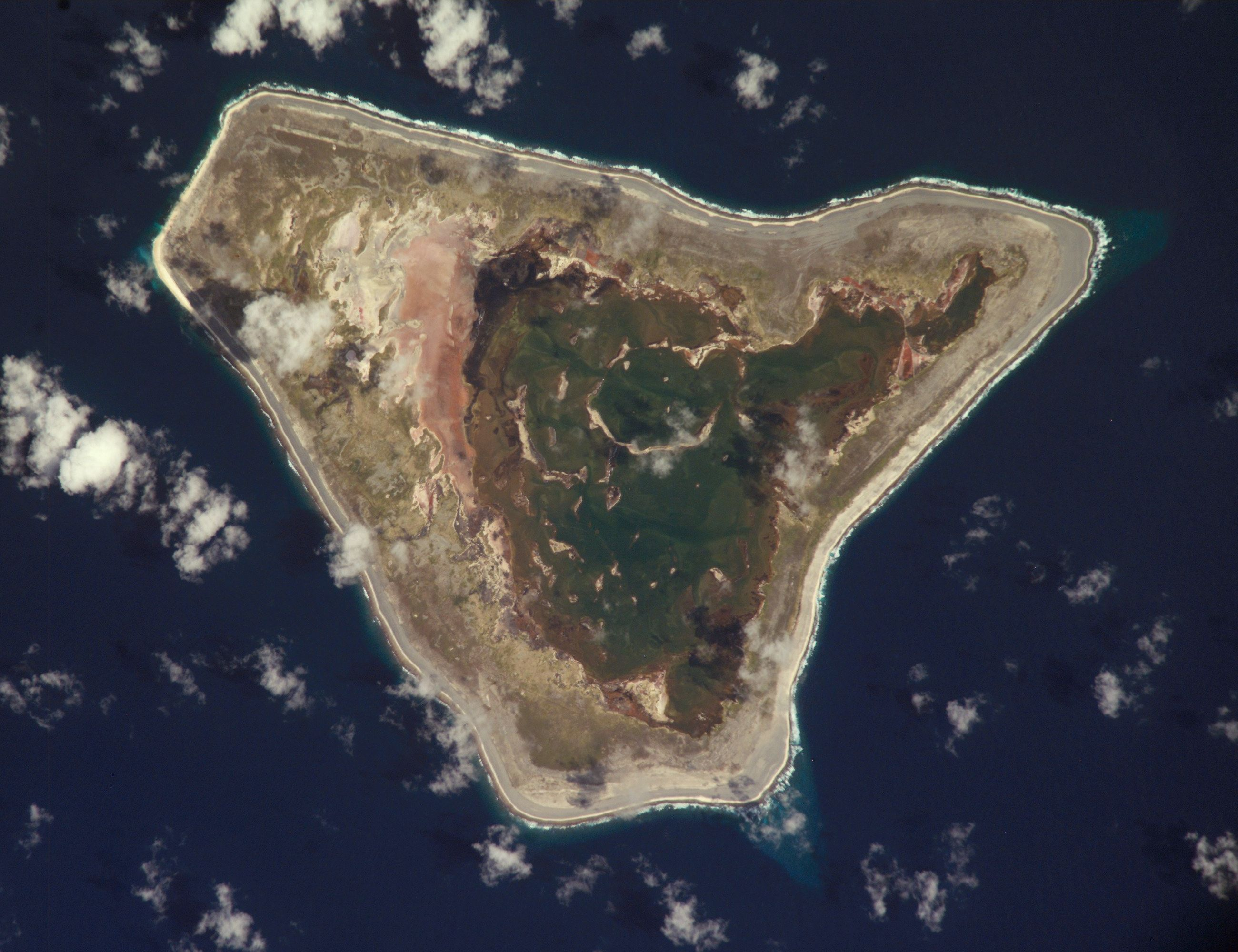
NASA orbital photo of Malden Island (north at top)

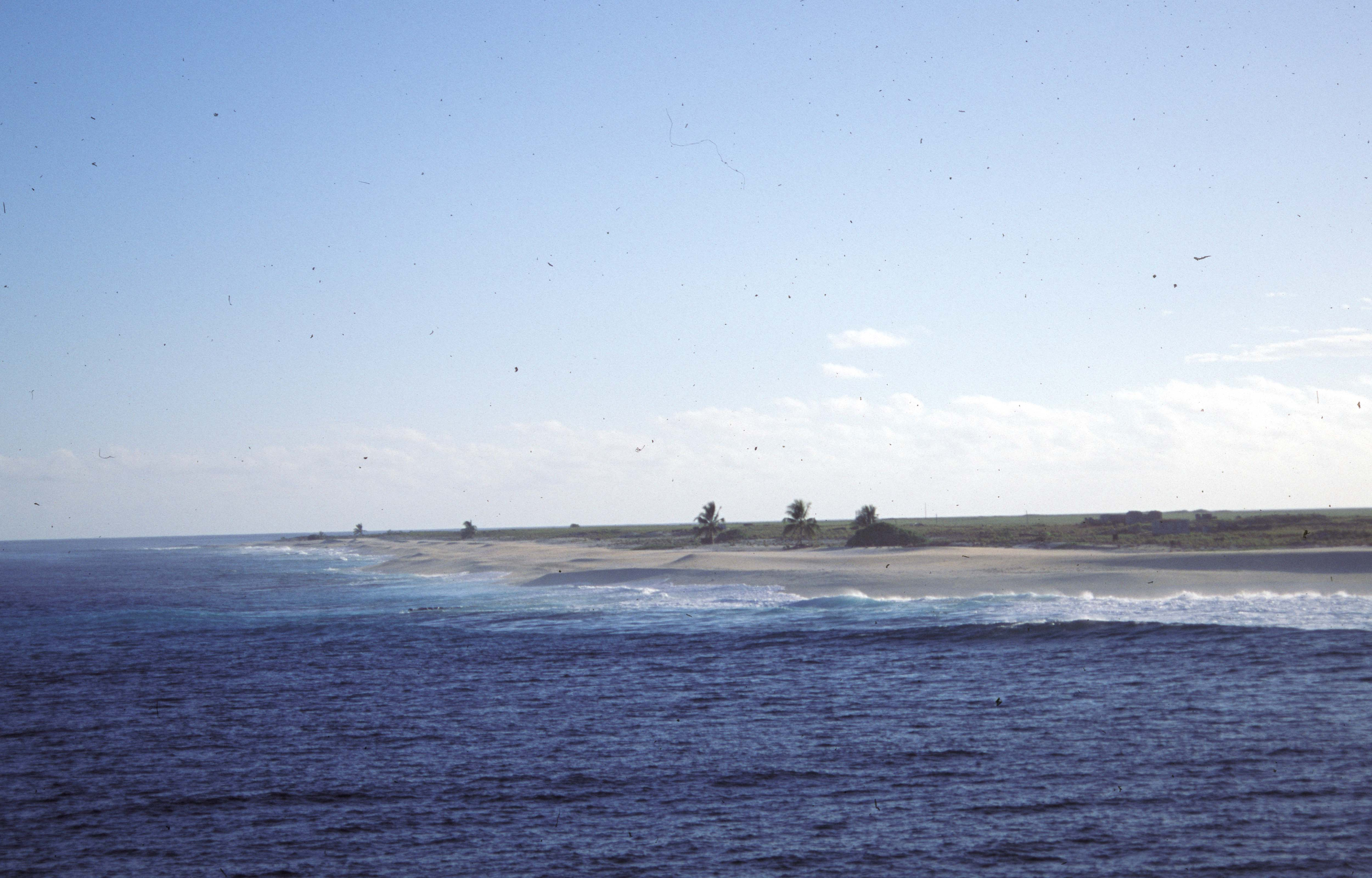
Boat landing on Malden Island with ruins of old settlement

Malden Island, sometimes called Independence Island in the 19th century, is a low, arid, uninhabited atoll in the central Pacific Ocean, about 39 km^{2} (15 sq mi) in area. It is one of the Line Islands belonging to the Republic of Kiribati. The lagoon is entirely enclosed by land, though it is connected to the sea by underground channels, and is quite salty.

The island is chiefly notable for its ancient stone architecture, its once-extensive deposits of phosphatic guano (exploited by Australian interests from c. 1860–1927), its former use as the site of the first British H-bomb tests (Operation Grapple, 1957), and its current importance as a protected area for breeding seabirds.

The island is designated as the Malden Island Wildlife Sanctuary. In 2014 the Kiribati government established a 12-nautical-mile (14 mi; 22 km) fishing exclusion zone around each of the southern Line Islands (Caroline (commonly called Millennium), Flint, Vostok, Malden, and Starbuck).

== Geography ==
Malden Island is located 242 nautical miles (278 mi; 448 km) south of the equator, 1,530 nautical miles (1,761 mi; 2,834 km) south of Honolulu, Hawaii, and more than 4,000 nautical miles (7,000 km) west of the coast of South America. The nearest land is uninhabited Starbuck Island, 110 nautical miles (204 km; 127 mi) to the southwest. The closest inhabited place is Tongareva (Penrhyn Island), 243 nautical miles (450 km; 280 mi) to the southwest. The nearest airport is on Kiritimati (Christmas Island), 365 nautical miles (676 km; 420 mi) to the northwest. Other nearby islands (all uninhabited) include Jarvis Island, 373 nautical miles (691 km; 429 mi) to the northwest, Vostok Island, 385 nautical miles (713 km; 443 mi) to the south-southeast, and Caroline (Millennium) Island, 460 nautical miles (852 km; 529 mi) to the southeast.

The island has roughly the shape of an equilateral triangle, with 8 km (5 mi) on a side, aligned with the southwest side running northwest to southeast. The west and south corners are slightly truncated, shortening the north, east and southwest coasts to about 7 km (4 mi), and adding shorter west and south coasts about 1 to 2 km (½–1 mi) in length. A large, mostly shallow, irregularly shaped lagoon, containing a number of small islets, fills the east central part of the island. The lagoon is entirely enclosed by land, but only by relatively narrow strips along its north and east sides. It is connected to the sea by underground channels, and is quite salty. Most of the land area of the island lies to the south and west of the lagoon. The total area of the island is about 39.3 km^{2} (15 sq mi).

The island is very low, no more than 10 m (33 ft) above sea level at its highest point. The highest elevations are found along a rim that closely follows the coastline. The interior forms a depression that is only a few metres above sea level in the western part and is below sea level (filled by the lagoon) in the east central part. Because of this topography, the ocean cannot be seen from much of Malden's interior.

There is no standing fresh water on Malden Island, though a fresh water lens may exist.

A continuous heavy surf falls all along the coast, forming a narrow white to gray sandy beach. Except on the west coast, where the white sandy beach is more extensive than elsewhere, a strip of dark gray coral rubble, forming a series of low ridges parallel to the coast, lies within the narrow beach, extending inward to the island rim.

== Flora and fauna ==
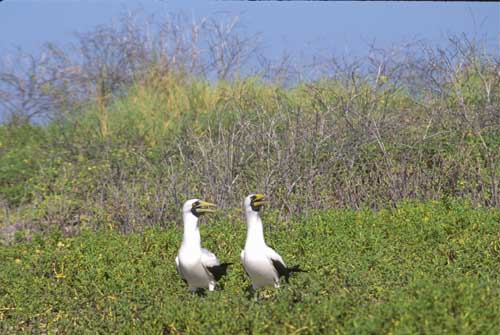
A pair of masked boobies (Sula dactylatra) calling on Malden Island

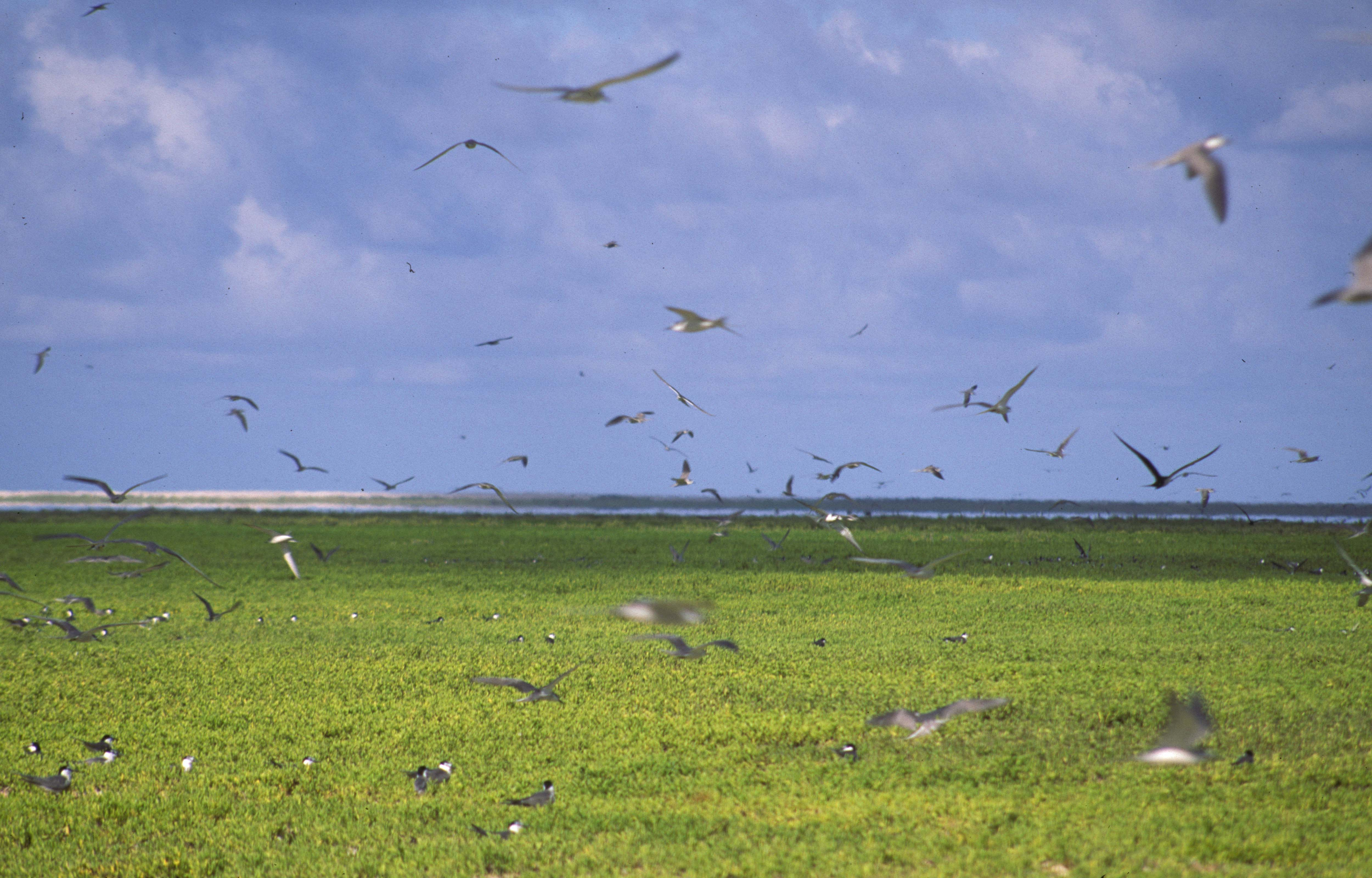
Grey-backed terns flying over Malden Island with lagoon in background

Because of Malden's isolation and aridity, its vegetation is extremely limited. Sixteen species of vascular plants have been recorded, of which nine are indigenous.The island is largely covered in stunted Sida fallax scrub, low herbs and grasses. Few, if any, of the clumps of stunted Pisonia grandis once found on the island still survive. Coconut palms planted by the guano diggers did not thrive, although a few dilapidated trees may still be seen. Introduced weeds, including the low-growing woody vine Tribulus cistoides, now dominate extensive open areas, providing increased cover for young sooty terns.

Malden is an important breeding island for about a dozen species including masked boobies (Sula dactylatra), red-footed booby (Sula sula), tropicbirds (Phaethontidae), great frigatebird (Fregata minor), lesser frigatebird (Fregata ariel), grey-backed tern (Onychoprion lunata), red-tailed tropicbird (Phaethon rubricauda) and sooty terns (sterna fuscata). It is also an important winter-stop for the bristle-thighed curlew (Numenius tahitiensis), a migrant from Alaska, and other migratory seabirds (nineteen species in all).

Two kinds of lizards, the mourning gecko (Lepidodactylus lugubris) and snake-eyed skink (Cryptoblepharus boutonii), are present on Malden, together with brown libellulid dragonfly.

Cats, pigs, goats and house mice were introduced to Malden during the guano-digging period. While the goats and pigs have all died off, feral cats and house mice are still present. Small numbers of green turtles nest on the beaches, and hermit crabs abound.

== History ==
=== Discovery ===
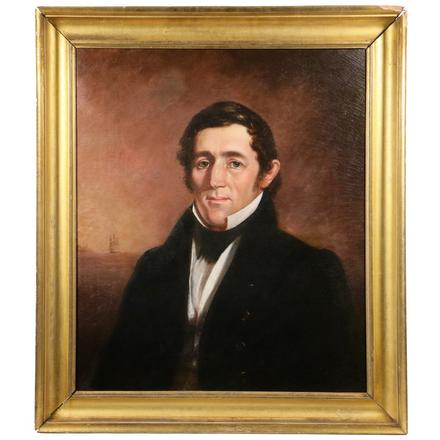
Samuel Bunker (ca. 1845)

The earliest documented sighting of Malden Island by Europeans was on 25 March 1825, by Captain Samuel Bunker (1796–1874) of the whaler Alexander of Nantucket. Bunker's journal for that day mentioned that "it proved to be an island seen by the Sarah Ann of London and the Independence of Nantucket, Capt. Whippey". They were also whaling vessels. That logbook extract may explain several things: why Malden Island was once known as "Independence Island", Sarah Ann Island (a phantom island), and that Bunker was not the first European to see the island. He could not land, and sailed on the next day.

On 30 July 1825, the island was seen again by Captain The 7th Lord Byron (a cousin of the famous poet). Byron, commanding the British warship HMS Blonde, was returning to London from a special mission to Honolulu to repatriate the remains of the young king and queen of Hawaii, who had died of measles during a visit to Britain. The island was named after Lieutenant Charles Robert Malden, navigator of the Blonde, who sighted the island and briefly explored it. Andrew Bloxam, naturalist of the Blonde, and James Macrae, a botanist travelling for the Royal Horticultural Society, joined in exploring the island and recorded their observations. Malden may have been the island sighted in 1823 by another captain, William Clark of the whaling vessel Winslow.

=== Early history ===
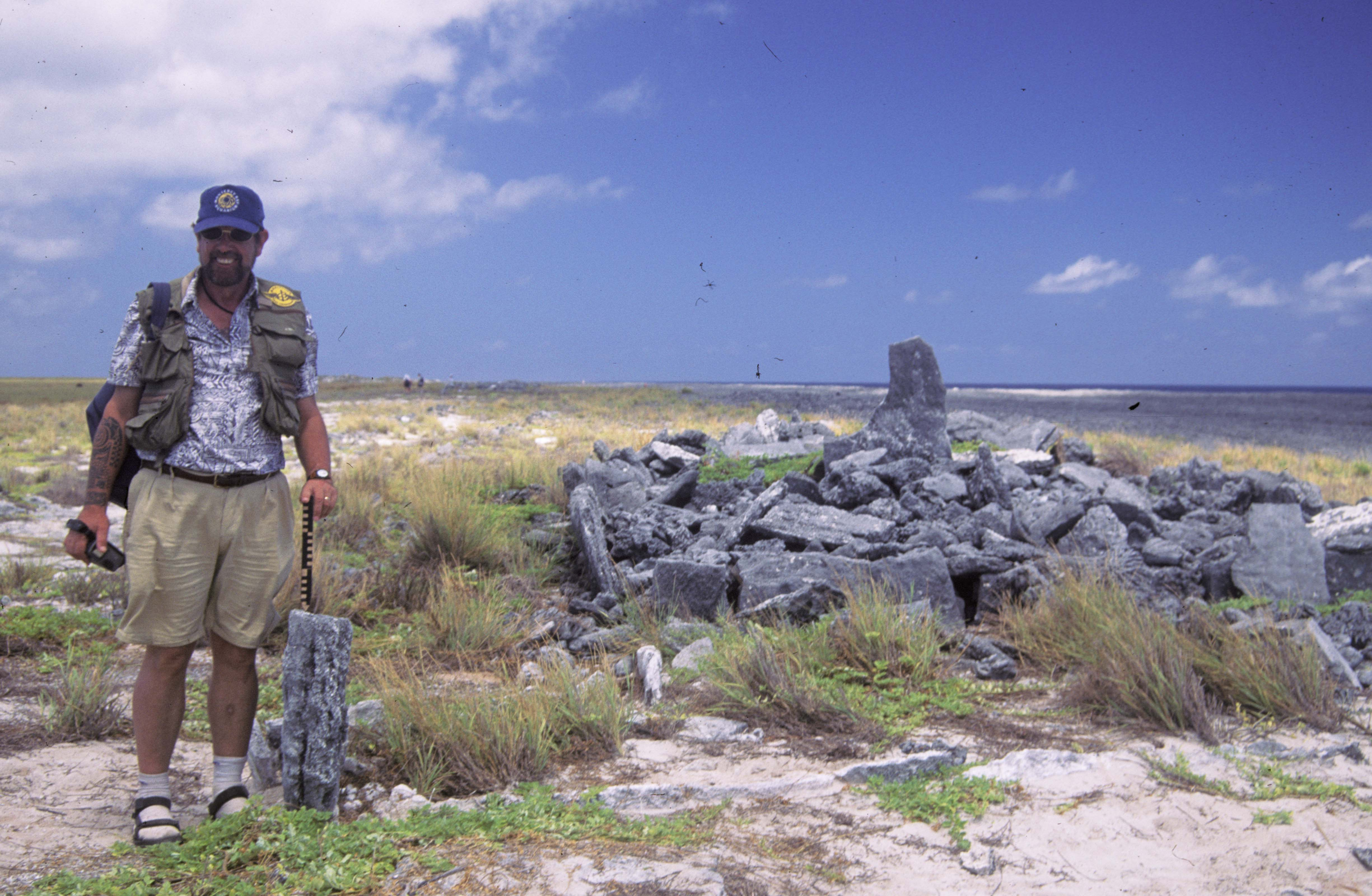
Early Polynesian ruins on Malden Island

At the time of its discovery by Europeans, Malden had no population. However, extensive archaeological sites on the island point to occupation by Polynesian people in the past. Sites on the island are consistent with pre-contact Polynesian architecture of the wider region and are noted to be especially similar in form to architectural forms in Tonga.

These sites are clustered along the northwest and south beach ridges. A total of 21 archaeological sites have been catalogued on the island. The sites include temple platforms, called marae, house sites, and graves. Due to the nature of early archaeological classification of sites at the time of classification, these sites are composed of irregular groups of above ground architecture and should not be taken as representative given a lack of more intensive subterranean investigation. Comparisons with stone structures on Tuamotu atolls show that a population of between 100 and 200 people could have produced all of the Malden structures. Marae of a similar type are found on Raivavae, one of the Austral Islands. However, no studies have been conducted on the agricultural potential of the island to corroborate this.

=== Whalers and guano diggers ===
In the first half of the 19th century, during the heyday of American whaling in the central Pacific, Malden was visited on a number of occasions by American whalers.

In 1918, schooner Annie Larsen, infamous for her role in the Hindu–German Conspiracy, was stranded at Malden Island.

Malden was claimed by the U.S. Guano Company under the Guano Islands Act of 1856, which authorized citizens to take possession of uninhabited islands under the authority of the United States for the purpose of removing guano, a valuable agricultural fertilizer. Before the American company could begin their operations, the island was occupied by an Australian company under British licence. This company and its successors exploited the island continuously from the 1860s through 1927.

Writer Beatrice Grimshaw, a visitor to Malden in the guano-digging era, decried the "glaring barrenness of the bit island", declaring that "...shade, coolness, refreshing fruit, pleasant sights and sounds: there are none. For those who live on the island, it is the scene of an exile which has to be endured somehow or other". She described Malden as containing "a little settlement fronted by a big wooden pier, and a desolate plain of low greyish-green herbage, relieved here and there by small bushes bearing insignificant yellow flowers". Water for settlers was produced by large distillation plants, since no fresh-water wells could be successfully dug on the island.

The five or six European supervisors on the island were given "a row of little tin-roofed, one-storeyed houses above the beach", while the native labourers from Niue Island and Aitutaki were housed in "big, barn-like shelters". Grimshaw described these edifices as being "large, bare, shady buildings fitted with wide shelves, on which the men spread their mats and pillows to sleep". Their food consisted of "rice, biscuits, yams, tinned beef, and tea, with a few cocoanuts for those who may fall sick". Food for the white supervisors consisted of "tinned food of various kinds, also bread, rice, fowls, pork, goat, and goat's milk", but vegetables were hard to come by.

Indentured labourers on Malden were contracted for one year, paid ten shillings per week plus room and board, and repatriated to their home islands when their contracts expired. Salaries for the supervisors were described as "quite high". Some labourers were prisoners, sentenced by New Zealand resident agents. Work hours were 5 am to 5 pm, with one hour and 45 minutes given off for meals.

The guano diggers constructed a unique railroad on Malden Island, with cars powered by large sails. Laborers pushed empty carts from the loading area up the tramway to the digging pits, where they were loaded with guano. At the end of the day, the sails were unfurled, and the train cars whisked back to the settlement by the prevailing southeastern winds. While cars were known to jump the tracks more than once during these excursions, the system seems to have worked fairly well. Railroad handcars were also used. This tramway remained in use on Malden as late as 1924, and its roadbed still exists on the island today.

Although guano digging continued on Malden through the early 1920s, all human activity on the island had ceased by the early 1930s. No further human use seems to have been made of Malden until 1956.

=== British nuclear testing ===
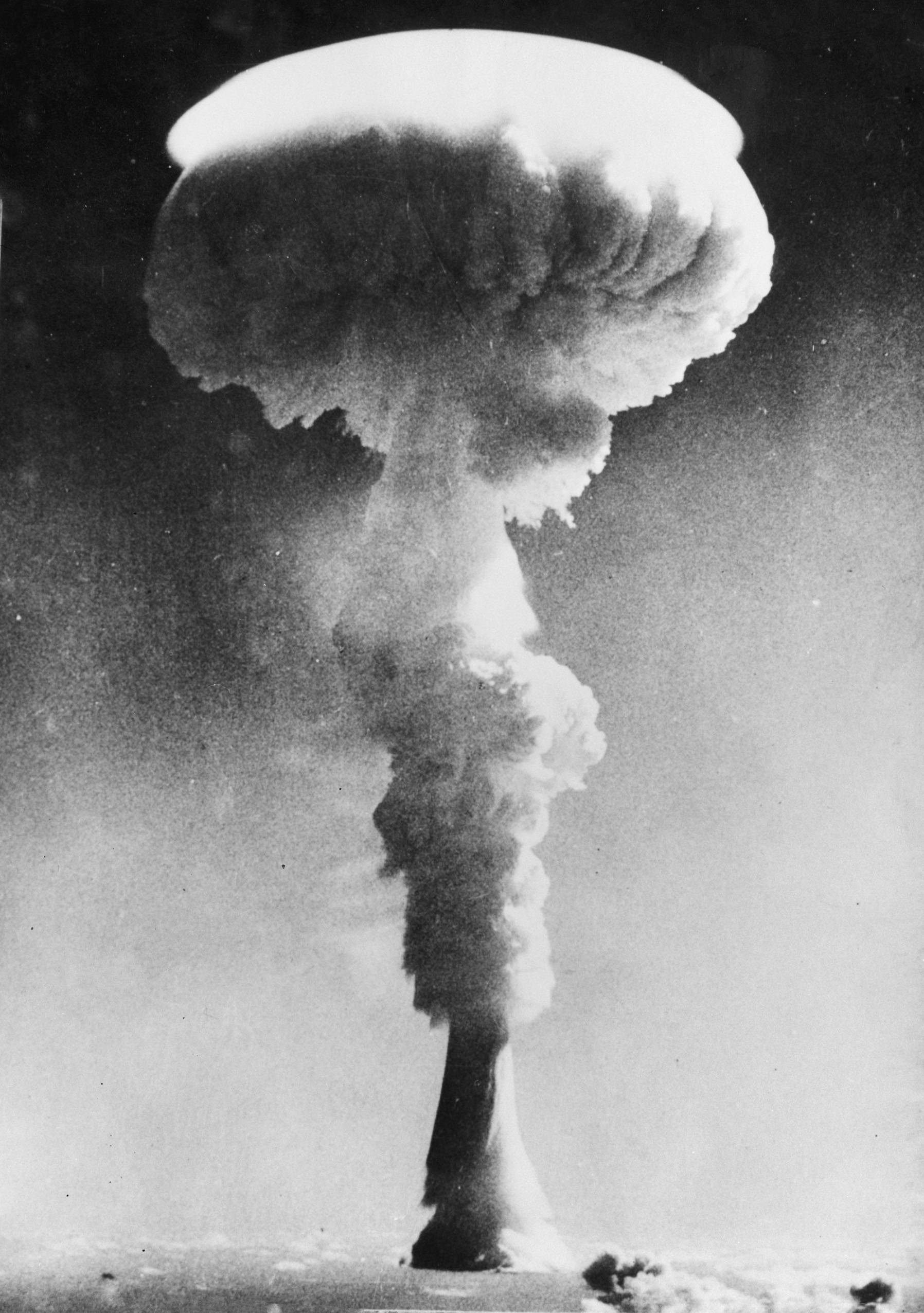
A mushroom cloud rising over Malden Island after the first British hydrogen bomb test in May 1957

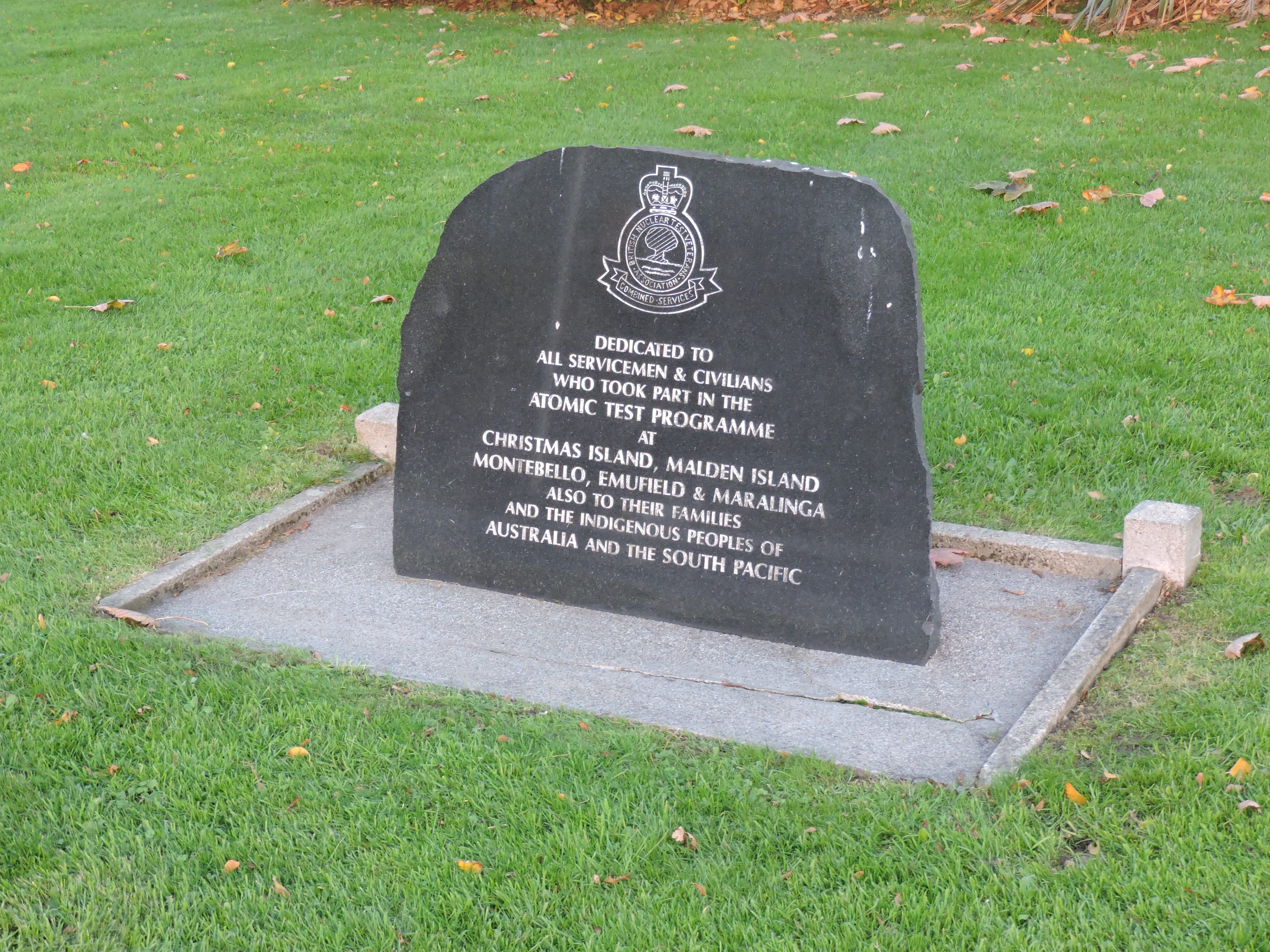
Memorial tablet in Paisley remembering the people concerned in the tests

In 1956, the United Kingdom selected Malden as the "instrumentation site" for Operation Grapple its first series of thermonuclear (H-bomb) weapons tests, based at Kiritimati (Christmas Island). In 1957, between May 15 and June 19, three thermonuclear devices with yields ranging between 200–720 kt were detonated at high altitude a short distance offshore. British officials insisted that Malden should not be called a "target island". The airstrip constructed on the island by the Royal Engineers in 1956–57 remained usable in July 1979. Multiple people were invited to observe these tests including future governor general and president of Fiji Ratu Sir Penaia Ganilau.

=== Malden Island today ===
Malden was incorporated in the British Gilbert and Ellice Islands Colony in 1972, and included in the portion of the colony which became the Republic of Kiribati in 1979. The U.S. continued to dispute British sovereignty, based on its nineteenth century Guano Act claims, until after Kiribati became independent. On 20 September 1979, representatives of the United States and Kiribati met on Tarawa Atoll in the Gilberts group of Kiribati, and signed a treaty of friendship between their two nations (commonly referred to as the Treaty of Tarawa of 1979) by which the United States recognized Kiribati's sovereignty over Malden and thirteen other islands in the Line and Phoenix Islands groups. This treaty entered into force on 23 September 1983.

The main value of the island to Kiribati lies in the resources of the 200-nautical-mile (230 mi; 370 km) exclusive economic zone which surrounds it, particularly the rich tuna fisheries. Gypsum deposits on the island itself are extensive, but do not appear to be economically viable under foreseeable market conditions, mainly due to cost of transportation. Some revenue has been realized from ecotourism; the World Discoverer, an adventure cruise ship operated by Society Expeditions, visited the island once or twice annually for several years in the mid-1990s.

Malden was reserved as a wildlife sanctuary and closed area, and was officially designated as the "Malden Island Wildlife Sanctuary", on 29 May 1975, under the 1975 Wildlife Conservation Ordinance. The principal purpose of this reservation was to protect the large breeding populations of seabirds. This sanctuary is administered by the Wildlife Conservation Unit of the Ministry of Line and Phoenix Islands Development, headquartered on Kiritimati. There is no resident staff at Malden, and occasional visits by foreign yachtsmen and fishermen cannot be monitored from Kiritimati. A fire in 1977, possibly caused by visitors, threatened breeding seabirds; this remains a potential threat, particularly during periods of drought.

The island is now an important cultural and archaeological site including 21 archaeological sites, marae, and polynesian grave sites.

== See also ==
- Protected areas of Kiribati
- Desert island
- Lists of islands

== Sources ==
- Dunmore, John (1992); Who's Who in Pacific Navigation, Australia:Melbourne University Press, ISBN 0-522-84488-X
- Quanchi, Max & Robson, John, (2005); Historical Dictionary of the Discovery and Exploration of the Pacific Islands, USA: Scarecrow Press, ISBN 0-8108-5395-7
- Bloxam, Andrew (1925), Diary of Andrew Bloxam: naturalist of the "Blonde" on her trip from England to the Hawaiian islands, 1824–25 Volume 10 of Bernice P. Bishop Museum special publication
