= Treaty of Tarawa =

1979 treaty between Kiribati and the United States

Treaty of Friendship Between the United States of America and the Republic of Kiribati
- Type: Treaty of friendship
- Signed: September 20, 1979
- Location: Tarawa, Kiribati
- Effective: September 23, 1983
- Parties: Kiribati; United States
- Languages: English; Gilbertese

On September 20, 1979, representatives of the newly independent Republic of Kiribati and of the United States met in Tarawa to sign a treaty of friendship between the two nations, known as the Treaty of Tarawa. More formally, the treaty is entitled, "Kiribati, Treaty of Friendship and Territorial Sovereignty, September 20, 1979"; and subtitled "Treaty of Friendship Between the United States of America and the Republic of Kiribati". In this treaty, the U.S. acknowledged Kiribati sovereignty over fourteen islands. The treaty was approved by the U.S. Senate on June 21, 1983. The treaty came into force on September 23, 1983, by the exchange of the instruments of ratification, which took place at Suva, Fiji. This, together with British cessation of claims, ended the Canton and Enderbury Islands Condominium, which had begun under the terms of the Guano Islands Act. Article 3 of the treaty grants the reserved right for the U.S. to maintain military bases on the islands of Canton, Enderbury or Hull.

== Islands mentioned in the treaty ==
- Birnie Island
- Canton (Kanton)
- Caroline Island
- Christmas (Kiritimati)
- Enderbury Island
- Flint Island
- Gardner (Nikumaroro)
- Hull (Orona)
- Malden Island
- McKean Island
- Rawaki Island
- Starbuck Island
- Manra Island
- Vostok Island

== See also ==
- Line Islands — divided by the treaty
- Jarvis Island, Kingman Reef, Palmyra Atoll — specific Line Islands not included the treaty
- Howland and Baker Islands — nearby U.S. possessions not included in the treaty
