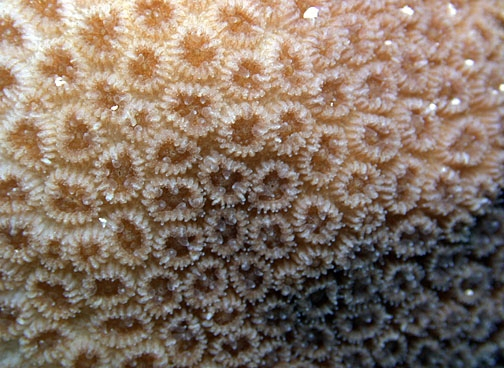

Conservation status
- Least Concern (IUCN 3.1)

Scientific classification
- Kingdom: Animalia
- Phylum: Cnidaria
- Subphylum: Anthozoa
- Class: Hexacorallia
- Order: Scleractinia
- Family: Merulinidae
- Genus: Goniastrea
- Species: G. stelligera

Binomial name
- Goniastrea stelligera (Dana, 1846)

Synonyms
- List: Astraea lobata (Milne Edwards & Haime, 1849); Dipsastraea stelligera (Dana, 1846); Favia acropora (Linnaeus, 1767); Favia hombroni (Rousseau, 1854); Favia lobata (Milne Edwards & Haime, 1849); Favia pseudostelligera Hoffmeister, 1932; Favia stelligera (Dana, 1846); Goniastrea hombroni (Rosseau, 1854); Heliastrea orion (Dana, 1846); Madrepora acropora Linnaeus, 1758; Orbicella orion Dana, 1846; Orbicella stelligera Dana, 1846; Parastrea hombroni Rouseau, 1854; Parastrea lobata Milne Edwards & Haime, 1849; Plesiastrea armata Verrill, 1872; Plesiastrea carli Nemenzo, 1979

= Goniastrea stelligera =

Species of coral

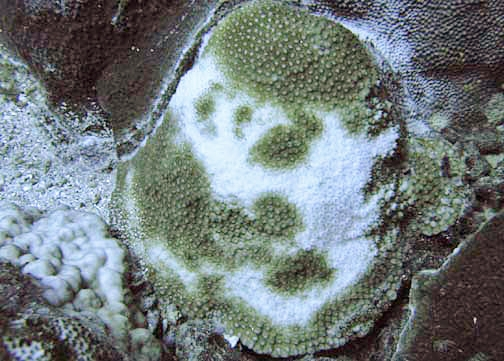
Partially bleached colony of Goniastrea stelligera

Goniastrea stelligera, commonly known as knob coral, is a species of stony coral in the family Merulinidae. It occurs in shallow water on the coast of East Africa and in the Indo-Pacific region. This is a common species of coral but it seems to be decreasing in abundance. The main threat it faces is from the destruction of its coral reef habitat, and it is also moderately susceptible to coral bleaching, so the International Union for Conservation of Nature has rated its conservation status as being "near threatened".
