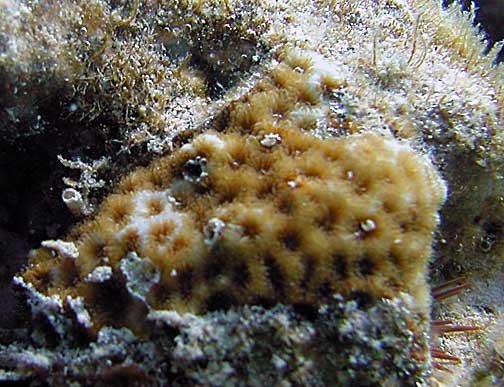
- Leptastrea bewickensis

Scientific classification
- Kingdom: Animalia
- Phylum: Cnidaria
- Class: Anthozoa
- Subclass: Hexacorallia
- Order: Scleractinia
- Family: Leptastreidae
- Genus: Leptastrea Milne-Edwards & Haime, 1848

Species
- See text

= Leptastrea =

Genus of corals

Leptastrea is a genus of massive reef building stony corals known primarily from the Indo-Pacific. Although previously assigned to Faviidae, Budd et al. (2012) assigned it to Scleractinia incertae sedis based on phylogenetic results demonstrating the polyphyly of Faviidae. Assigned to family Leptastreidae by Rowlett (2020).

== Species ==
The World Register of Marine Species lists the following species:

- Leptastrea aequalis Veron, 2000
- Leptastrea bewickensis Veron, Pichon, and Best, 1977
- Leptastrea bottae (Milne Edwards and Haime, 1849)
- Leptastrea inaequalis Klunzinger, 1879
- Leptastrea pruinosa Crossland, 1952
- Leptastrea purpurea (Dana, 1846) - (Ocellated brain coral)
- Leptastrea transversa Klunzinger, 1879
