= Coral reefs of Kiribati =

Pacific Ocean Island chain

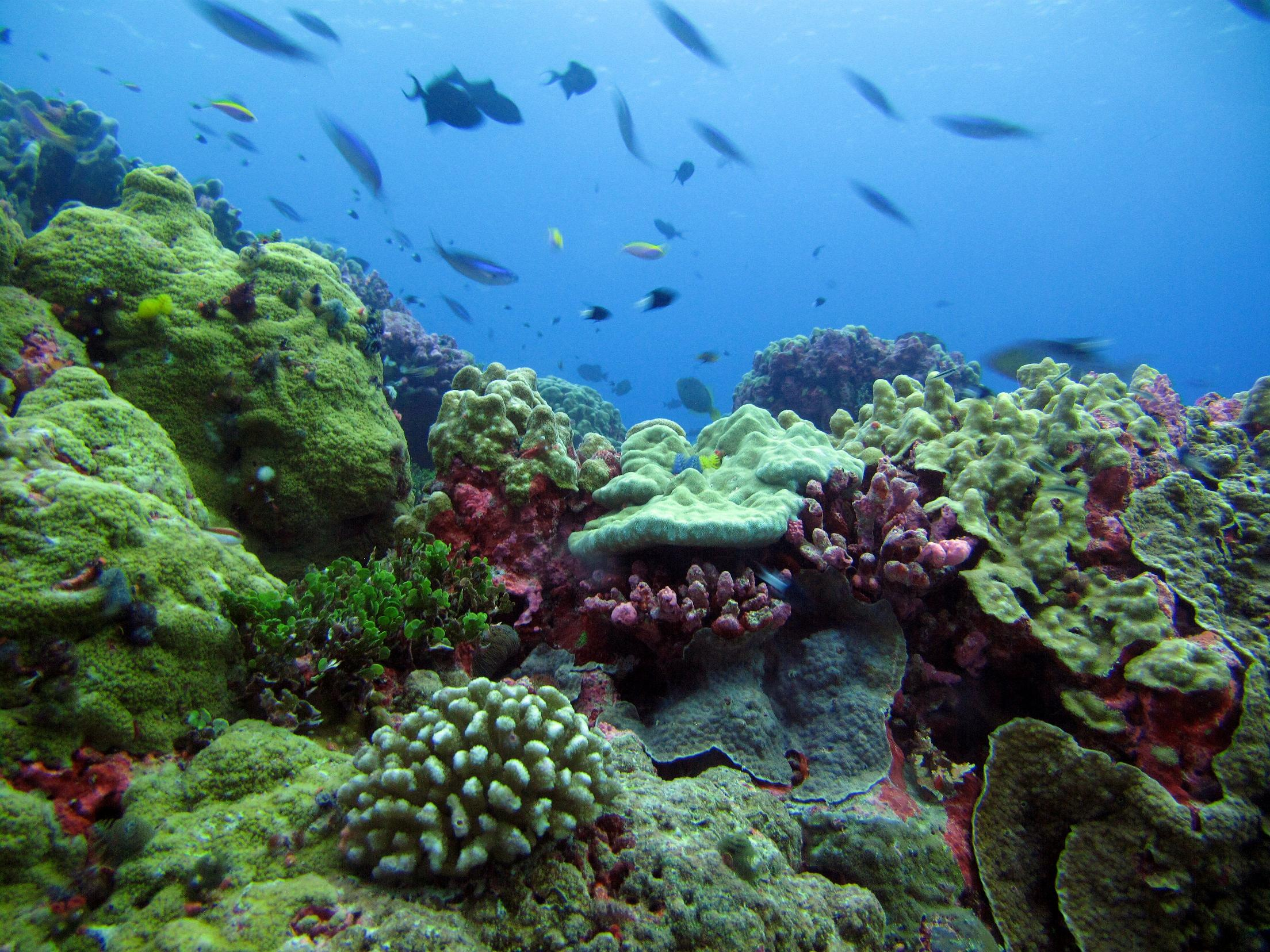
- Coral reefs at Enderbury, part of the Phoenix Islands Protected Area

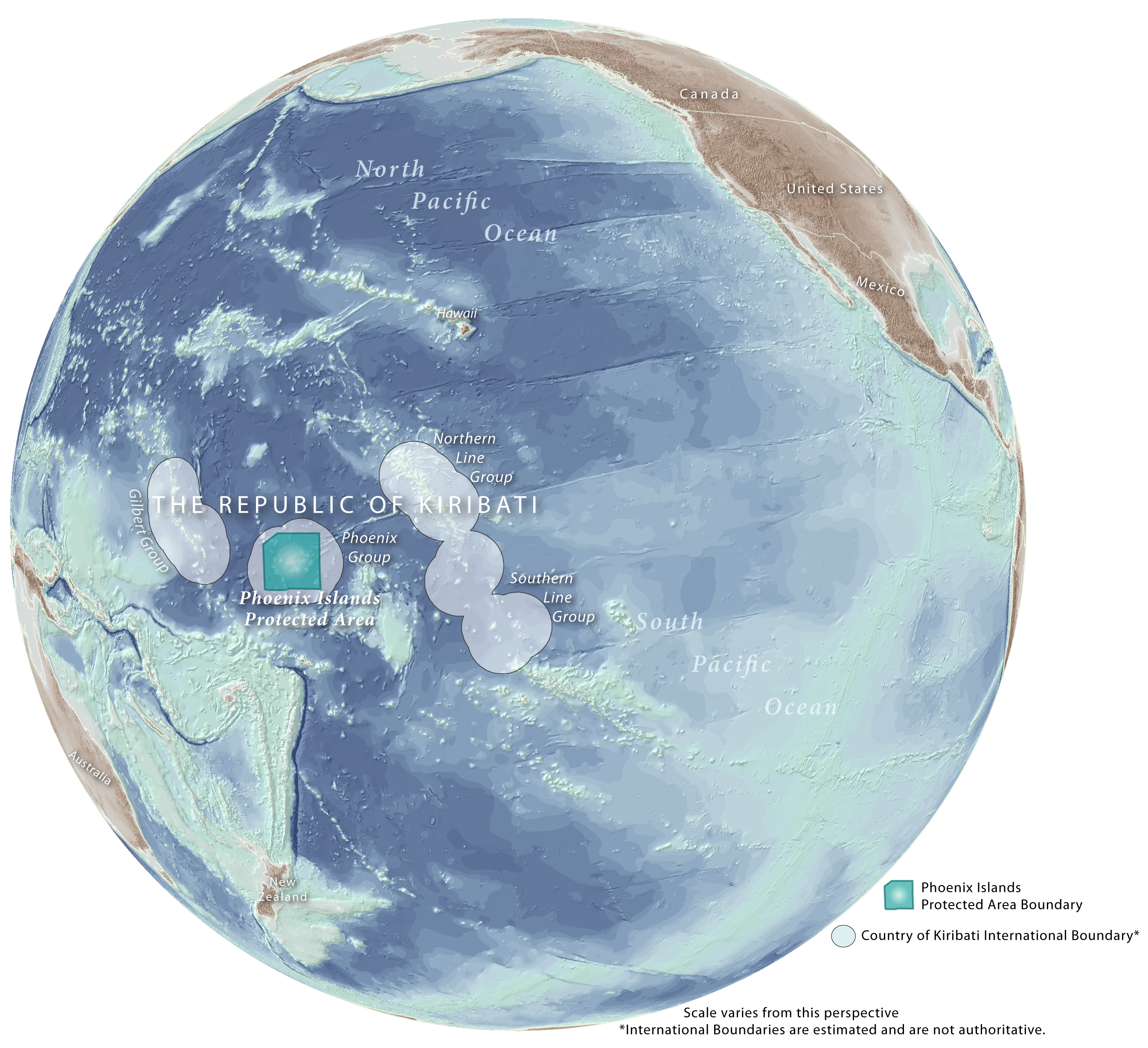
- Phoenix Islands Protected Area boundary outlined

Geography
- Location: Pacific Ocean
- Coordinates: 4°41′N 160°22′W to 11°25′S 151°49′W
- Archipelago: Gilbert Islands, Line Islands and Phoenix Islands
- Total islands: 32 atolls and 1 Raised coral atoll
- Major islands: Banaba
- Highest elevation: 81 m (266 ft)
- Highest point: Unnamed location on Banaba

Administration
- Kiribati

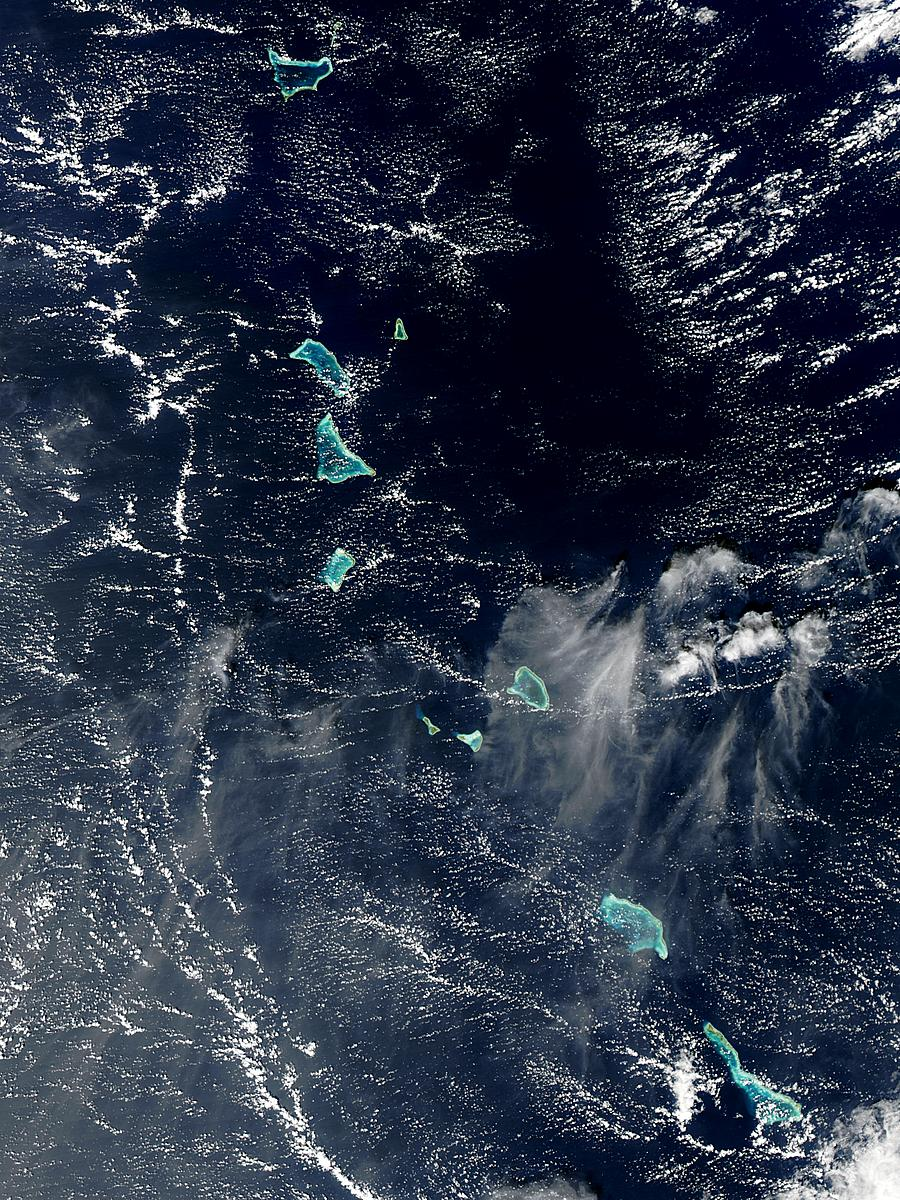
Kiribati's Gilbert Islands

The Coral reefs of Kiribati consists of 32 atolls and one raised coral island, Banaba (Ocean Island), which is an isolated island between Nauru and the Gilbert Islands. The islands of Kiribati are dispersed over 3.5 million km^{2} (1.4 million sq mi) of the Pacific Ocean and straddle the equator and the 180th meridian, extending into the eastern and western hemispheres, as well as the northern and southern hemispheres. 21 of the 33 islands are inhabited. The groups of islands of Kiribati are:

- Gilbert Islands: 16 atolls located some 1,500 kilometres (932 mi) north of Fiji.
- Phoenix Islands: 8 atolls and coral islands located some 1,800 kilometres (1,118 mi) southeast of the Gilberts.
- Line Islands: 8 atolls and one reef, located about 3,300 kilometres (2,051 mi) east of the Gilberts.

The recognizable reef systems in these archipelagos are: 3 reef communities or submerged reefs; 15 fringing reefs; and 18 atolls. In the Line Islands archipelago, Kingman Reef, Jarvis Island and Palmyra Atoll are U.S. territories that are administered as part of the United States Minor Outlying Islands, although they are geographically part of the Line Islands archipelago. Kingman Reef, Jarvis Island and Palmyra Atoll are part of the Pacific Islands Heritage Marine National Monument.

The reefs in the Gilbert Islands are exposed to the effects of pollution and over-utilisation of the reef resources by the residents of the islands, which is similar to the threats to the Coral reefs of Tuvalu, which are to the south east of the Gilbert Islands. In contrast, most of atolls of the Phoenix Islands and Line Islands are uninhabited.

The isolation of the Phoenix Islands, most of which are uninhabited, means they are among the most pristine coral reefs on Earth.

== Areas of high biodiversity and conservation value ==
=== Key Biodiversity Areas ===
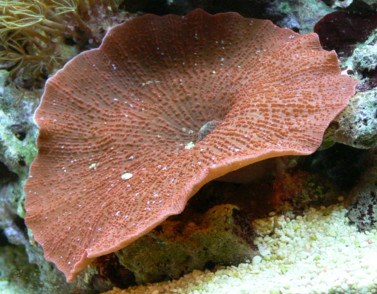
Corallimorpharia

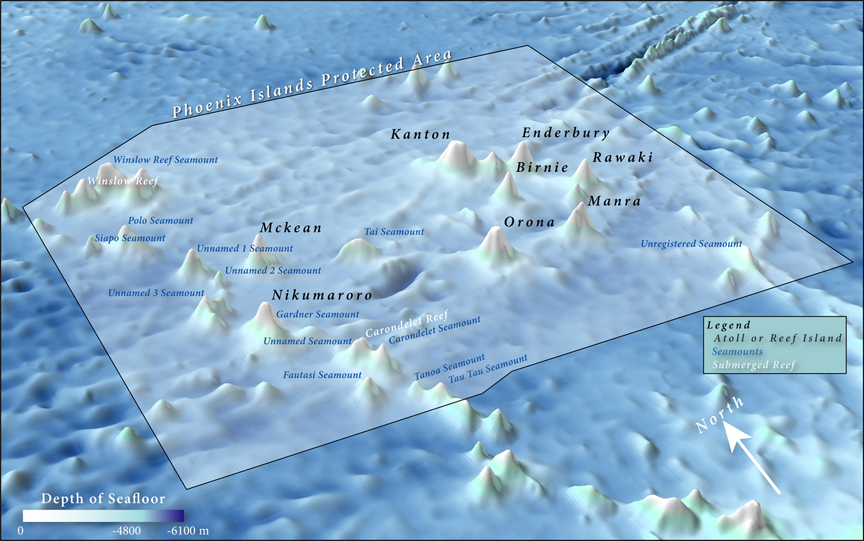
The Phoenix Islands Protected Area is a mostly uninhabited coral archipelago located within a globally biologically important area called the Polynesian/Micronesian hotspot

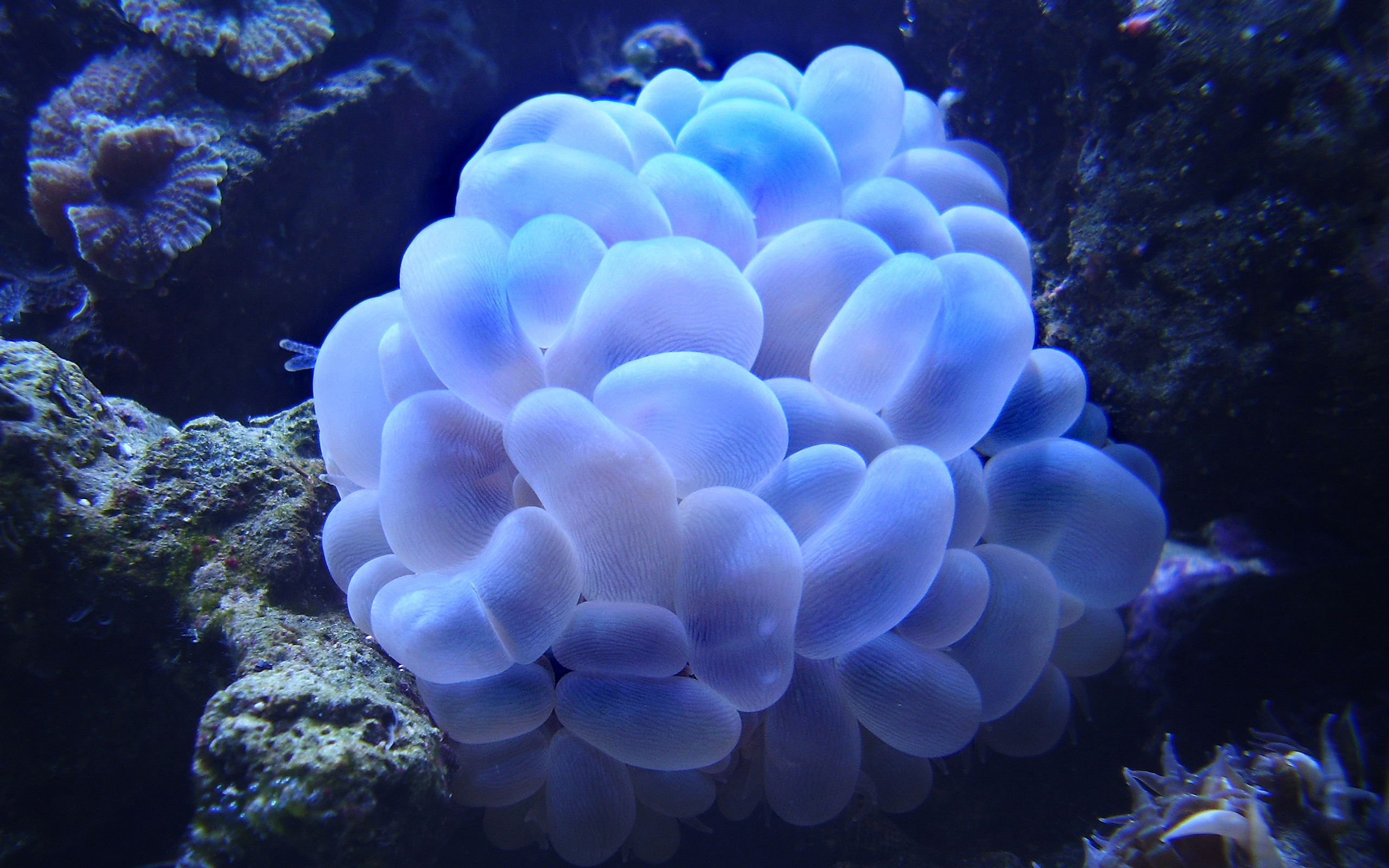
Plerogyra sinuosa

A total of 22 Key Biodiversity Areas (KBAs) - areas of high biodiversity and conservation value - have been identified in Kiribati, with the KBAs encompassing both marine and terrestrial systems (such as bird nesting or feeding environments). The 22 identified KBAs cover an approximate total area of 4 thousand km^{2} (1.5 thousand sq mi) or approximately 74% of the total land, lagoon and reef habitat of Kiribati. As of 2013, 12 of the 22 KBAs have been completely or partially established as conservation areas by the government of Kiribati or by local village communities.

The North Tarawa Conservation Area includes marine zones.

Four marine reserves were specifically set aside for the conservation of grouper. These are all located in the Gilbert Islands on the atolls of Butaritari, Tabiteuea, Nonouti, and Onotoa and are managed by the Fisheries Division.

=== Phoenix Islands Protected Area ===
The 2006 declaration of the Phoenix Islands Protected Area (PIPA), with a size of 408,250 km^{2} (157,630 sq mi), created, at that time, the world's largest designated marine protected area (MPA), which was also designated as the world's largest and deepest UNESCO World Heritage Site in 2010. The U.S. administered Pacific Islands Heritage Marine National Monument is currently the world's largest designated MPA, and is to the north and north-east of the PIPA.

The PIPA constitutes 11.34% of Kiribati's Exclusive Economic Zone (EEZ). The PIPA conserves one of the world's largest intact oceanic coral archipelago ecosystems, includes 14 known underwater seamounts (presumed to be extinct volcanoes) and other deep-sea habitats. The area contains approximately 800 known species of fauna, including about 200 coral species, 500 fish species, 18 marine mammals and 44 bird species. In total it is equivalent to the size of the state of California in the U.S., though the total land area is only 25 km^{2} (9.7 sq mi).

There are three atolls with associated lagoons and perimeter coral reefs in the PIPA, Orona (Hull), Nikumaroro (Gardner), and Canton Island (Abariringa), and five low islands surrounded by fringing reefs, Manra (Sydney), Rawaki (Phoenix), McKean, Birnie and Enderbury, and also two submerged reefs, Winslow and Carondelet. The area contains seven main habitats: island, lagoon, coral reef, deep reef, seamount, deep benthos, and open ocean, which are all represented within PIPA and the Kanton Island protection zone.

In the PIPA Management Plan 2015–2020, which was implemented following a Kiribati government decision in January 2014, there is a total ban on commercial fishing within the PIPA boundaries extending to the limits of the Territorial Sea (to 12 nm) and in all lagoons of the 8 PIPA islands, (Canton, Manra, Rawaki, Birnie, Mckean, Enderbury, Nikumaroro and Orona) to ensure there is no impact to marine and terrestrial species including habitats.

Two submerged reefs, Winslow and Carondelet, and at least 14 known seamounts together with open ocean and deep-sea habitat are an integral part of the Phoenix Islands Protected Area. The New England Aquarium (NEAq) and Woods Hole Oceanographic Institution have carried out scientific research expeditions of these seamount habitats, which have been identified being rich in deep-water coral and biodiversity supporting a variety of oceanic pelagic species. PIPA has been identified as an important feeding and spawning site for species of tuna. The dominant taxonomic group across all depths were the octocorals, followed by antipatharians, scleractinians, and then zoantharians.

As of 2015, Canton Island had a population of 20, down from 61 in 2000. Because it is inhabited, management of Canton Island is described in the Canton Resource Use Sustainability Plan (KRUSP), which covers a 12 nm radius around the atoll. Over 50% of the island and lagoon are protected in a conservation zone.

== Structure of the reefs of Kiribati ==
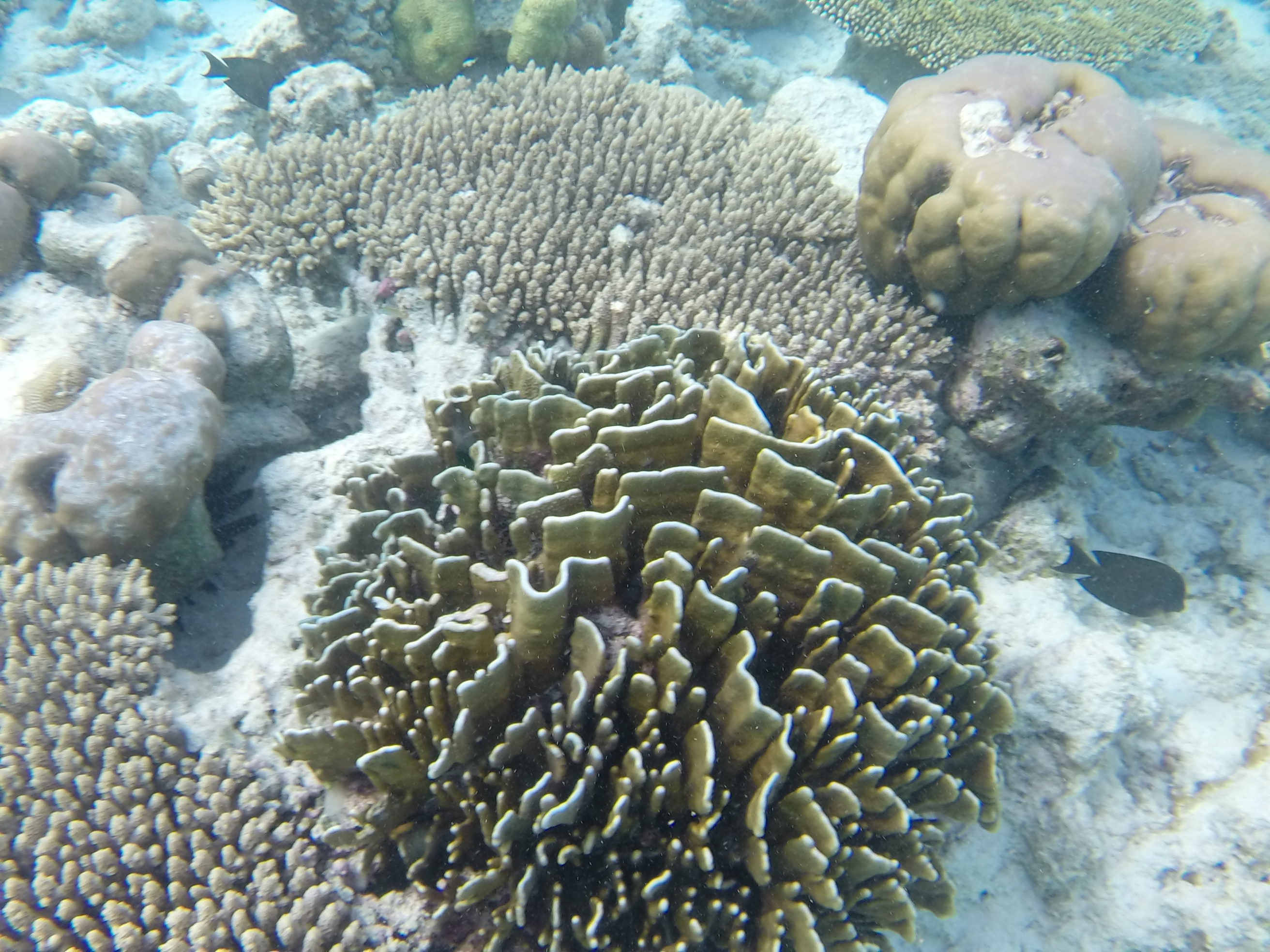
Blue coral (Heliopora coerulea)

The coral atolls and reef islands of Kiribati have been formed from oceanic volcanos, with a coral reef growing around the shore of the volcano and then, over several million years, the volcano becomes extinct, eroded and subsided completely beneath the surface of the ocean. The reef and the small coral islets on top of it are all that is left of the original island, and a lagoon has taken the place of the former volcano. For the atoll to persist, the coral reef must be maintained at the sea surface, with coral growth matching any relative change in sea level (subsidence of the island or rising oceans). On the atolls, an annular reef rim surrounds the lagoon, and may include natural reef channels.

Banaba is an elevated limestone cap surrounded by a fringing reef. The low islands of Makin, Tamana, Arorae, Enderbury, Flint and Vostok Island all lack lagoons but have a fringing reef.

== State of the reefs of Kiribati ==
=== Gilbert Islands ===
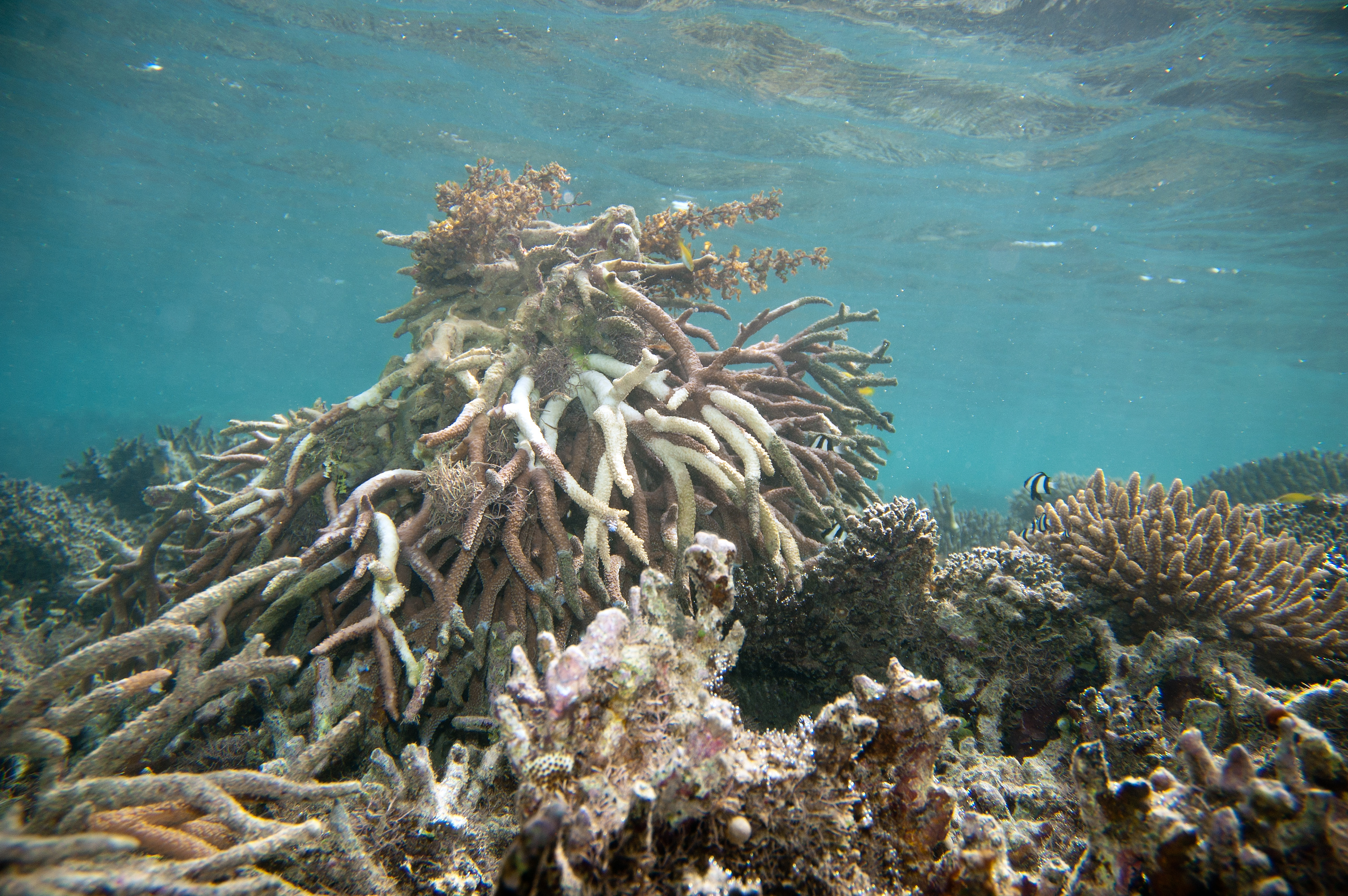
Acropora muricata

The reef environment of Kiribati includes approximately 200 species of corals and about 1,000 species of shellfish. The species of shellfish include the black-lipped pearl oyster (Pinctada margaritifera) and Anadara cockles (Anadara uropigimelana), and also the strombid gastropod (Strombus luhuanus).

In the Central Gilbert Islands atolls of Abaiang, Abemama and Maiana, 3 species of giant clam (Tridacna) occur: Tridacna squamosa; Tridacna maxima; and Hippopus hippopus), although the stocks of the giant clam have been largely exhausted.

Blue coral (Heliopora coerulea) is abundant on the reefs of the Gilbert Islands, such as on Tarawa although it is rarer on the windward reefs, in contrast to the more protected seaward reefs. Blue coral is absent from the Phoenix Islands and the Line Islands. On the reefs of Tarawa the dominant species are Acropora muricata and Acropora hyacinthus, with extensive patches of Corallimorpharia and Porites rus along the southern seaward reef slope, large colonies of Plerogyra sinuosa are also present. The coral reef environment of Abaiang in the Northern Gilbert Islands includes: the occasional stand of Acropora (staghorn and table corals) and massive Porites rus; and on the western seaward reef of Abaiang are blue coral (Heliopora coerulea) and colonies of Porites cylindrica; with mixed species of Halimeda sp. (green macroalgae).

=== Phoenix Islands ===
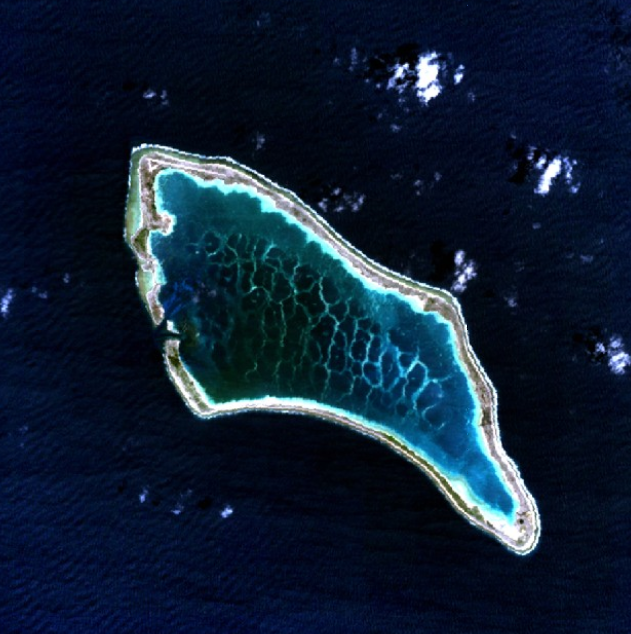
Kanton Island, visible color satellite image

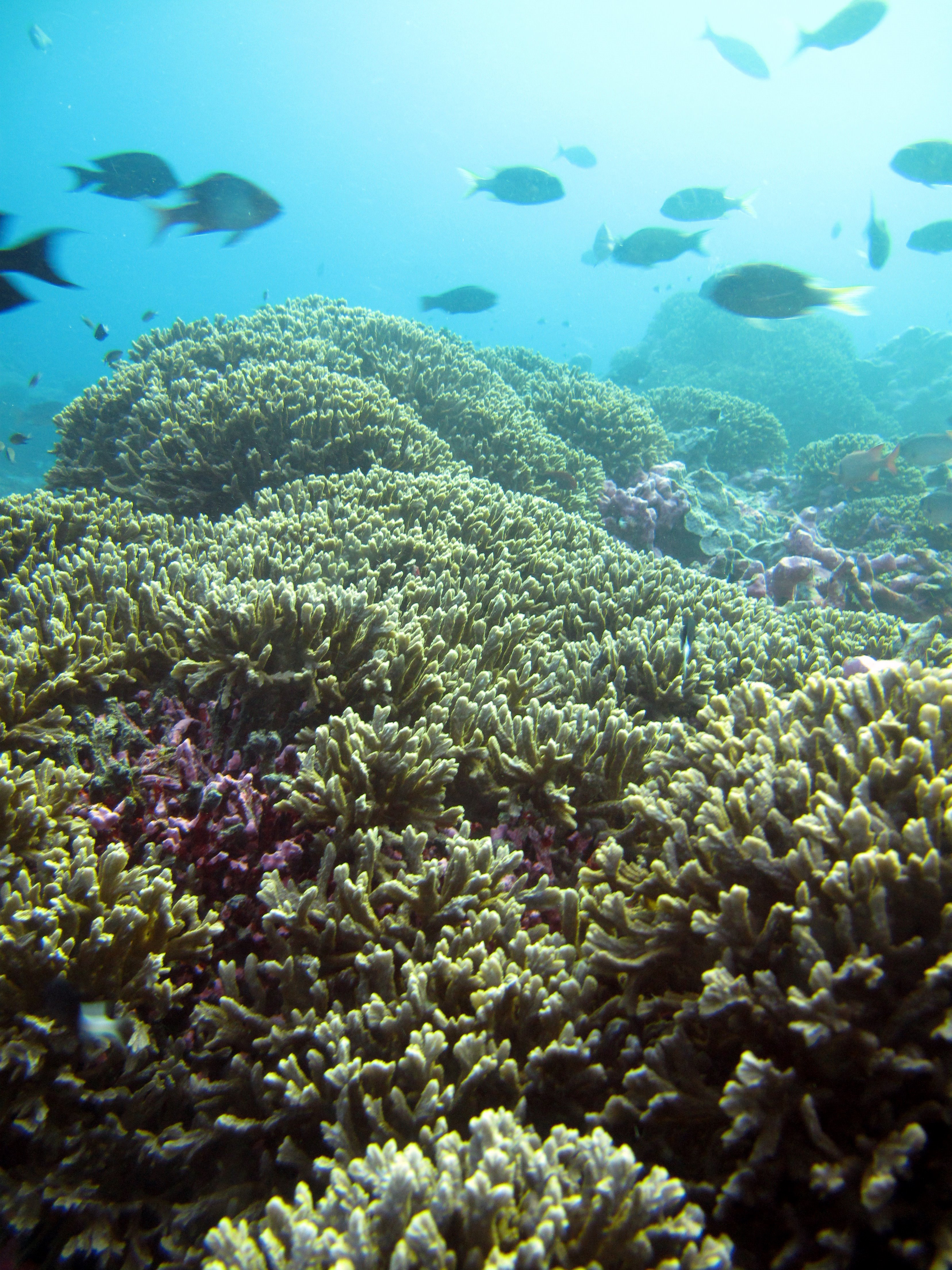
Hydnophora rigida corals on Kanton, part of the Phoenix Islands Protected Area

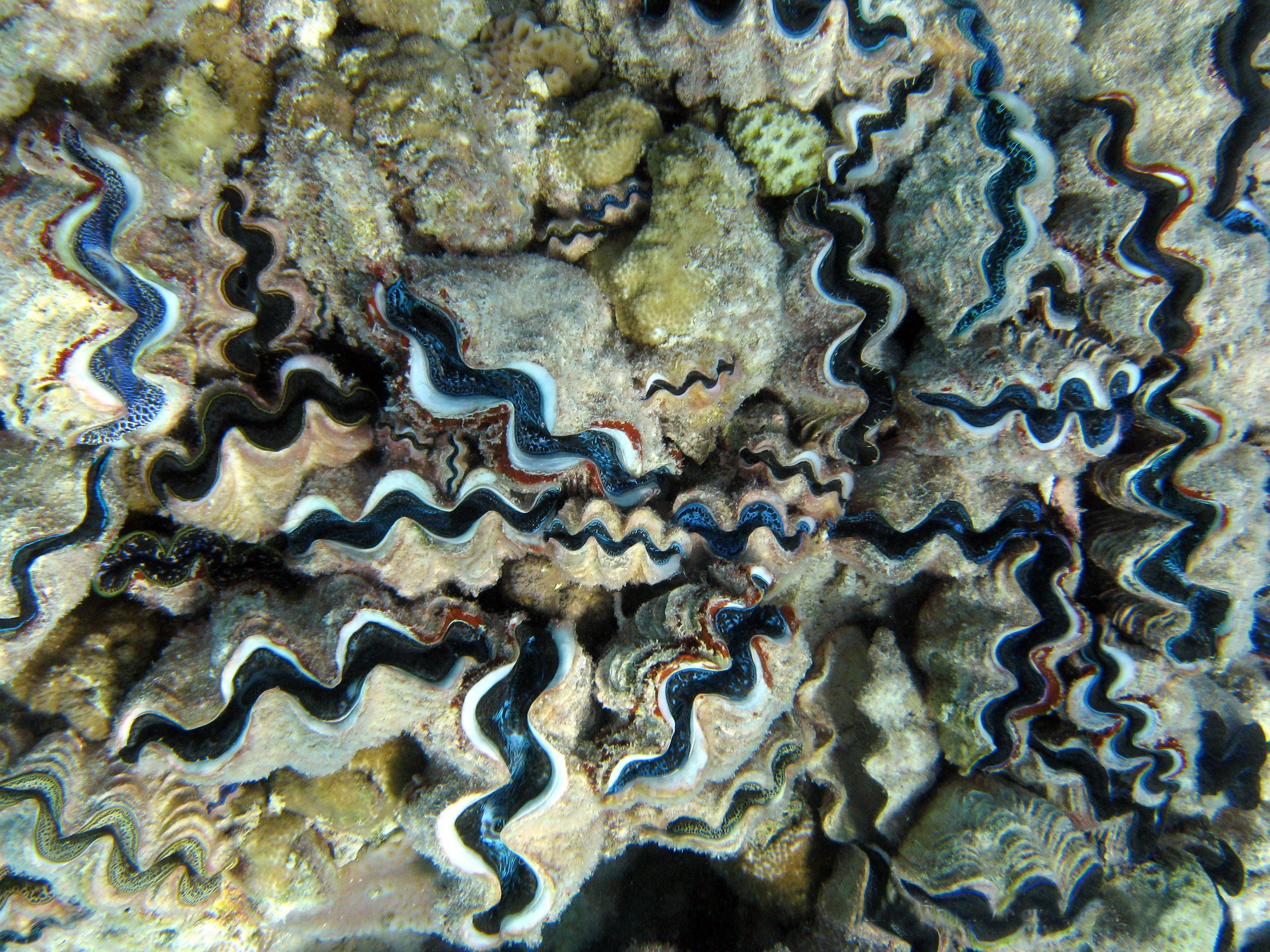
Tridacna giant clams in the lagoon of Orona

The 2000 surveys identify that, at the time of these surveys, the reefs were in an excellent state of health, and free from the bleaching that has plagued reefs in other parts of the Pacific with no evidence of any coral diseases.

The coral reefs of the Phoenix Islands were notable for their moderate Live Coral Cover (LCC) of 20-40% and evidence of high physical breakage of coral by wave energy on the southern, eastern and northern reefs of the islands (the windward sides), which create coral rubble in the lagoons and base of the reefs. The dominant bottom cover of the lagoons was hard coral (36.0%), followed by coralline algae (red algae) (18.0%), coral rubble (16.7%), turf and fleshy algae (11.6%) and Halimeda (green macroalgae) (10.4%). The dominance of coral and coralline algae indicates healthy reef ecosystems dominated by calcifying organisms and active reef framework growth.

The effect of exposure to storms is indicated by the dominance trends with storm resistant encrusting/submassive forms in windward sites, its somewhat lower abundance at leeward sites and a corresponding increase in more delicate plate forms, and the dominance of the more fragile table and staghorn corals in protected lagoon sites. Coral species diversity is higher on the larger islands of Nikumaroro, Kanton and Orona, which indicates the importance of the larger area of reef on these islands for support of biodiversity. Carpeting soft corals (Sinularia and Lobophytum) were found at the bottom of the lagoons of Kanton and Orona, which are the only true lagoons in the Phoenix Islands.

Crown-of-thorns starfish (Acanthaster planci), cushion star and other coral predators, such as the corallivorous snail Drupella spp., are found on the reefs of the Phoenix Islands, although there has not been any indication of destructive outbreaks of those predators on the reefs.

Species of giant clam (Tridacna) occur in low numbers: Tridacna squamosa, Tridacna maxima, but not Tridacna gigas.

The 2000 surveys identified the following coral species as being the most abundant coral species at the specific sites on each atoll that was surveyed:

Genus:	Species:	Abundant on reefs at:	
Acropora	Acropora cytherea Acropora lovelli	Kanton, Nikumaroro, Orona	Acropora cytherea
Montipora	Montipora efflorescens	Kanton, Nikumaroro, Rawaki, Orona	
Favites	Favites pentagona	Nikumaroro, Manra	Favites pentagona
Echinopora	Echinopora lamellosa	Kanton, Manra, Orona	
Leptastrea	Leptastrea purpurea	Kanton, Nikumaroro, Enderbury, Rawaki, Orona	
Pocillopora	Pocillopora verrucosa	Kanton, Nikumaroro, Enderbury	Pocillopora verrucosa
Pocillopora	Pocillopora grandis	Rawaki	Pocillopora grandis
Pavona	Pavona maldivensis Pavona minuta Pavona varians Pavona clavus	Kanton, Nikumaroro, Enderbury, Rawaki, Orona	Pavona maldivensis
Goniastrea	Goniastrea stelligera Goniastrea edwardsi	Kanton, Enderbury, Rawaki, Manra, Orona	Goniastrea stelligera
Porites	Porites lutea	Enderbury, Rawaki	Porites lutea
Cyphastrea	Cyphastrea chalcidicum	Rawaki, Manra, Orona	
Herpolitha	Herpolitha limax	Manra	
Fungia	Fungia danai Fungia fungites Fungia scutaria	Manra	
Oxypora	Oxypora lacera	Nikumaroro	Oxypora lacera
Hydnophora	Hydnophora rigida	Kanton	Hydnophora rigida
Millepora (hydrocorals)	Millepora platyphylla	Kanton	

=== Line Islands ===
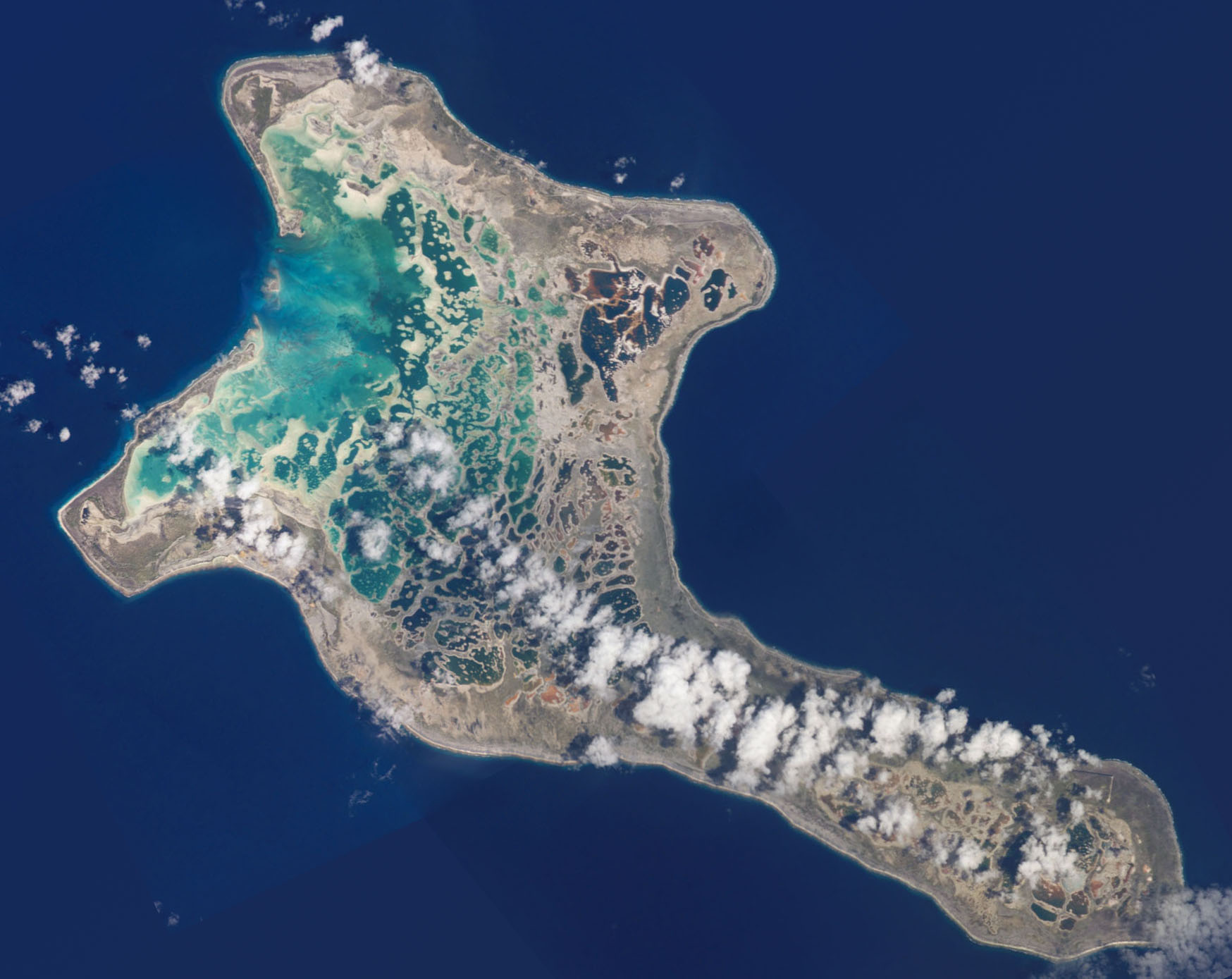
The atoll of Kiritimati (Christmas Island), Northern Line Islands

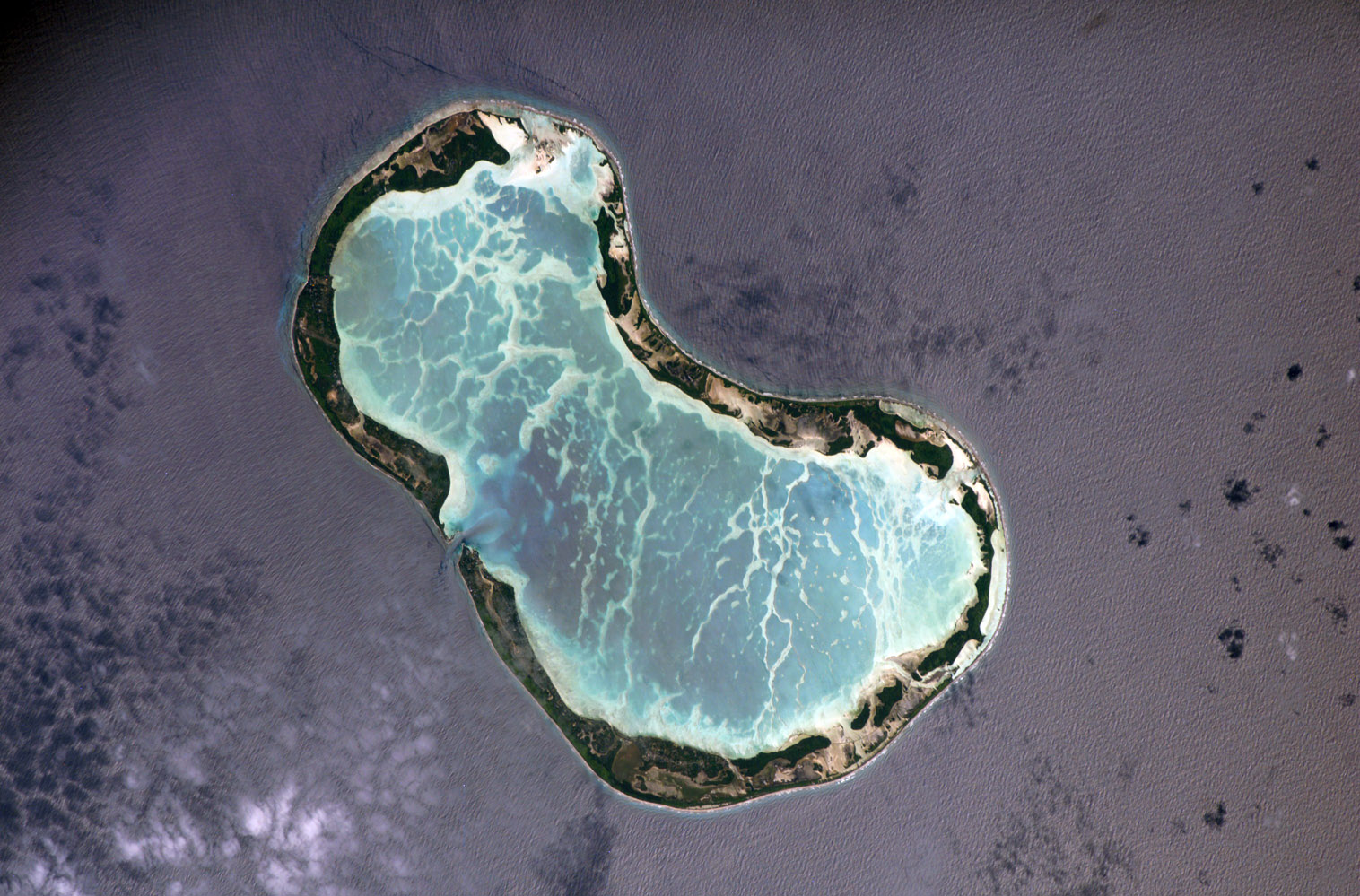
NASA image of Tabuaeran, Northern Line Islands

Kiritimati (Christmas Island) in the Line Islands has the greatest land area of any coral atoll in the world, at about 388 square kilometres (150 square miles). The atoll is about 150 km (93 mi) in perimeter, while the lagoon shoreline extends for over 48 km (30 mi). The entire island is a Wildlife Sanctuary.

Surveys of the Northern Line Islands in 2007 identified a shifted from domination by reef-building stony corals and coralline algae (red algae) at Kingman Reef and Palmyra Atoll (both are U.S. territory), to domination by macroalgae (including species of Halimeda (green macroalgae), Caulerpa, Avrainvillea, Dictyosphaeria and Lobophora) and algal turfs at Tabuaeran and especially Kiritimati (both are part of Kiribati). Coral density tracked coral cover and was highest at Kingman Reef and lowest at Kiritimati.

Stony corals plus coralline algae strongly dominated the reefs at Kingman Reef (71% LCC) with numerous large coral colonies (primarily table and branching Acropora spp.). Cover of stony corals plus coralline algae dropped to 48% LCC at Palmyra, 38% LCC at Tabuaeran, and 21% LCC at Kiritimati. The types of coral were much more variable at Tabuaeran than the other atolls. Some sites on the reefs at Tabuaeran were dominated by coralline algae and Acropora corals (maximum 63% combined cover), whereas other sites were dominated by fleshy algae (79% combined cover of turf and macro-algae). However, turf algae were the most common group overall (36% cover), whereas dead corals carpeted by turf and macroalgae more uniformly dominated the reefs at Kiritimati (68% mean combined cover). The numbers of juvenile colonies 1 cm (0.39 in) to 5 cm (2.0 in) of Acropora, Pocillopora and Fungiidae corals, were more than 6 times higher at Kingman Reef and Palmyra than at Tabuaeran and Kiritimati.

Giant clams (Tridacna) were also more abundant at Kingman Reef than elsewhere in the Line Islands. Clams are harvested for consumption at Kiritimati.

Some coral species that remain at risk in Kiribati due to the gaps in the protection of Key Biodiversity Areas include: Acropora echinata (procumbens), Acropora vaughani, Alveopora verrilliana, and Montipora patula, all recorded only on Tabuaeran in the Line Islands.

== Bleaching ==
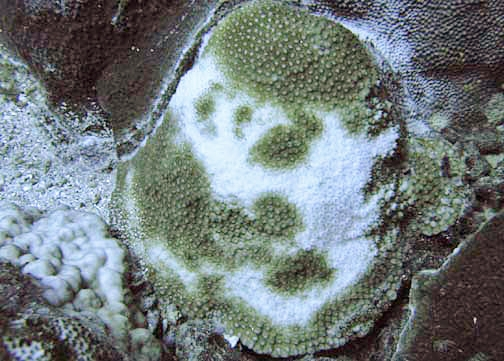
Partially bleached colony of Goniastrea stelligera

There has been bleaching of the (Acropora spp.) staghorn branching corals and other corals on the reefs of Kiribati. Bleaching is a process that expels the photosynthetic algae from the corals' "stomachs" or polyps. This algae is called zooxanthellae. It is vital to the reef's life because it provides the coral with nutrients; it is also responsible for the color. The process is called bleaching because when the algae is ejected from the coral reef the animal loses its pigment. Zooxanthella densities are continually changing; bleaching is an extreme example of what naturally happens.

The bleaching was a consequence of an increase in ocean temperatures that happened during the El Niño events that occurred between 2003 and 2004, including on the reefs of Kiritimati, the reefs of the Central Gilbert Islands and the Southern Gilbert Islands, and on reefs in the lagoon of Kanton, which is in the Phoenix Islands Protected Area. Research dives in 2009 and 2012 had shown little improvement in the coral colonies of the lagoon of Kanton. Then research dives in 2015 found abundant Acropora spp staghorn branching corals.

Survey data (2004–2012) of the El Niño-influenced coral reefs in the Central Gilbert and Southern Gilbert Islands allowed for the evaluate the drivers of coral community response to, and recovery from, multiple heat stress events. The results showed more limited bleaching during the 2009–2010 El Niño event, in contrast to a similar 2004–2005 event. This difference was correlated with incoming light and historical temperature variability, rather than heat stress. The researchers concluded there was growing resistance to bleaching-level heat stress among coral communities, due to the spread of "weedy" and temperature-tolerant species (such as Porites rus) and cloudy conditions during El Niño events.

== Impact of iron leaching from shipwrecks ==
The PIPA is in a naturally iron poor region. The introduction of iron oxides to this environment from the rusting shipwrecks and anchor gear, is linked to proliferation of turf algae and benthic bacterial communities, and degraded 'black reefs'. Monitoring from 2000 to 2015 recorded the black reef originating at the 1929 wreck of the SS Norwich City on Nikumaroro progressing northward to sites 1 kilometre (0.6 mi) away. The 2015 expedition to the PIPA recorded the presence of black reefs on five atolls (Kanton, Nikumaroro, McKean, Rawaki, Enderbury) and on Carondelet seamount associated with shipwreck debris. No recovery has been documented at black reefs observed between 2005 and 2015.

== Bibliography ==
- Edward R. Lovell, Taratau Kirata and Tooti Tekinaiti (September 2002). "Status report for Kiribati's coral reefs" (PDF). Centre IRD de Nouméa.
- Thomas, Frank R. (2003). "Kiribati: 'Some aspects of human ecology,' forty years later" (PDF). Atoll Research Bulletin. 501: 1–40. doi:10.5479/si.00775630.501.1.
