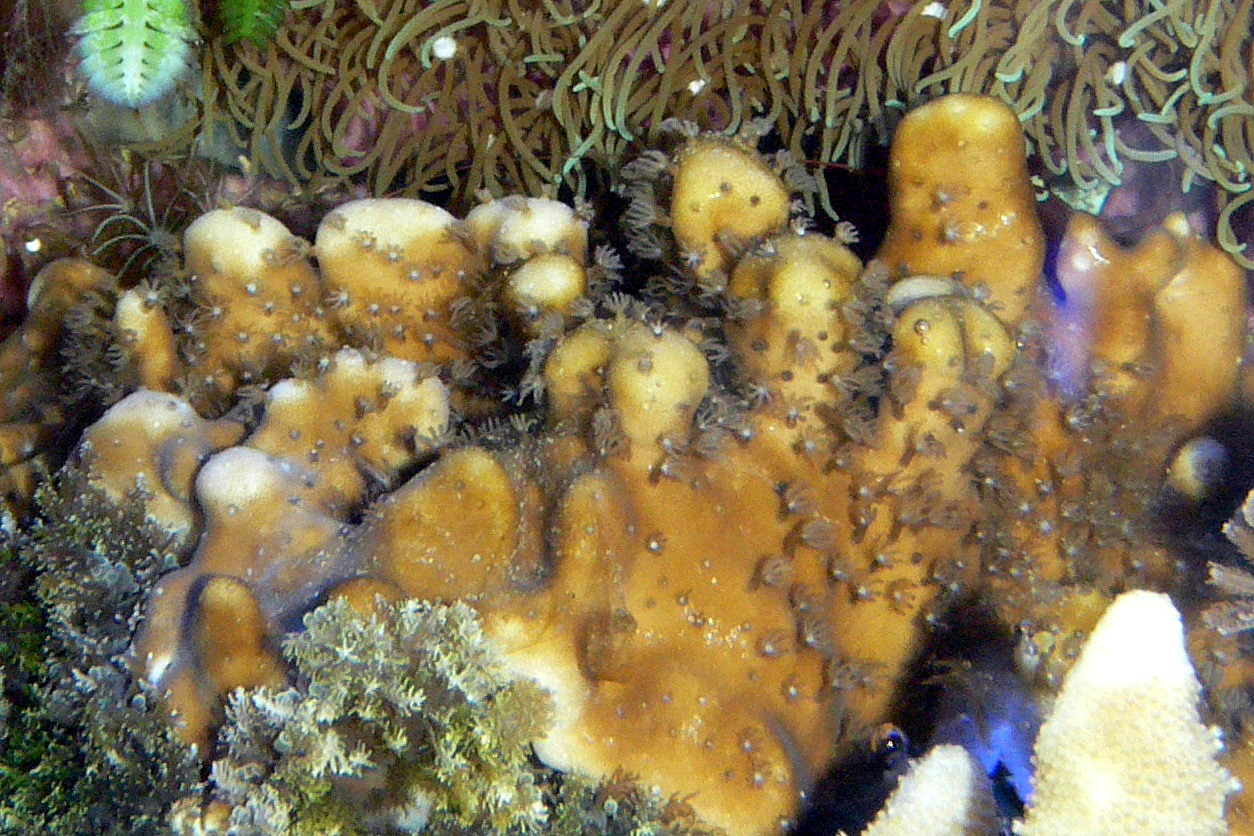
- Blue coral (Heliopora coerulea)

Scientific classification
- Kingdom: Animalia
- Phylum: Cnidaria
- Subphylum: Anthozoa
- Class: Octocorallia
- Order: Helioporacea; Bock, 1938

Families
- Helioporidae Moseley, 1876; Lithotelestidae Bayer & Muzik, 1977

Synonyms
- Coenothecalia Bourne, 1895; Helioporoidea Bock, 1938; Helioporaria Stiasny, 1939

= Helioporacea =

Order of octocorals that forms massive calcareous skeletons

Helioporacea is an order of the subclass Octocorallia that forms massive lobed crystalline calcareous skeletons in colonial corals. These corals first appeared in the Cretaceous period. It consists of two families, Helioporidae Moseley, 1876 and Lithotelestidae Bayer & Muzik, 1977.

The blue coral (Heliopora coerulea), the only extant species in the family Helioporidae, is most common in shallow water of the tropical Pacific and Indo-Pacific reefs. It has no spicules, and is the only octocoral known to produce a massive skeleton formed of fibrocrystalline aragonite fused into lamellae, similar to that of the Scleractinia (stony corals). They form large colonies that can exceed a meter in diameter. They are composed of vertical branches, or folia.

The surface of blue coral and similar species appears smooth and the color in life is a distinctive grey-brown with white tips. The entire skeleton, however, has an unusual blue color and therefore the species is commonly exploited for decorative uses. The blue color of the skeleton (which is covered with a layer of brown polyps) is caused by iron salts. Blue coral can be used in tropical aquaria, and the crystalline calcareous fibres in the skeletons can be used for jewelry.

Individual polyps have eight feathery tentacles and, in the gastrovascular cavity, eight septa, or partitions. Cilia (tiny hairlike projections) on six septa draw water into the cavity. Cilia on the other two septa expel water. The skeleton consists of spicules that form a protective cup around each polyp.
