= Protected areas of Kiribati =

Protected areas in Kiribati

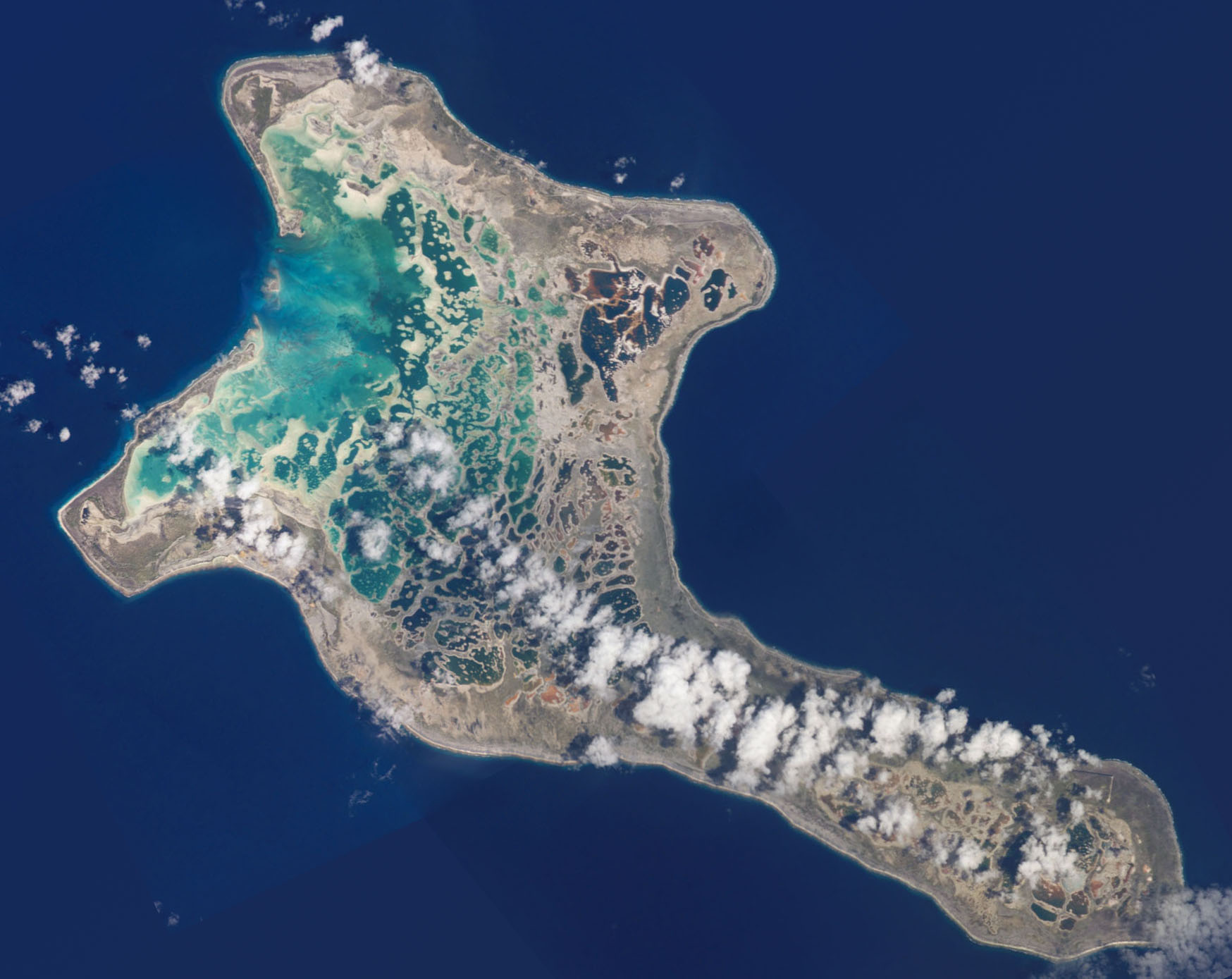
Kiritimati from the International Space Station

Protected areas of Kiribati include marine protected areas managed by the Environment and Conservation Division, of the Kiribati Ministry of Environment, Lands and Agricultural Development. Kiribati, in partnership with the New England Aquarium and Conservation International (CI), manages the Phoenix Islands Protected Area (PIPA), which is a World Heritage Site that was established in 2006, and is the second largest of the world's marine protected areas. The U.S. administered Pacific Islands Heritage Marine National Monument is currently the world's largest designated marine protected area (MPA), and is to the north and north-east of the PIPA.

There is one wetland of international importance that is registered under the Ramsar Convention. A total of 22 Key Biodiversity Areas (KBAs) - areas of high biodiversity and conservation value - have been identified in Kiribati.

== Protected areas ==
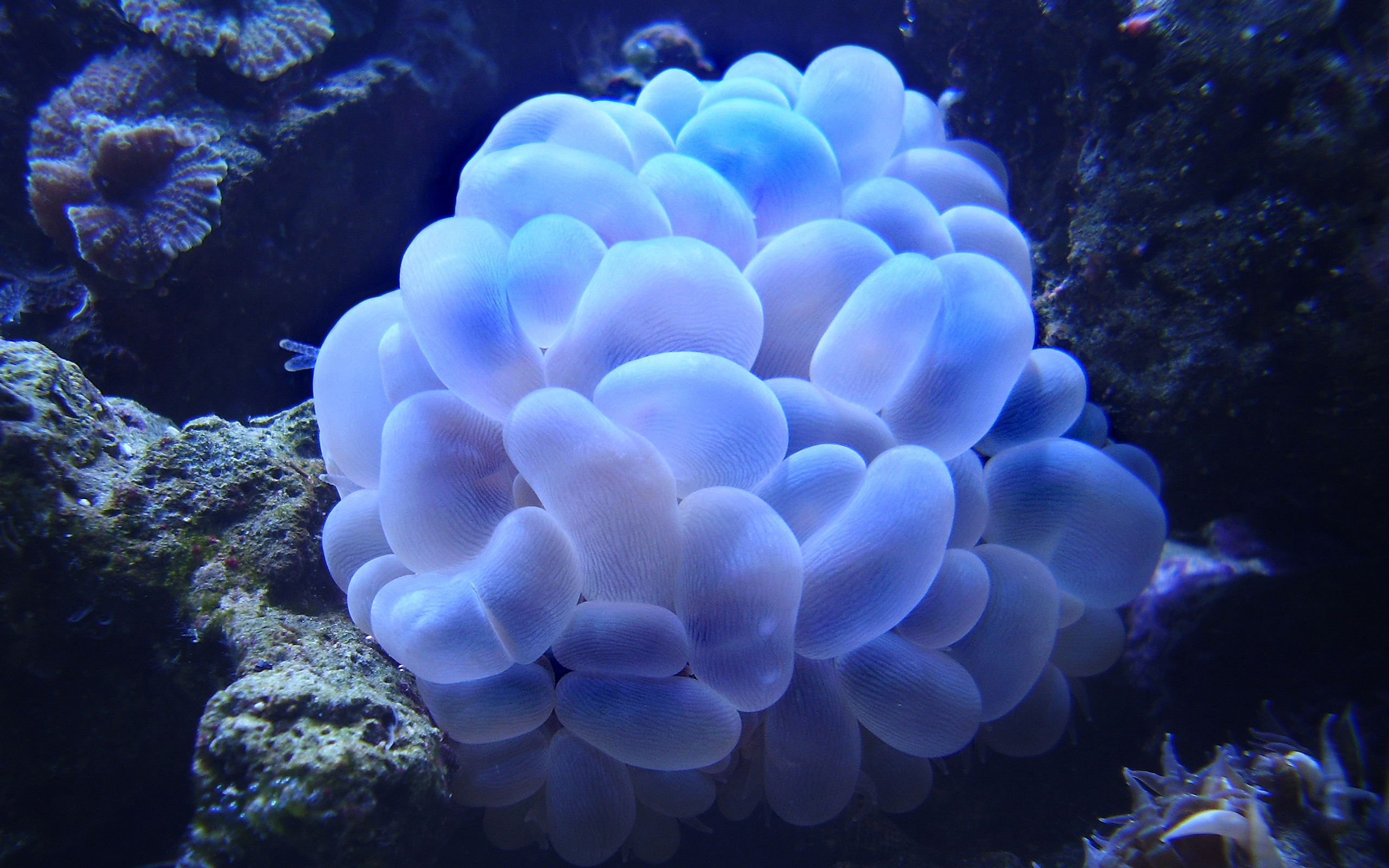
Plerogyra sinuosa

In December 1960, the British colonial authority gazetted Kiritimati as a bird sanctuary under the "Gilbert and Ellice Island Colony Wild Birds Protection Ordinance" of 1938. Access to Cook Island, Motu Tabu, and Motu Upua was restricted. Kiritimati was declared a wildlife sanctuary in May 1975, in accordance with the Wildlife Conservation Ordinance of the then self-governing colony. Ngaontetaake islet and the sooty tern breeding grounds at North West Point also became restricted-access zones.

The World Database on Protected Areas (WDPA) identifies the following Marine Protected Areas in Kiribati:

- Phoenix Islands Protected Area 397,447 km^{2} (153,455 sq mi), is a World Heritage Site (natural or mixed).
- Kiritimati Atoll (Christmas Island); 523.7 km^{2} (202.2 sq mi), is a Marine Protected Area - Multiple Use Conservation Area, which includes:

- Cook Islet Closed Area (Kiritimati WS), 22 km^{2} (8.5 sq mi), is a Bird Reserve.
- Motu Tabu Islet Closed Area (Kiritimati), 0.04 km^{2} (0.015 sq mi), is a Marine Protected Area - Closed Area.
- Motu Upua Closed Area (Kiritimati), 0.19 km^{2} (0.073 sq mi), is a Marine Protected Area - Closed Area.
- Ngaontetaake Islet Closed Area (Kiritimati), 0.26 km^{2} (0.10 sq mi), is a Marine Protected Area - Closed Area.
- North-west Point Closed Area (Kiritimati), 0.13 km^{2} (0.050 sq mi), is a Marine Protected Area - Closed Area.

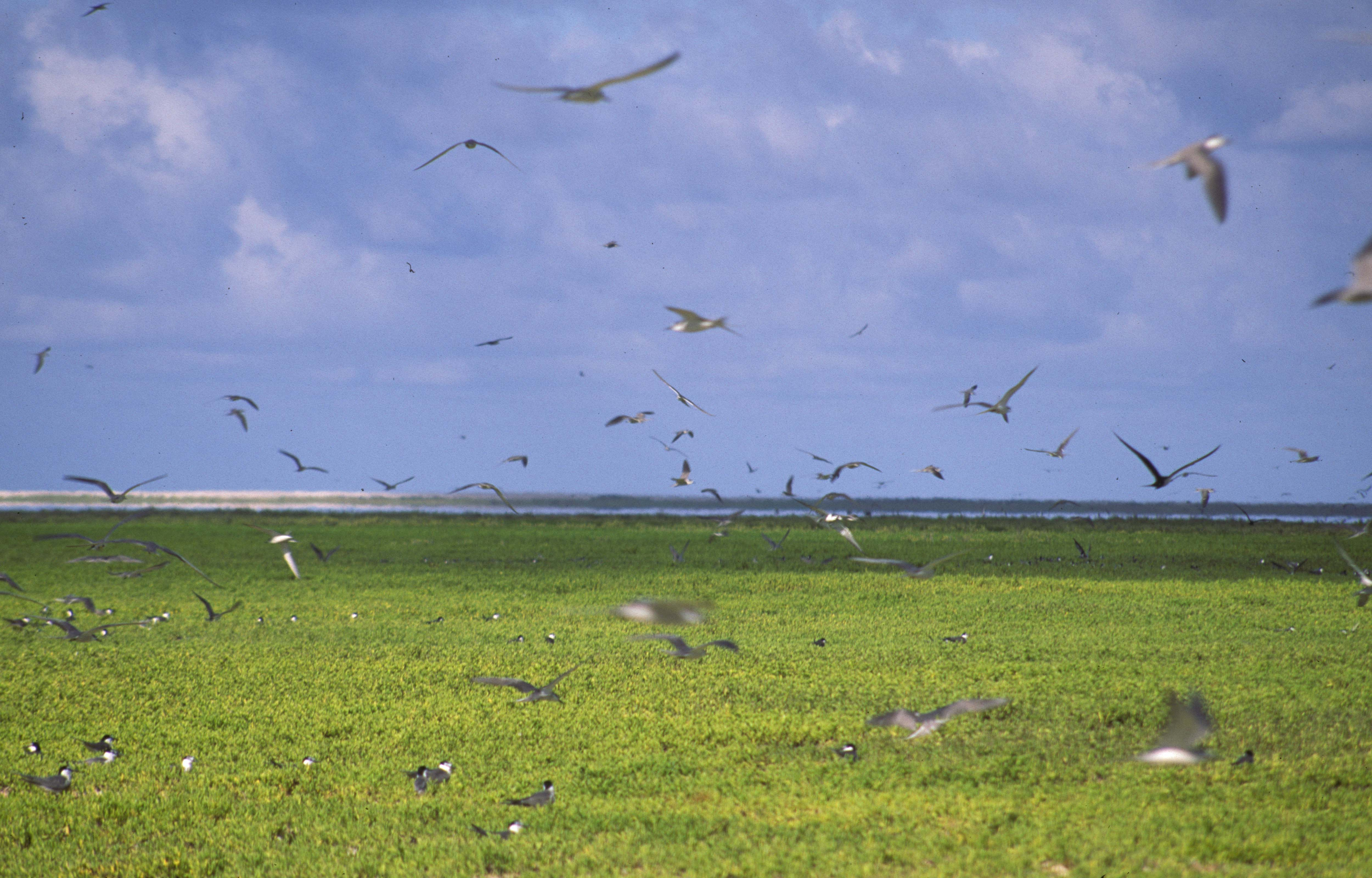
Grey-backed terns flying over Malden Island with lagoon in background

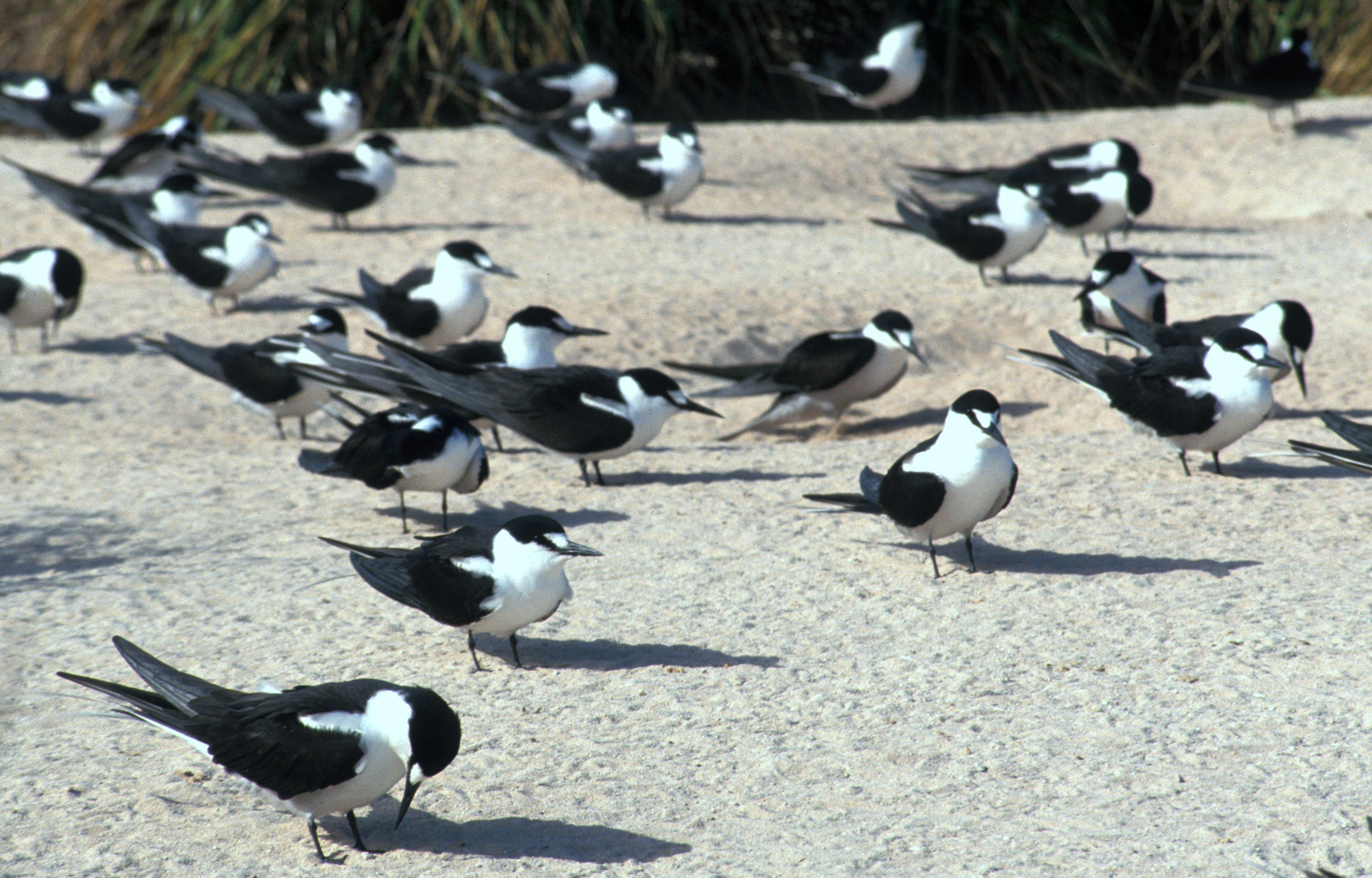
Sooty tern colony on Starbuck Island

- Malden Island (Closed Area), 39.3 km^{2} (15.2 sq mi), is a Terrestrial and Inland Waters Protected Area - Wildlife Sanctuary.
- Starbuck Island (Closed Area), 162 km^{2} (63 sq mi), is a Terrestrial and Inland Waters Protected Area - Wildlife Sanctuary.
- Vostok Island, 0.24 km^{2} (0.093 sq mi), is a Terrestrial and Inland Waters Protected Area - Wildlife Sanctuary.
- Bonriki Island Water Reserve, is a Marine Reserve that is adjacent to the Bonriki International Airport on Bonriki Islet of Tarawa.
- Nooto - North Tarawa Conservation Area, 10.33 km^{2} (3.99 sq mi), is Ramsar Site - Wetland of International Importance. This Conservation Area includes marine zones.

Four marine reserves were specifically set aside for the conservation of grouper. These are all located in the Gilbert Islands off the atolls of Butaritari, Tabiteuea, Nonouti, and Onotoa and are managed by the Kiribati Fisheries Division.

=== World Heritage listed areas ===
As of April 2024, the Phoenix Islands Protected Area (PIPA) is the only area in Kiribati listed by UNESCO as a World Heritage Site. PIPA is managed by Kiribati, in partnership with the New England Aquarium and Conservation International (CI).

=== Ramsar sites ===
As a contracting party to the Convention on Wetlands of International Importance (known as the Ramsar Convention), Kiribati is encouraged "to nominate sites containing representative, rare or unique wetlands, or that are important for conserving biological diversity, to the List of Wetlands of International Importance". Kiribati has nominated one site:

Name	Area (ha)	Area (acre)
Nooto - North Tarawa	1,033	2,550

== Areas of high biodiversity and conservation value ==
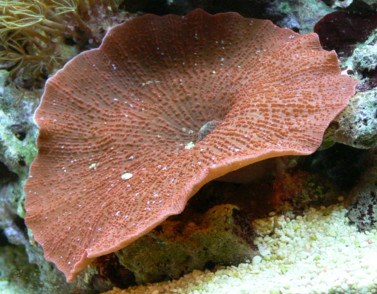
Corallimorpharia

A total of 22 Key Biodiversity Areas (KBAs) - areas of high biodiversity and conservation value - have been identified in Kiribati, with the KBAs encompassing both marine and terrestrial systems (such as bird nesting or feeding environments). The 22 identified KBAs cover an approximate total area of 4 thousand km^{2} (1.5 thousand sq mi) or approximately 74% of the total land, lagoon and reef habitat of Kiribati. As of 2013, 12 of the 22 KBAs have been completely or partially established as conservation areas by the government of Kiribati or by local village communities.

== Phoenix Islands Protected Area ==
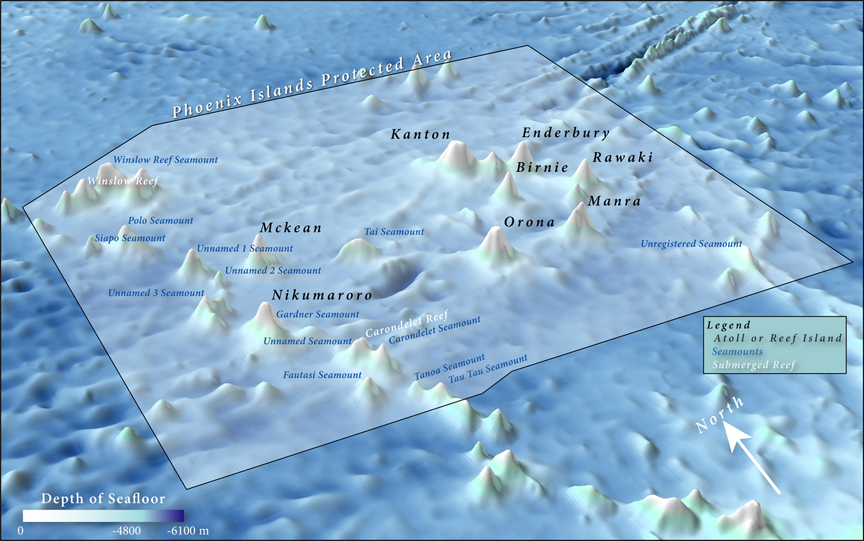
The Phoenix Islands Protected Area is a mostly uninhabited coral archipelago located within a globally biologically important area called the Polynesian/Micronesian hotspot

The 2006 declaration of the Phoenix Islands Protected Area (PIPA), with a size of 397,447 km^{2} (153,455 sq mi), created, at that time, the world's largest designated marine protected area (MPA), which was also designated as the world's largest and deepest UNESCO World Heritage Site in 2010.

The PIPA constitutes 11.34% of Kiribati's Exclusive Economic Zone (EEZ). The PIPA conserves one of the world's largest intact oceanic coral archipelago ecosystems, including 14 known underwater seamounts (presumed to be extinct volcanoes) and other deep-sea habitats. The area contains approximately 800 known species of fauna, including about 200 coral species, 500 fish species, 18 marine mammals and 44 bird species. In total it is equivalent to the size of the state of California in the U.S., though the total land area is only 25 km^{2} (9.7 sq mi).

The 14 submerged volcanic seamounts, rise from the sea floor with an average depth of more than 4,500 metres (14,800 ft) and a maximum depth of over 6,000 metres (20,000 ft). The large bathymetric range of the submerged seamounts provides depth defined habitat types fully representative of Pacific mid oceanic biota.

The eight atolls and reef islands within PIPA are also volcanic mountains. All of the Phoenix Islands are uninhabited, except for a few families who live on Canton Island.

== See also ==
- Coral reefs of Kiribati
- Phoenix Islands Protected Area
