= Epiphaxum =

Scientific classification
- Kingdom: Animalia
- Phylum: Cnidaria
- Subphylum: Anthozoa
- Class: Octocorallia
- Order: Scleralcyonacea
- Family: Aulopsammiidae
- Genus: Epiphaxum; Lonsdale, 1850

Synonyms
- Lithotelesto Bayer & Muzik, 1977

Genus of corals

Epiphaxum is a genus of anthozoans in the family Aulopsammiidae.

== Species ==
- Epiphaxum breve Bayer, 1992
- Epiphaxum micropora (Bayer & Muzik, 1977)
- Epiphaxum septifer Bayer, 1992
