= Aulopsammiidae =

Scientific classification
- Domain: Eukaryota
- Kingdom: Animalia
- Phylum: Cnidaria
- Subphylum: Anthozoa
- Class: Octocorallia
- Order: Scleralcyonacea
- Family: Aulopsammiidae; Reuss, 1854

Synonyms
- Lithotelestidae

Family of corals

Aulopsammiidae (synonym: Lithotelestidae) is a family of coral in the order Scleralcyonacea.

McFadden et al. 2022, and some other authors in the past, include the content of this family in the family Helioporidae.

== Characteristics ==
The family is characterized by a crystalline aragonite skeleton formed by stolons and calices, cylindrical calices with secondary lateral calices, and fully retractable polyps with an exoskeleton formed of calcite capstans and crosses.

== Genera ==
- Epiphaxum Lonsdale, 1850

The genus Nanipora Miyazaki & Reimer, 2015 is sometimes also included in this family.
