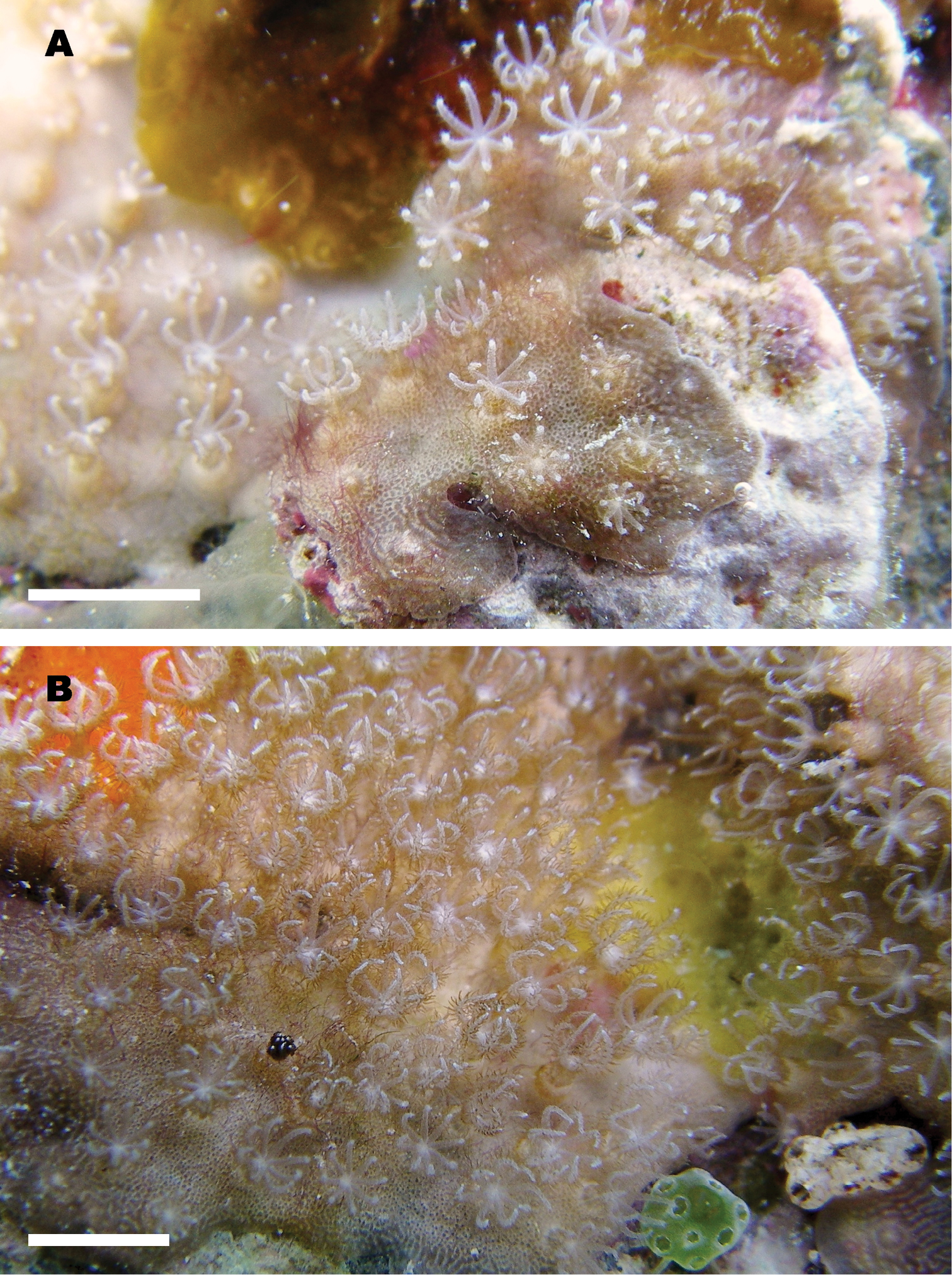

Scientific classification
- Kingdom: Animalia
- Phylum: Cnidaria
- Subphylum: Anthozoa
- Class: Octocorallia
- Order: Scleralcyonacea
- Family: Helioporidae
- Genus: Nanipora; Miyazaki & Reimer, 2015
- Species: N. kamurai

Binomial name
- Nanipora kamurai Miyazaki & Reimer, 2015

= Nanipora =

Genus of corals

Nanipora is a monotypic genus of cnidarian in the family Helioporidae. It consists of a single species, Nanipora kamurai.

== Discovery ==
Nanipora kamurai was first discovered in a public swimming area in Okinawa. The species is considered to be a "living fossil" because the animals most closely related to it genetically are extinct. They are found in coral reefs in Japan and Thailand, and sea beds in the north South China Sea.

Nanipora kamurai may potentially possess the unique ability to survive in extreme environmental conditions caused by ocean acidification.
