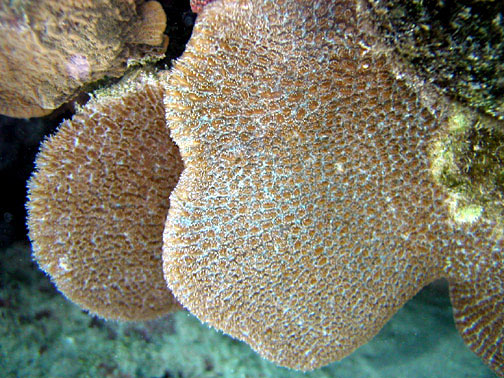

Conservation status
- Least Concern (IUCN 3.1)

Scientific classification
- Kingdom: Animalia
- Phylum: Cnidaria
- Subphylum: Anthozoa
- Class: Hexacorallia
- Order: Scleractinia
- Family: Merulinidae
- Genus: Hydnophora
- Species: H. exesa

Binomial name
- Hydnophora exesa (Pallas, 1766)

= Hydnophora exesa =

Species of coral

Hydnophora exesa, also called Horn coral or Spine coral, is a coral in the genus Hydnophora. It was described by Peter Simon Pallas in 1766.

== Location ==
They are found in the oceans of North and East Australia, Southeast Asia, and East Africa.
