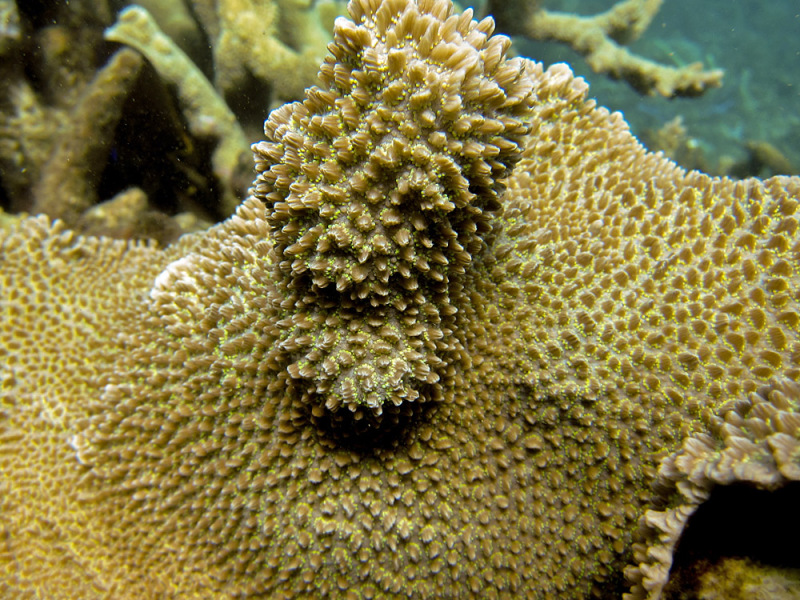
- Hydnophora exesa

Scientific classification
- Domain: Eukaryota
- Kingdom: Animalia
- Phylum: Cnidaria
- Subphylum: Anthozoa
- Class: Hexacorallia
- Order: Scleractinia
- Family: Merulinidae
- Genus: Hydnophora; Fischer von Waldheim, 1807

Species
- See text

Synonyms
- List: Hydnophorella Delage & Hérouard, 1901; Monticularia Lamarck, 1816; Monticulina Saville-Kent, 1893

= Hydnophora =

Genus of corals

Hydnophora is a genus of large polyp stony corals in the family Merulinidae.

== List of species ==
According to World Register of Marine Species :

- Hydnophora bonsai Veron, 1990
- Hydnophora exesa (Pallas, 1766)
- Hydnophora grandis Gardiner, 1904
- Hydnophora microconos (Lamarck, 1816)
- Hydnophora pilosa Veron, 1985
- Hydnophora rigida (Dana, 1846)
