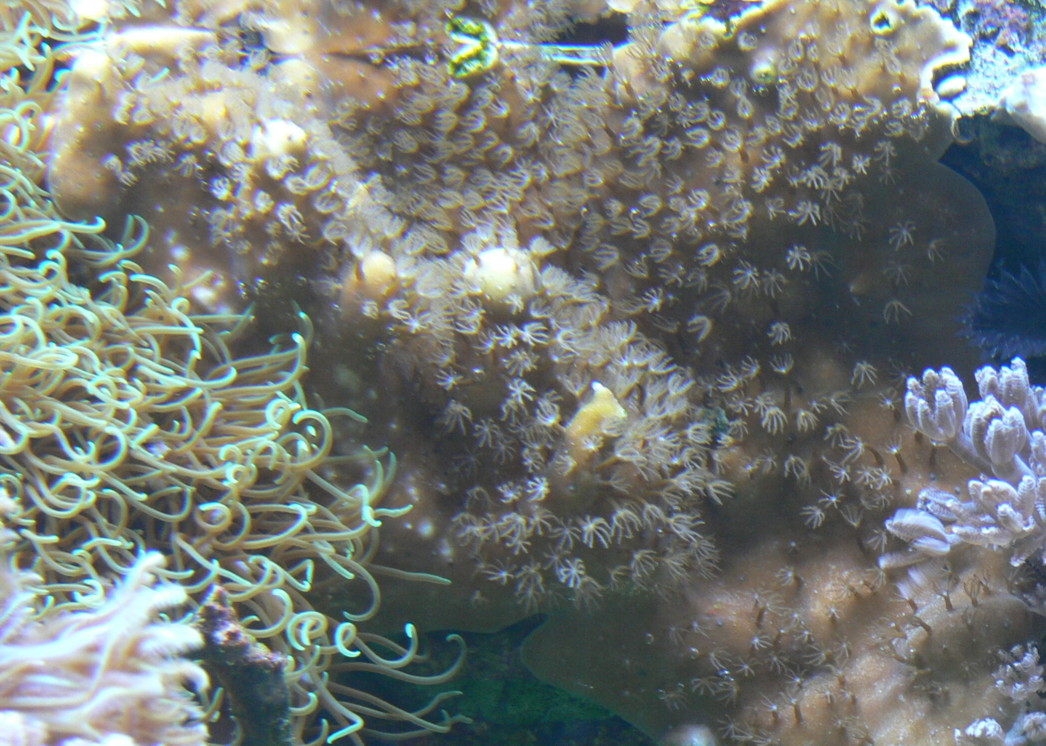
- Heliopora coerulea

Scientific classification
- Kingdom: Animalia
- Phylum: Cnidaria
- Subphylum: Anthozoa
- Class: Octocorallia
- Order: Scleralcyonacea
- Family: Helioporidae; Moseley, 1876
- Genus: Heliopora de Blainville, 1830

= Heliopora =

Genus of corals

Heliopora is a genus of cnidarians in the family Helioporidae (see below for the family). The genus consists of reef building corals, and is ancient and highly conserved. The species Heliopora coerulea is also known as "blue coral".

== Helioporidae ==
In most texts, the family Helioporidae includes only the genus Heliopora and several extinct genera. However, according to McFadden et al. 2022 and some authors in the past, the family Helioporidae is identical with the whole traditional order Helioporacea, i. e. it also contains what is called the family Aulopsammiidae (= Lithotelestidae) by other authors.

== Species ==
Currently, the species known to be part of the genus Heliopora are:

- Heliopora coerulea (Pallas, 1766) - blue coral
- Heliopora fijiensis† Hoffmeister, 1945
- Heliopora hiberniana Richards, Yasuda, Kikuchi, Foster, Mitsuyuki, Stat, Suyama & Wilson, 2018
