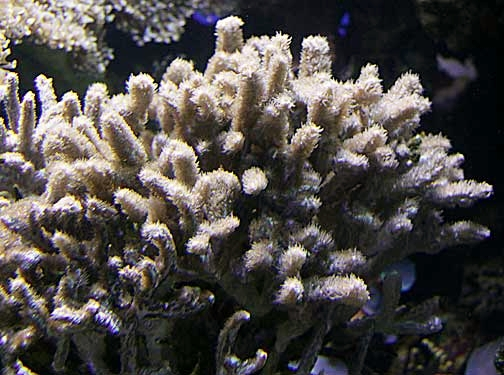

Conservation status
- Least Concern (IUCN 3.1)

Scientific classification
- Kingdom: Animalia
- Phylum: Cnidaria
- Subphylum: Anthozoa
- Class: Hexacorallia
- Order: Scleractinia
- Family: Merulinidae
- Genus: Hydnophora
- Species: H. rigida

Binomial name
- Hydnophora rigida (Dana, 1846)

= Hydnophora rigida =

Species of coral in the family Merulinidae

Hydnophora rigida, commonly known as horn coral, are found in reefs and are in the genus Hydnophora. They were first described by James Dwight Dana in 1846. Their color is naturally green and brown, or sometimes cream. They can also become fluorescent green and cyano-red emission.

== Distribution and background ==
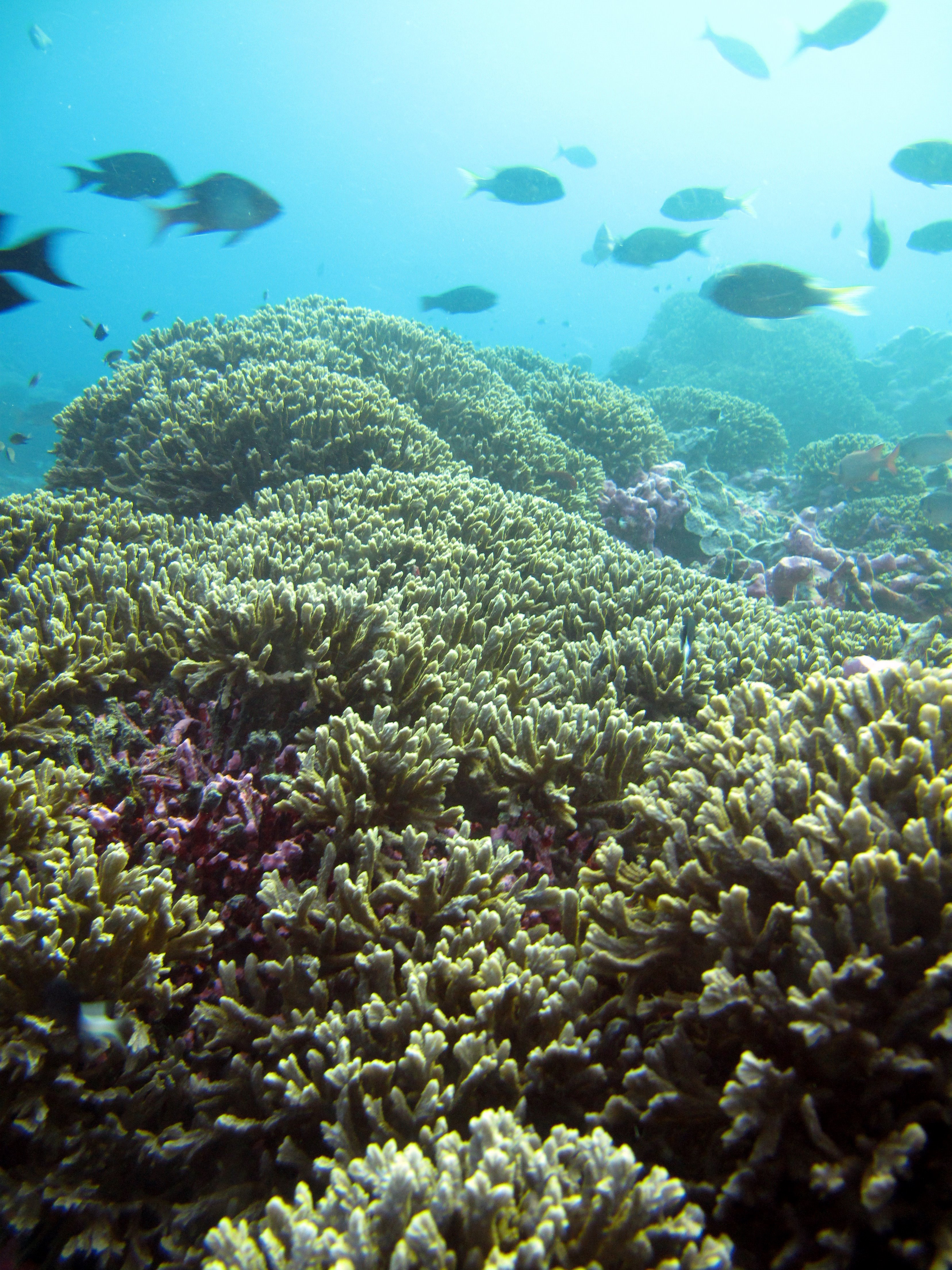
Hydnophora rigida corals on Kanton, part of the Phoenix Islands Protected Area

H. rigida was first described by Dana in 1846. One of the most common species of Hydnophora is the H. rigida. Other common names are horn coral or spine coral. They are commonly found in shallow reef environments around Australia and the Philippines, Fiji, Indonesia, Samoa, Solomon Islands, in the Great Barrier Reef, North West Cape and the Coral Sea. They can also be found on the east coasts of Africa and around Madagascar. H. rigida tends to inhabit lagoons and protected reef slopes.

== Description ==
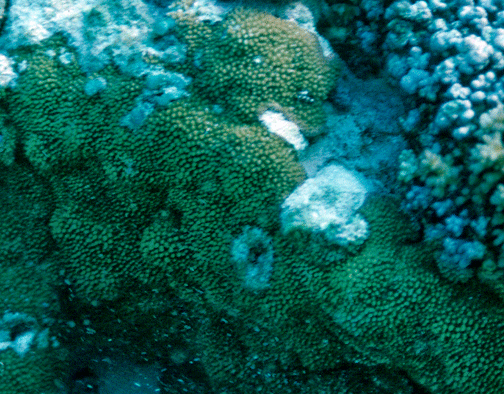

H. rigida has thin branches that are cream or green without the encrusting bases. The horn coral also has a green fluorescence or a cyano red emission. They can be seen at depths from 1–30 m (3–100 ft). The colonies are bushy with small conical mounts called monticules that are unique because they form where the corallite walls of the adjacent polyp fuse together. The polyps that surround the base of monticules can seem brown and may contrast slightly. They also have tentacles that can come out at night.

== Reproduction ==
The colonies of H. rigida spawn after the full moon of November. They are simultaneously hermaphrodite coral that develop eggs earlier than the testis and there are some strong indications that many colonies of H. rigida carry out multiple gametogenic cycles each year. In the Houtman Abrolhos Islands, the coral colonies would contain ripe eggs in March, so people inferred that they are part of the mass spawning event that happens in western Australia. It has been found that the population of H. rigida was always in a fertile condition from November to February and this indicates that the spawning season may spread over several months each year.

This coral releases the eggs instead of the planulae larva, which indicates that they are broadcaster spawners. The size of their eggs is relatively small, about 220 μm. This is another indication that they may spawn several times a year unlike other coral species that only spawn once a year. Researchers have also found that most colonies contained ripe eggs before the full moon and ripe testes around the full moon of November since they found out there are significantly less fertile colonies found in December. Since they spawn in November, scientists have speculated that they have a biannual cycle when they also spawn in March and it is not overlapping.

Once the planula larvae are formed from the fertilized egg, the larvae settle onto the substrates and then become planters. Then they begin to form tiny polyps that excrete calcium carbonate and slowly develop into a coral.
