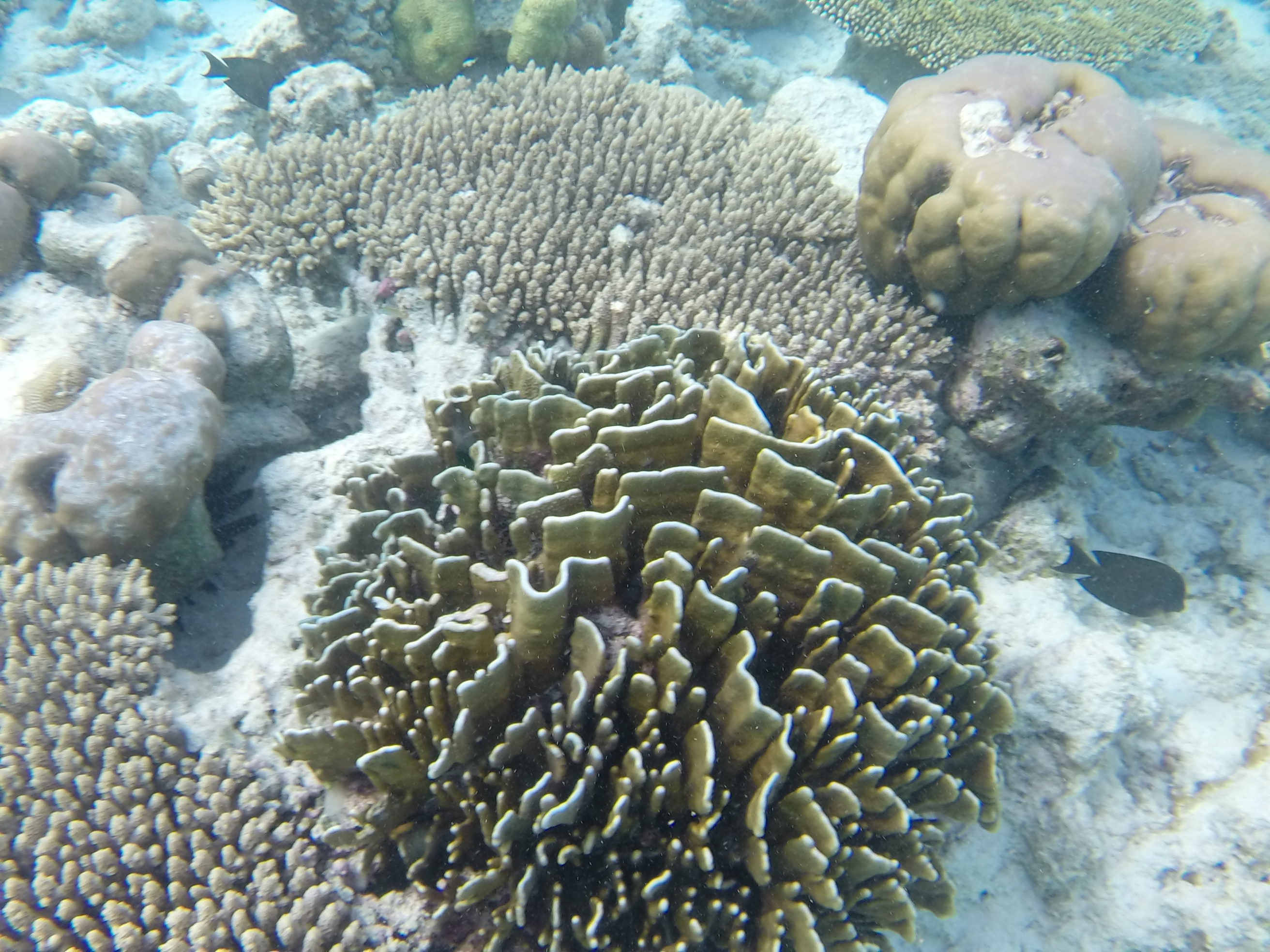

Conservation status
- Least Concern (IUCN 3.1)
- CITES Appendix II

Scientific classification
- Kingdom: Animalia
- Phylum: Cnidaria
- Subphylum: Anthozoa
- Class: Octocorallia
- Order: Scleralcyonacea
- Family: Helioporidae
- Genus: Heliopora
- Species: H. coerulea

Binomial name
- Heliopora coerulea Pallas, 1766

= Blue coral =

Species of colonial coral

Blue coral (Heliopora coerulea) is a species of colonial coral. It is the only octocoral known to produce a massive skeleton. This skeleton is formed of aragonite, similar to that of scleractinia. Individual polyps live in tubes within the skeleton and are connected by a thin layer of tissue over the outside of the skeleton.

== Description ==
The blue coral is the only extant octocoral with a massive skeleton, which is composed of fibrocrystalline aragonite (calcium carbonate). It is a hermatypic zooxanthellaete species with either blue or green-grey polyps located within its skeleton, with each containing eight tentacles. Its colonies are either columnar, plate like or branched. It is a tolerant species and is used in marine aquariums.

Iron salts give the skeleton of Heliopora coerulea its unique color, which allows for easy recognition in fossil outcrops. As such, it is fairly abundant within paleontology, with fossils indicating the species has remained unchanged since the Cretaceous.

Blue coral has shown a particular resistance to thermal changes in its environment and has actually grown more in warmer temperatures.

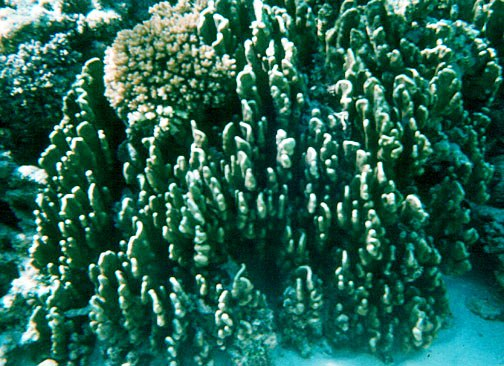
Live colony

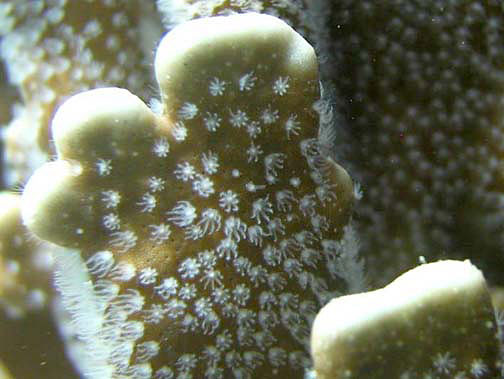
Close-up on live polyps (notice the 8 arms)

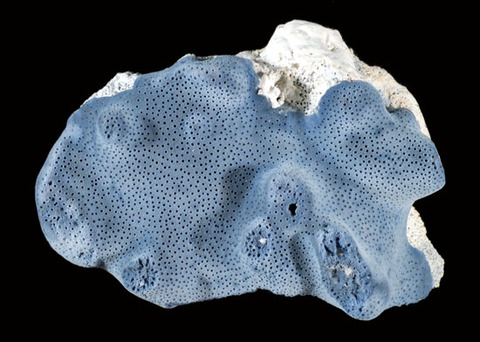
Preserved skeleton, showing the typical color

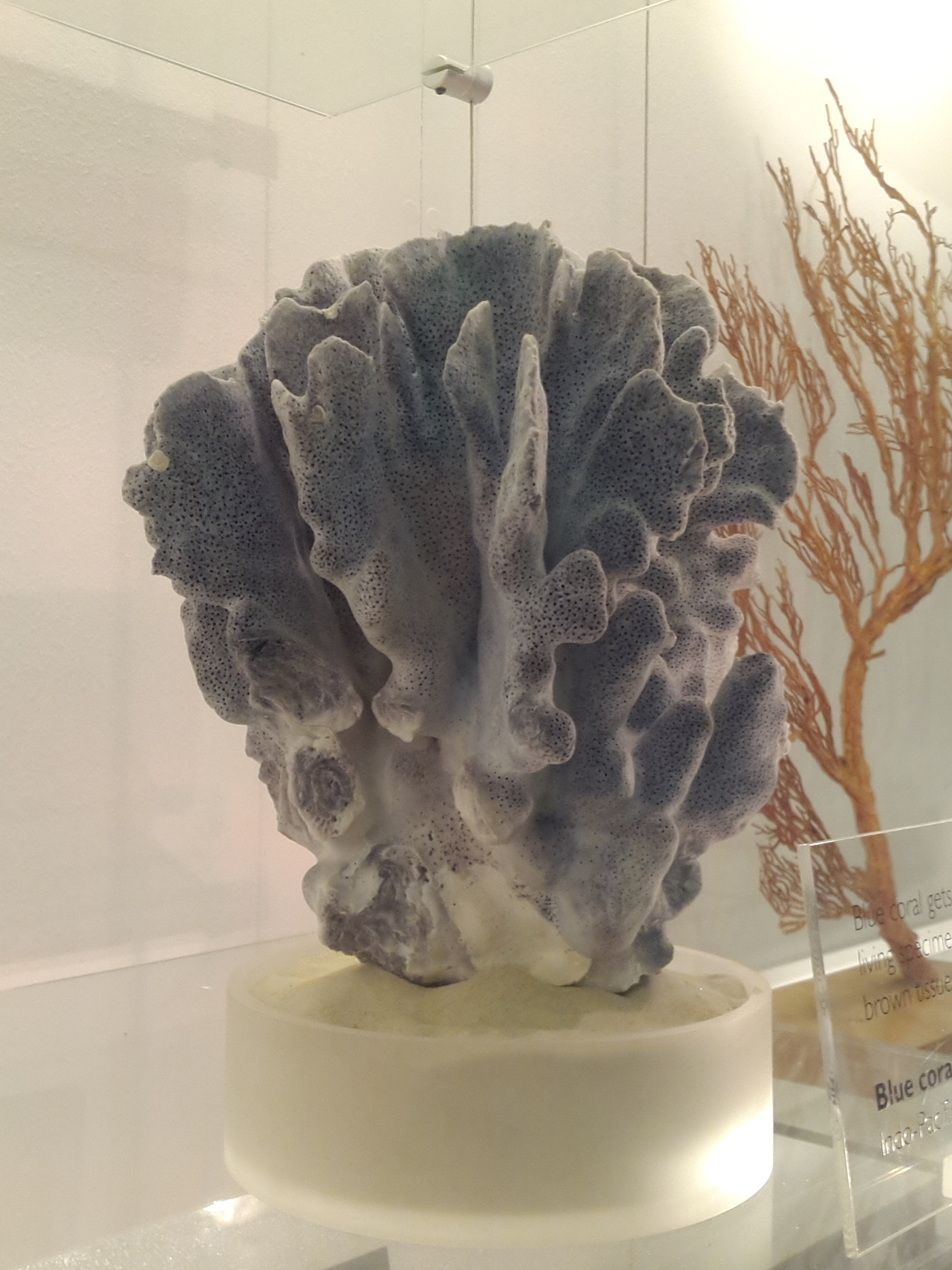
idem

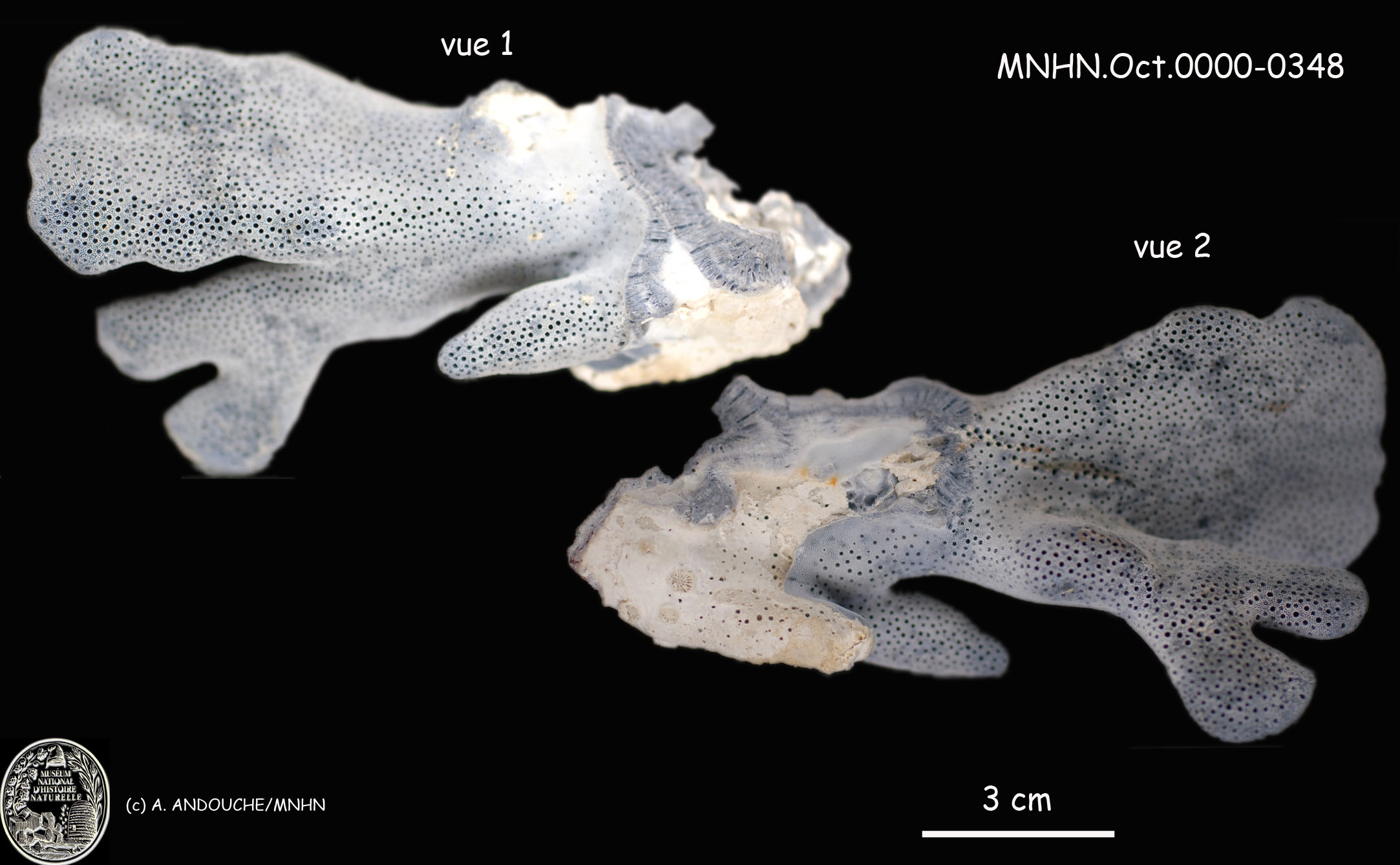
Close-up

== Distribution ==
Despite being common in some areas and having a large range, the blue coral has been given the conservation status of a vulnerable species by the IUCN. Its population is unknown but it is believed to be decreasing in line with the global destruction of coral reefs; it is threatened by aquarium harvesting, bleaching, habitat destruction, the acidification of oceans, and climate change. It is found in the eastern and western Indian Ocean, and the eastern central, western central, northwestern, and southwestern Pacific Ocean; its range includes the Great Barrier Reef, Australia, Japan and the Ryukyu Islands. Its largest colony is believed to be located off Ishigaki Island in the Yaeyama Islands, southwestern Japan. It is found in reefs with depths below 2 m (6.6 ft), or reefs exposed to waves, flats, intertidal regions, and sometimes in marginal habitats. The blue coral is listed under Appendix II of CITES.

The world's largest deposit of blue coral is in Shiraho, Japan. This deposit however was threatened by the possible development of an airport in 1989. The airport was to be placed over the coral bed and would have resulted in the destruction of these rare coral. Transnational organizations such as the World Wide Fund for Nature stepped in and with public support managed to prevent the construction. The organization also constructed a field research station at the site to further study the corals. The airport was eventually built but at a location where it wouldn't harm the corals. The Fund then attempted to implement their typical procedures of creating protected areas for the coral. However, the prior support from the public disappeared. The residents of Shiraho were opposed to the creation of such areas.

Conservationists thus took a different approach. They attempted to further connect the community of Shiraho with the sea, beyond just fishing, to try to inspire a desire to conserve the area. What resulted was the revitalization of sanizu. It is a local celebration where the people give back to the sea gods. The tradition had decreased in prevalence over the years due to a variety of reasons including economic pressure and other local socioeconomic conditions. The Fund was unable to initiate the celebration so instead they provided the tools and resources for it. This led to a large-scale sanizu celebration where both locals and conservationists connected with the sea.

== Taxonomy ==
Heliopora coerulea was described by Pallas in 1766.
