= Kukutin =

Coordinates: 04°31′S 172°13′W

Kukutin is a settlement in Kiribati. It is located on the Orona atoll; the nearest locations, to the west, are Noriti and Ritiati, both about 138 nautical miles (256 km) away.

this is an abandoned settlement and the atoll the settlement was once on is now part of the Phoenix Islands laying halfway between Hawaii and Australia

== See also ==
- Arariki
