= Ritiati =

Coordinates: 4°40′S 174°32′W

Ritiati was a settlement on a Nikumaroro atoll in Kiribati. The closest settlements, Arariki and Kukutin, are about 138 nautical miles (256 km) away.

== See also ==
- Noriti
