= Gerald Gallagher =

British colonial administrator

- Born: Gerald Bernard Gallagher; 6 July 1912
- Died: 29 September 1941 (aged 29); Gardner Island
- Resting place: Tarawa
- Other name: Karaka
- Education: Downing College, Cambridge
- Years active: 1936–1941
- Employer: Colonial Service
- Notable work: Phoenix Islands Settlement Scheme

Gerald Bernard Gallagher (6 July 1912 – 27 September 1941) was a British government employee, noted as the first officer-in-charge of the Phoenix Islands Settlement Scheme, the last colonial expansion of the British Empire. Gallagher spent much of his career on Nikumaroro, an island notable for its connection to Amelia Earhart.

== Background and early life ==
Gallagher was the son of Gerald and Edith Gallagher, and has a younger brother, Terence Hugh Gallagher. His father, Gerald Hugh Gallagher, was born in Ireland and attended the Catholic University in Dublin, becoming a doctor in 1905.

Gerald Gallagher attended Stonyhurst College, Downing College, Cambridge, and St Bartholomew's Hospital Medical School. While at university, he was also active in gymnastics and rowing. After studying practical agriculture with George Butler (the father of the writer Hubert Butler) at Maiden Hall in Bennetsbridge, County Kilkenny, Ireland, he joined the Colonial Service in 1936.

== The Phoenix Islands ==
After arriving at Banaba Island on 21 September 1937, Gallagher received additional training before being appointed deputy commissioner of the Gilbert and Ellice Islands Colony on 3 June 1938. Sent to the Ellice Islands to learn Tuvaluan he became popular with the residents, who wanted him to stay. Nevertheless, after a bout with tropical ulcers he was assigned to the Phoenix Islands Settlement Scheme, as second-in-command to Harry Maude. In December 1938, they sailed with the first Gilbertese colonists to Manra in the Phoenix Islands, where Gallagher remained to supervise development of that island. When Maude fell ill in late 1939 and was assigned to Pitcairn Island, Gallagher was appointed officer in charge of the three atolls selected for development. He was assisted by Jack Kimo Petro, later characterized by archaeologist and historian Tom King as "a half-Tuvaluan/half Portuguese engineer and artisan of considerable skill and energy."

Gallagher's supervising role in the colony's local government was shared with leaders chosen from among the colonists. The young British official skillfully settled an early, hotly disputed debate among them by suggesting that instead of using the traditional Gilbertese boti system, each household be given a place in the maneaba, or local meeting house. The Phoenix Islands maneaba was subsequently named tabuki ni Karaka, or Gallagher's accomplishment.

== Success at Manra and Orona ==
By late 1940 there were roughly 672 settlers on Manra and Orona, with coconuts being harvested and processed into copra. On Nikumaroro an area on the southwest side of the island had been cleared and planted, a 20,000 gallon water cistern had been installed and water wells were finally productive. Gallagher, who by now had been affectionately nicknamed "Irish" by some of the settlers, chose Nikumaroro as the colony's government centre and moved there in late September 1940.

== Nikumaroro ==
Gallagher wished to establish Gardner Island (later renamed Nikumaroro) as "the model island of the Phoenix." Although the gathering war interfered with shipping, Gallagher and the settlers were persistent, starting work on the government station and an official rest house by manually clearing away many rocks and tree roots. The end of 1940 saw severe north-westerly gales which damaged newly built houses, coconut plantings and other facilities.

The government station was later called Karaka, after Gallagher. It featured a large, expertly levelled parade ground with a crushed white coral surface and flanked on three sides by wide roads with coral slab curbs. At the eastern side two buildings were constructed on concrete platforms with others along the north and west, including a school, village carpenter's shop, boat house, concrete dispensary and a wireless station nearby to the north (with line of sight to Ocean Island). The village was to the south, with typical homes made up of sleeping quarters and a cookhouse under thatched roofs, sometimes raised on coral blocks.

The most memorable building is said to have been the rest house, with its sweeping thatched roof and wide veranda, complete with a modern RCA console radio in a wooden cabinet (powered by large batteries). This was both Gallagher's residence and quarters for visiting officials along with other invited guests.

== Death on Nikumaroro ==
By early 1941 the Battle of Britain had distracted London's attention far from the tiny colony. Shipping was a constant challenge and Gallagher, now certified as fluent in the colonists' Gilbertese language, travelled on the few available ships, working day and night, personally loading and unloading supplies along with distributing coast-watching personnel and equipment throughout the colony, often in secret.

On 20 September 1941, Sir Harry Luke, High Commissioner of the western Pacific, sent Gallagher a coded telegram with word he was about to be promoted as secretary to government and reposted to Ocean Island, but Gallagher didn't reply to the polite query asking for his thoughts on this. That day he had fallen seriously ill at sea with tropical sprue, an infection sometimes aggravated by poor nutrition which interferes with the small intestine's ability to absorb nutrients, resulting in symptoms related to malnutrition.

He arrived at Nikumaroro on the 24th. Gallagher's first night back on the atoll and in the rest house seemed to bring an improvement. However, according to a witness, when Gallagher learned of his promotion the news put him at "the end of his tether." He had come to consider the Gilbertese colonists his own native people. Meanwhile, with Gallagher's permission a British doctor opened his abdomen and was shocked by the advanced state of damage he found. Gallagher's condition deteriorated rapidly and he died on 27 September 1941, at the age of 29.

== Aftermath and legacy ==
Nikumaroro, Manra and Orona were evacuated by Her Majesty's Government in 1963. At his mother's request, Gallagher's remains were moved to Tarawa for reburial and the memorial plaque was retrieved. Although reasons cited for giving up on the struggling colony included unstable water lenses and uncertain copra markets, observers familiar with the colony's history remarked that after Gallagher's death a will or nerve to succeed seemed to vanish from the settlements. In 2001 an American archaeological team put a replica of the plaque on his grave, quite unaware it had been empty for 38 years. They were on the island because during the height of the Battle of Britain in October 1940, Gallagher, a licensed pilot, had radioed his superiors in Fiji to inform them he believed a work party of Gilbertese colonists on Nikumaroro had found a sextant box along with the skeletal remains possibly belonging to Amelia Earhart, an aviator who disappeared in 1937.

In 2007 Gallagher's long-empty 1941 grave was still visible in the overgrown ruins of the colonial government station on Nikumaroro.

== See also ==
- Nikumaroro
- Phoenix Islands
- Gilbert Islands
- Phoenix Islands Settlement Scheme
- Kiribati
- Amelia Earhart
- Fred Noonan
