= Hubert Butler =

Irish essayist (1900–1991)

- Born: 23 October 1900; Maiden Hall, Bennettsbridge, County Kilkenny, Ireland
- Died: 5 January 1991 (aged 90); Maiden Hall, Bennettsbridge, County Kilkenny, Ireland
- Education: St John's College, Oxford
- Occupations: Essayist; historian; archaeologist
- Relatives: Tyrone Guthrie (brother-in-law)

Hubert Marshal Butler (23 October 1900 – 5 January 1991) was an Irish essayist who wrote on a wide range of topics, from local history and archaeology to the political and religious affairs of eastern Europe before and during World War II. He also travelled to Nazi Austria on his own initiative and at his own expense and helped save Jews from being sent to concentration camps.

== Early life ==
Butler was born on 23 October 1900 at the family home of Maiden Hall outside the village of Bennettsbridge in County Kilkenny, son of George Butler (1859–1941), a farmer and High Sheriff of Kilkenny, and Harriet (1867–1939), daughter of Marshall Neville Clarke, of Graiguenoe Park, Holycross, County Tipperary. Butler graduated in 1922 from St John's College, Oxford, where, "after a disappointing college career", he graduated with a pass degree in classics. After being recruited by Sir Horace Plunkett to work for the Irish County Libraries from graduation until 1926, Butler later travelled extensively in Croatia, Serbia, Bosnia, Macedonia and Montenegro before working with the Quakers in Vienna expediting the escape of Jews after the Anschluss.

Butler's father, George Butler, was teaching practical agriculture to Gerald Gallagher on the farm at Maiden Hall when Gallagher applied for a position in the British colonial service, where he became the first officer-in-charge of the Phoenix Islands Settlement Scheme, the last colonial expansion of the British Empire.

Upon the death of George Butler in 1941, Hubert Butler inherited Maiden Hall and returned to live with his family in the house on the banks of the River Nore until his death in 1991. In 1930, he married Susan Margaret (usually referred to as Peggy), daughter of Thomas Clement Guthrie, of Tunbridge Wells, Kent, and sister of the theatre director Tyrone Guthrie, the moving force behind foundation of the Kilkenny Art Gallery Society. They had one daughter. Tyrone Guthrie was instrumental in establishing internationally renowned Stratford Theatre in Stratford, Ontario, Canada.

== Historian and writer ==
Butler sought to encourage understanding of Irish social and political history through study of the land, the people and the primary source materials. He was a co-reviver of the Kilkenny Archaeological Society and through it promoted Catholic-Protestant reconciliation. Always stylish and subtle, his writing used local events as parables for the politics and pressures that accompanied the emergence of the Irish state. His book Ten Thousand Saints was a virtuoso performance, concluding with a theory that the apparently absurd legends of Irish prehistory and theology could provide evidence of the migration of Iron-age tribes around Europe. He illustrated the point by reference to local history and scholarship. Having argued that the saints of Ireland were disguised personifications of the tribes and political factions of Iron-age Ireland, he went on to suggest that the Old Testament could be the same for Jewish prehistory.

== Saving Jews from the Holocaust ==
In 1938 Butler was disgusted at the antisemitic comments in Ireland particularly those of Oliver J. Flanagan who in a statement to the Dáil said "They (the Jews) crucified our Saviour 1,900 years ago and they have been crucifying us every day of the week". In response to comments like this Butler wrote that "I was as Irish as Oliver Flanagan and I was determined that Jewish refugees should come to Ireland" He then traveled to Austria and the first people he saved were Erwin Strunz, his wife and two children, who he helped travel from Austria to Ireland. He continued saving lives and working with both the Irish Quakers and American Quakers secured exit visas for dozen of Jews to escape from Vienna to Ireland and helped them to settle in the Americas.

== Post WW2 ==
After giving a broadcast talk in 1947 about Yugoslavia he was publicly criticised for failing to mention the alleged suffering of Catholics under Josip Broz Tito's regime. He responded by trying to draw attention to another matter he had avoided in his radio talk, and which he saw as a greater scandal: the involvement of Catholic clergy with the Ustaša, a Nazi-installed puppet regime that had waged a genocidal crusade against non-Catholics in part of Yugoslavia during World War II. Butler's efforts in this respect earned him notoriety and public opprobrium in clerical Ireland to the extent that he felt obliged to leave the archaeological society he had played a big part in reviving.

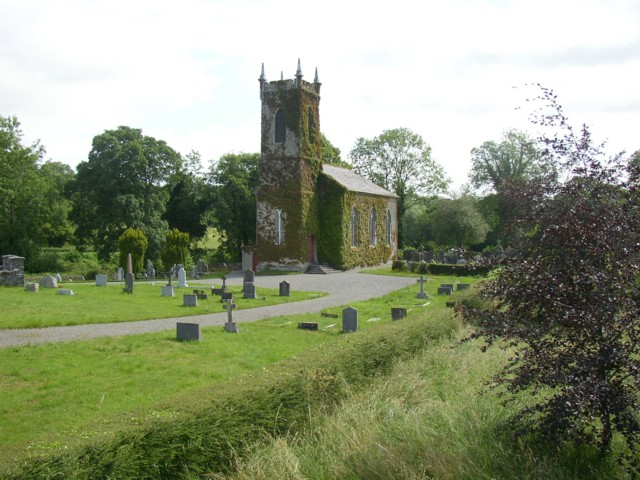
St. Peter's Church in Ennisnag

Butler was a keen market gardener as well as a writer and his circle of friends included the Mary Poppins creator Pamela Travers, the journalist Claud Cockburn, and the poet Padraic Colum. He believed strongly in the importance of the family and, as well as playing an active role in keeping his own extended family in touch, he was the founder of the Butler Society. He is buried five miles from the family home at St. Peter's Church, Ennisnag, Kilkenny. The Kilkenny Art Gallery Society's Butler Gallery was named in honour of Hubert and Peggy.

== Books ==
- Ten Thousand Saints: A Study in Irish and European Origins, Wellbrook Press (1972)
- Ten Thousand Saints: A Study in Irish and European Origins, a new edition, amplified and updated, Lilliput Press (2011)
- The Sub-Prefect Should Have Held His Tongue, and Other Essays, ed. R.F. Foster, Allen Lane The Penguin Press (London 1990)

== Translations ==
- Anton Chekhov, The Cherry Orchard. Intro. Tyrone Guthrie. London: H.F.W. Dane & Sons Ltd; Boston.: Baker's Plays (1934)
- Leonid Leonov, The Thief. London: Martin Warburg (1931) New York: Vintage (1960)

== Collected essays ==
Published by the Lilliput Press of Dublin

- Escape from the Anthill (1985)
- Escape from the Anthill, revised with corrections (1986)
- The Children of Drancy (1988)
- Grandmother and Wolf Tone (1990)
- In the Land of Nod (1996).
- The Appleman and the Poet (2014).

Published in London by Penguin Books

- The Sub-Prefect Should Have Held His Tongue, and Other Essays (1992)

Published in US by Farrar, Straus and Giroux

- Independent Spirit (1997)

Published in France by Editions Anatolia

- L'Envahisseur est venu en Pantoufles (1995) with introduction by Joseph Brodsky

== Published works about Hubert Butler ==
- Doctoral thesis by Robert B. Tobin, Oxford D.Phil., 2004: The minority voice: Hubert Butler, southern Protestantism and intellectual dissent, 1930-72.
- Chris Agee, ed. (2003). Unfinished Ireland: Essays on Hubert Butler. Irish Pages, in association with the Butler Society. ISBN 978-0-9544257-0-8.
