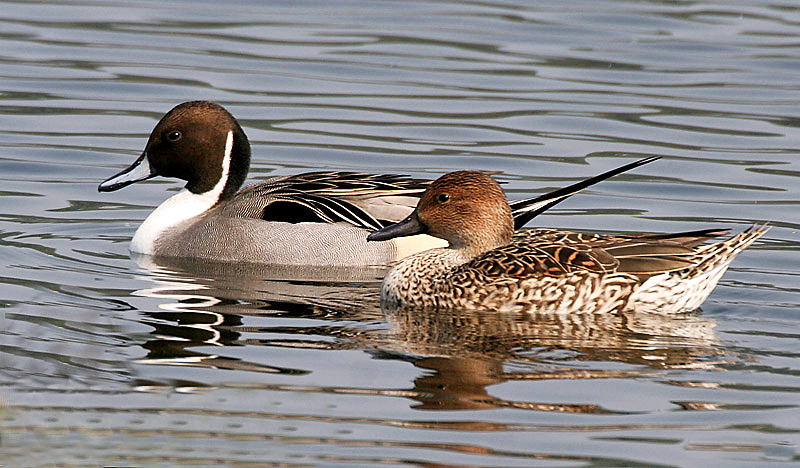
- Male and female (left–right); Call

Conservation status
- Least Concern (IUCN 3.1)

Scientific classification
- Kingdom: Animalia
- Phylum: Chordata
- Class: Aves
- Order: Anseriformes
- Family: Anatidae
- Genus: Anas
- Species: A. acuta

Binomial name
- Anas acuta Linnaeus, 1758
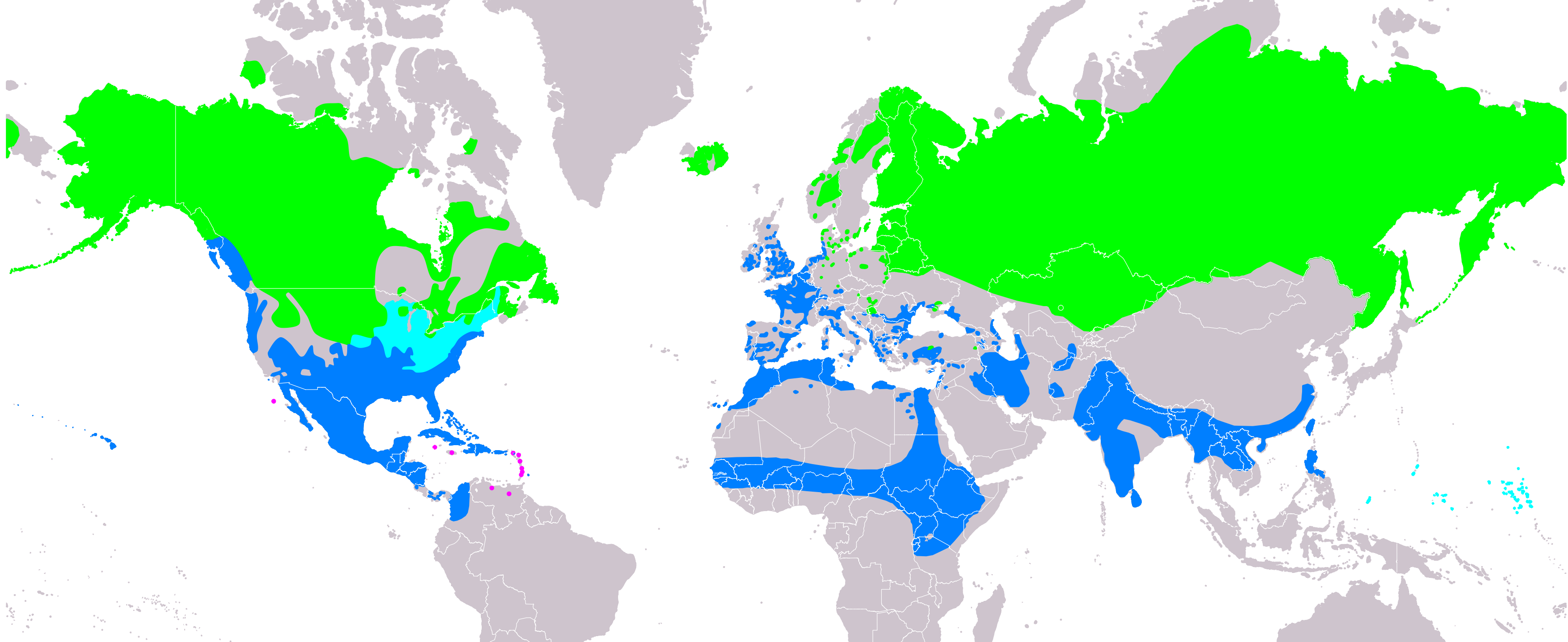
- Range of A. acuta Breeding Passage Non-breeding Vagrant (seasonality uncertain)

Synonyms
- Dafila acuta

= Northern pintail =

Migratory duck that breeds in northern Eurasia and North America

Anas acuta

The pintail or northern pintail (Anas acuta) is a duck species with wide geographic distribution that breeds in the northern areas of Europe and across the Palearctic and North America. It is migratory and winters south of its breeding range as far as the equator. Unusually for a bird with such a large range, it has no geographical subspecies, although the possibly conspecific duck Eaton's pintail is considered to be a separate species.

The Northern Pintail is a large duck, and the long central tail feathers of the male give the species its English and scientific names. Both sexes have blue-grey bills and grey legs and feet. The drake is more striking, with a thin white stripe running from the back of its chocolate-coloured head down its neck to its mostly white underparts. The drake also has attractive grey, brown, and black markings on its back and sides. The hen's plumage is more subtle and subdued, with drab brown feathers similar to those of other female dabbling ducks. Hens make a rough quacking sound and the drakes a flute-like whistle.

The Northern Pintail is a bird of open wetlands that nests on the ground, often some distance from water. It feeds by dabbling for plant food, adding small invertebrates to its diet during the nesting season. It is highly gregarious when not breeding, forming large mixed flocks with other duck species. This duck's population is affected by predators, parasites and avian diseases. Human activities, such as agriculture, hunting and fishing, have also had a significant impact on numbers. Despite this, the species is not globally threatened due to its large range and abundance.

== Taxonomy ==
This species was first described by Carl Linnaeus in his landmark 1758 10th edition of Systema Naturae as Anas acuta. The scientific name comes from two Latin words: anas, meaning "duck", and acuta, which comes from the verb acuere, "to sharpen"; the species term like the English name, refers to the pointed tail of the male in breeding plumage. Within the large dabbling duck genus Anas, the northern pintail's closest relatives are other pintails, such as the yellow-billed pintail (A. georgica) and Eaton's pintail (A. eatoni). The pintails are sometimes grouped in the genus Dafila (described by Stephens, 1824), an arrangement supported by morphological, molecular and behavioural data. The famous British ornithologist Sir Peter Scott gave this name to his daughter, the artist Dafila Scott.

Eaton's pintail has two subspecies, A. e. eatoni (the Kerguelen pintail) of Kerguelen Islands, and A. e. drygalskyi (the Crozet pintail) of Crozet Islands, and was formerly considered conspecific with the Northern Hemisphere's northern pintail. Sexual dimorphism is much less pronounced in the southern pintail, with the breeding plumage of the male resembling that of the female. Unusually for a species with such a large range, the northern pintail has no geographical subspecies if Eaton's pintail is treated as a separate species.

An assumed extinct subspecies from Manra Island, Tristram's pintail, A. a. modesta, appears to be indistinguishable from the nominate form. The three syntype specimens of Dafila modesta Tristram (Proceedings of the Zoological Society of London, 1886, p.79. pl. VII), the extinct subspecies, are held in the vertebrate zoology collections of National Museums Liverpool at World Museum, with accession numbers NML-VZ T11792 (male immature), NML-VZ T11795 (female adult) and NML-VZ T11797 (female adult). The specimens were collected by J. V. Arundel in Sydney Island (Manra Island), Phoenix Islands in 1885 and came to the Liverpool national collection via Canon Henry Baker Tristram's collection which was purchased in 1896.

== Description ==
The northern pintail is a fairly large duck with a wing chord of 23.6–28.2 cm (9.3–11.1 in) and wingspan of 80–95 cm (31–37 in). The male is 59–76 cm (23–30 in) in length and weighs 450–1,360 g (0.99–3.00 lb), and therefore is considerably larger than the female, which is 51–64 cm (20–25 in) long and weighs 454–1,135 g (1.001–2.502 lb). The northern pintail broadly overlaps in size with the similarly widespread mallard, but is more slender, elongated and gracile, with a relatively longer neck and (in males) a longer tail. The unmistakable breeding plumaged male has a chocolate-brown head and white breast with a white stripe extending up the side of the neck. Its upperparts and sides are grey, but elongated grey feathers with black central stripes are draped across the back from the shoulder area. The vent area is yellow, contrasting with the black underside of the tail, which has the central feathers elongated to as much as 10 cm (3.9 in). The bill is bluish and the legs are blue-grey.

The adult female is mainly scalloped and mottled in light brown with a more uniform grey-brown head, and its pointed tail is shorter than that of the male; it is still easily identified by its shape, long neck, and long grey bill. In non-breeding (eclipse) plumage, the drake pintail looks similar to the female, but retains the male upper wing pattern and long grey shoulder feathers. Juveniles resemble the female, but are less neatly scalloped and have a duller brown speculum with a narrower trailing edge.

The pintail walks well on land, and swims well. In water, the swimming position is forward leaning, with the base of the neck almost flush with the water. It has a very fast flight, with the wings slightly swept back, rather than straight out from the body like other ducks. In flight, the male has a black speculum with a white border at the rear and pale rufous at the front, while the female's speculum is dark brown with a white border, narrow at the front edge but very prominent at the back, being visible at a distance of 1,600 m (1 mi).

The male's call is a soft proop-proop whistle, similar to that of the common teal, whereas the female has a mallard-like descending quack, and a low croak when flushed.

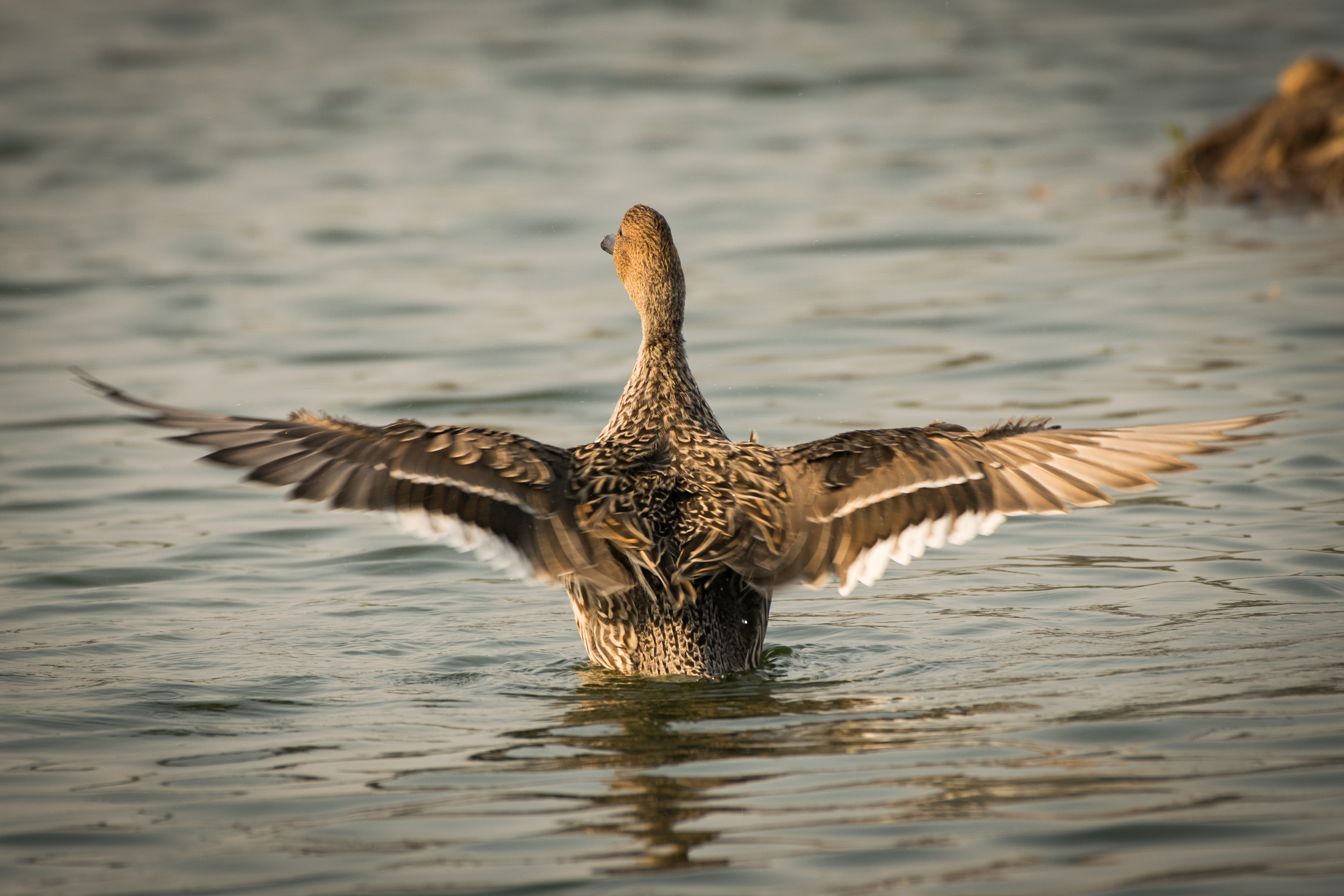
Northern pintail female wingspan

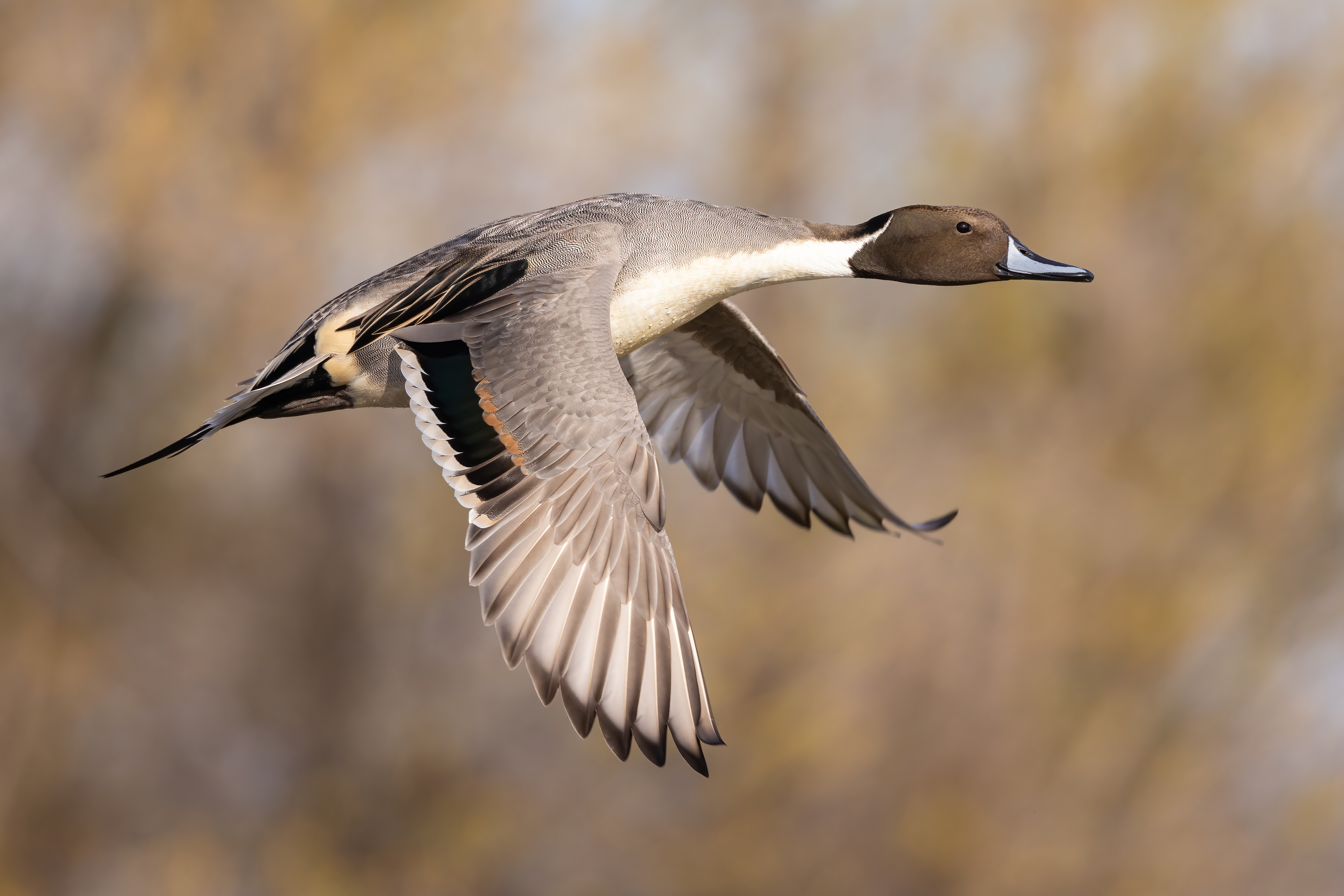
Northern pintail male in flight

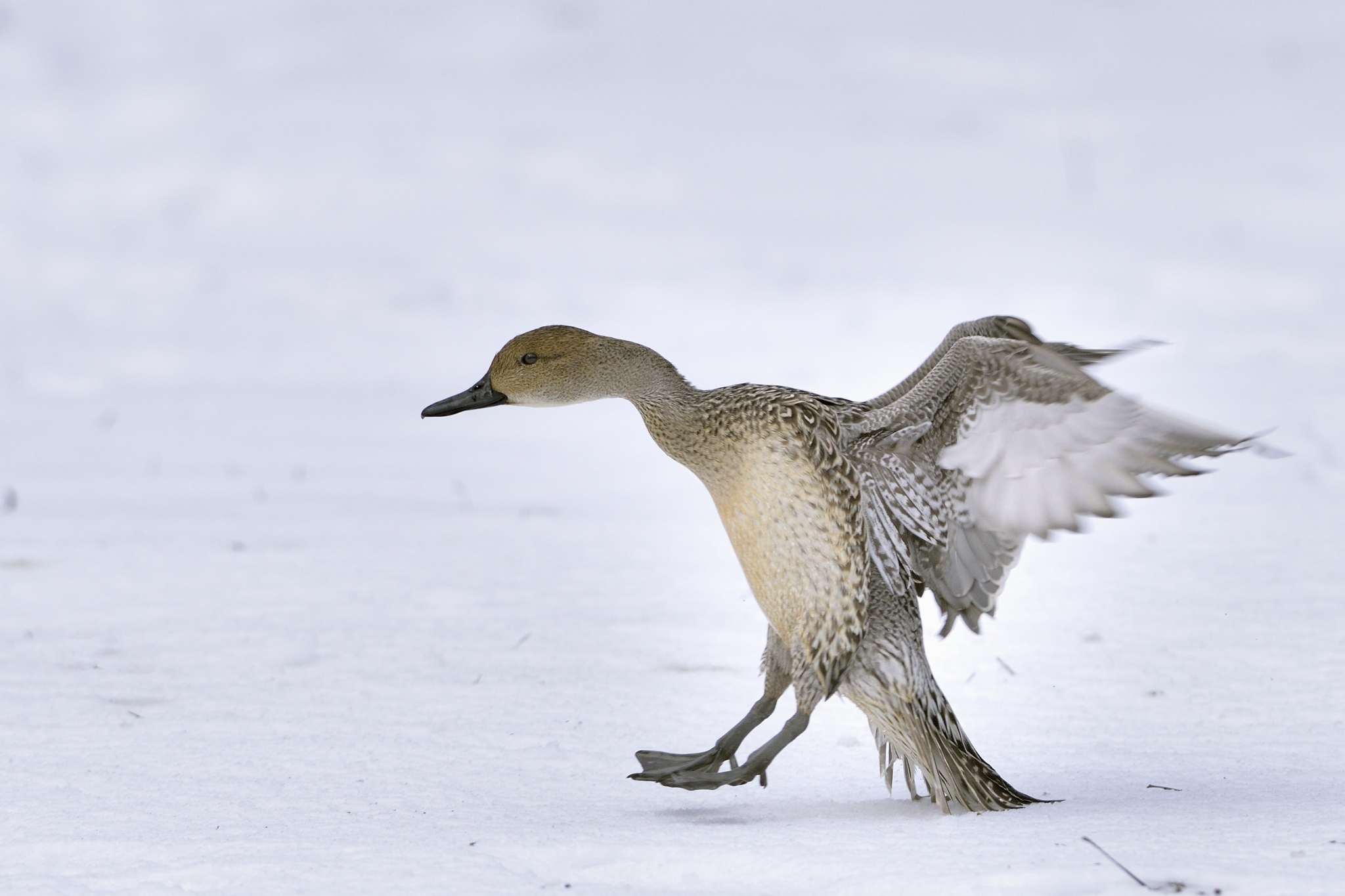
Northern pintail female

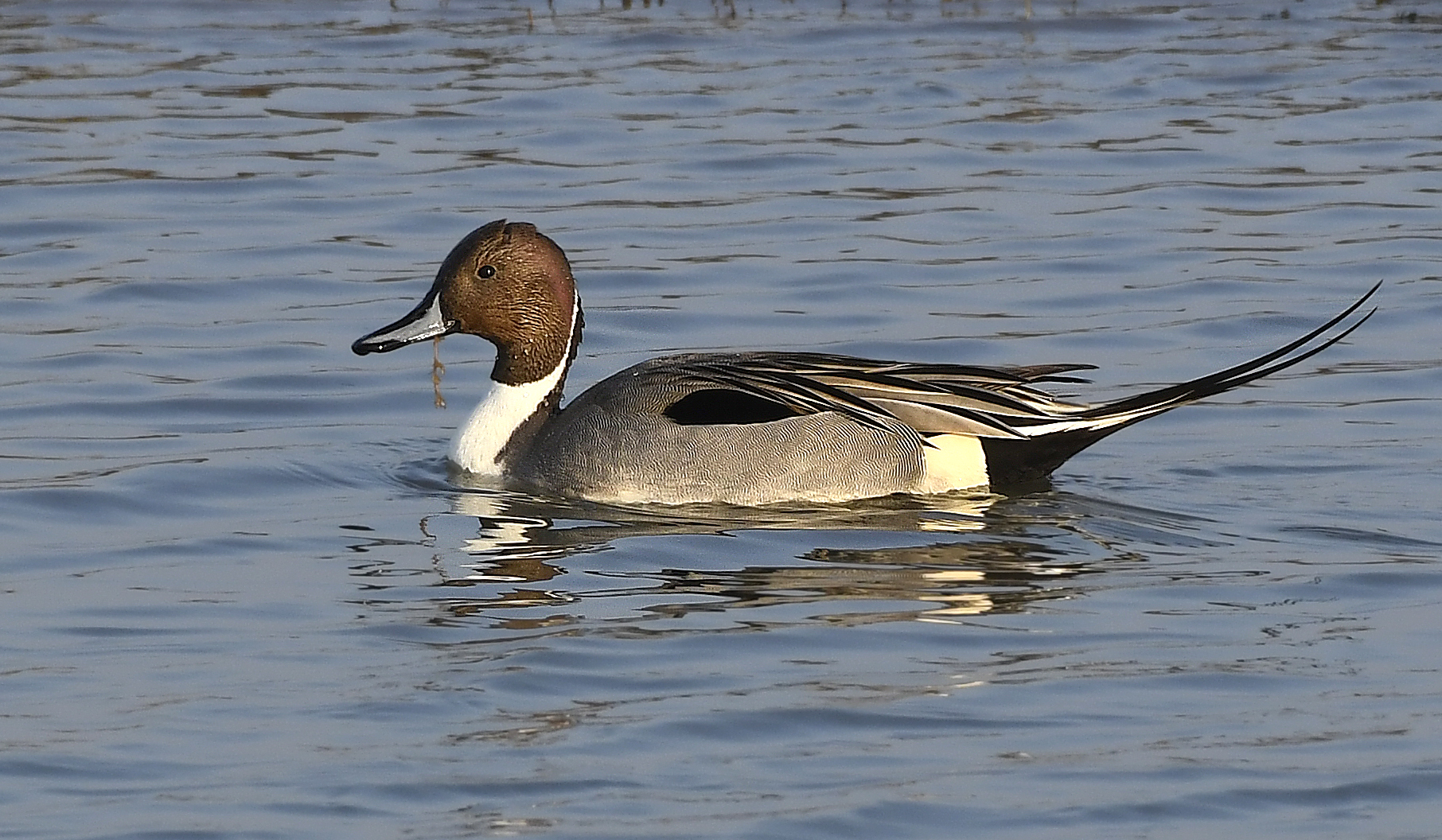
Male in Jamnagar, Gujarat, India

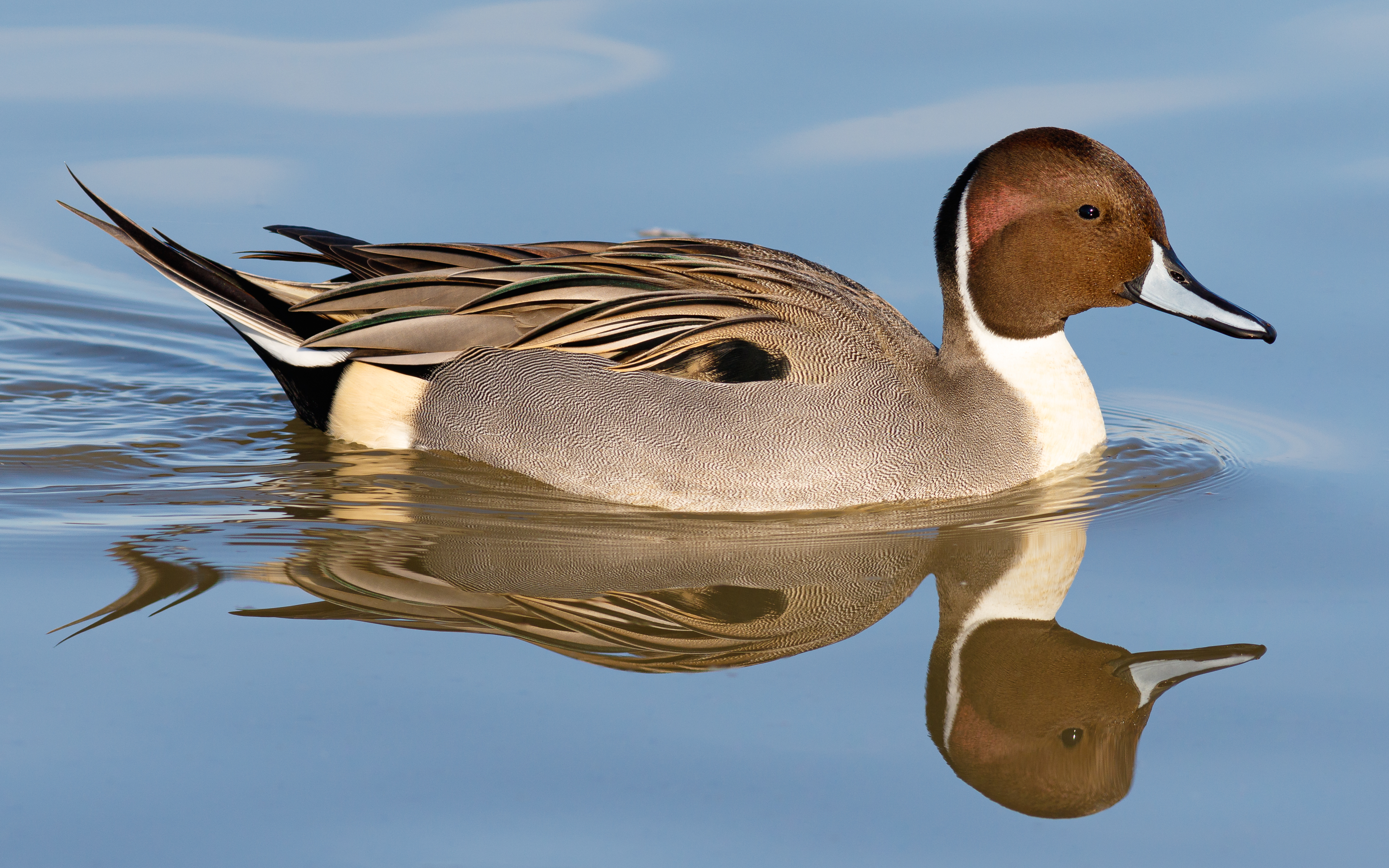
Male in California, U.S.

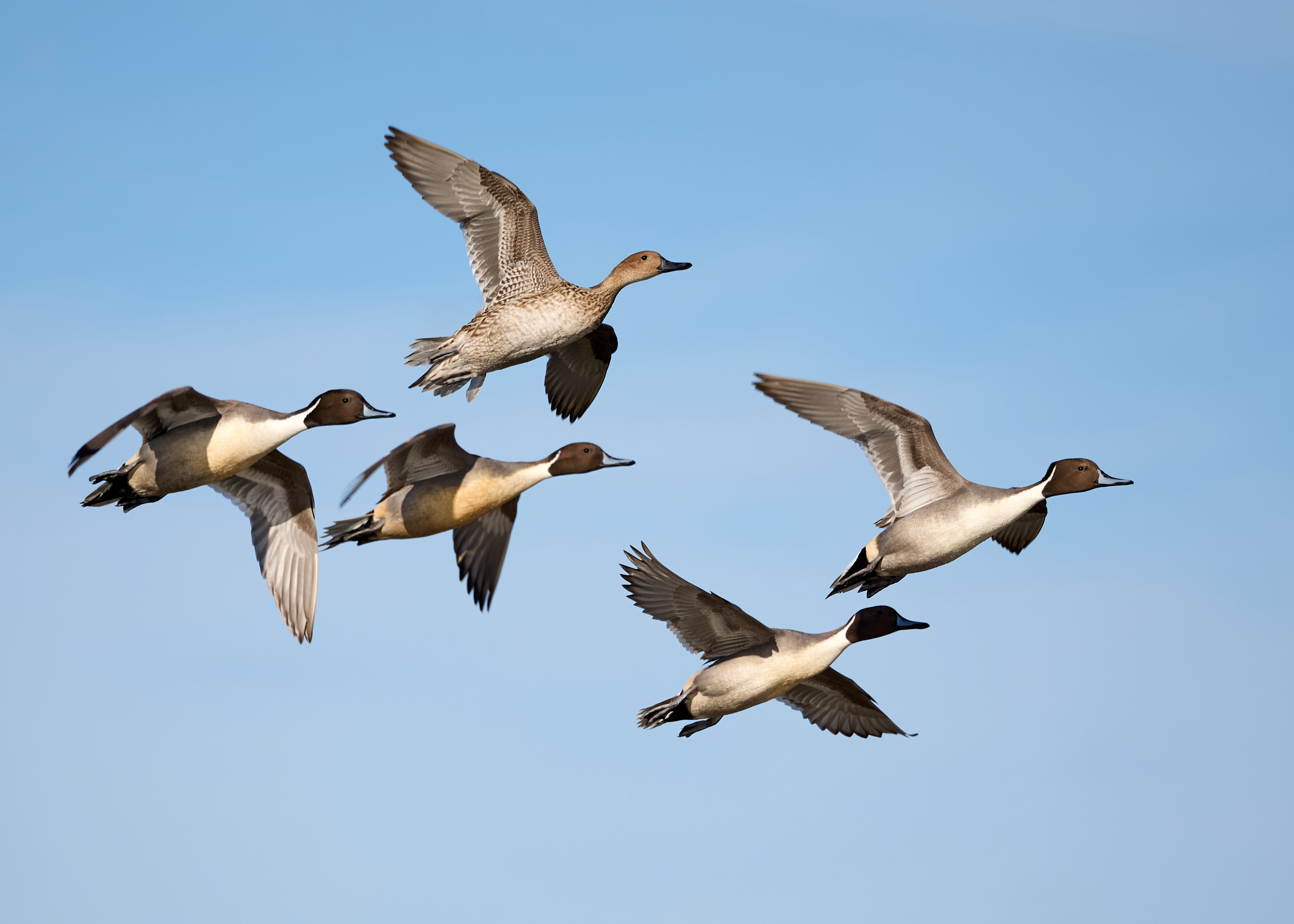
Four males and one female during a courtship flight in California

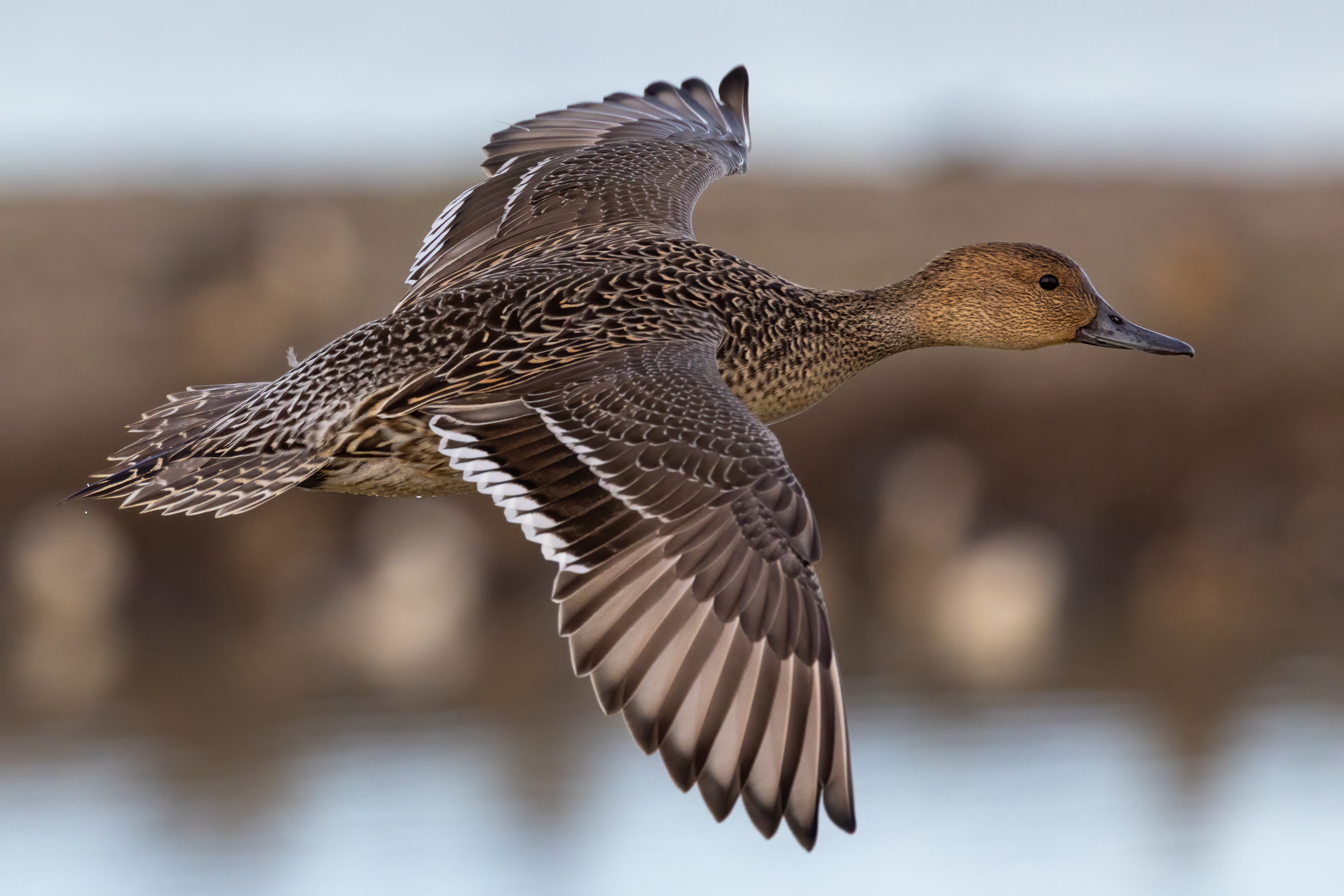
Female in flight, California

== Distribution and habitat ==
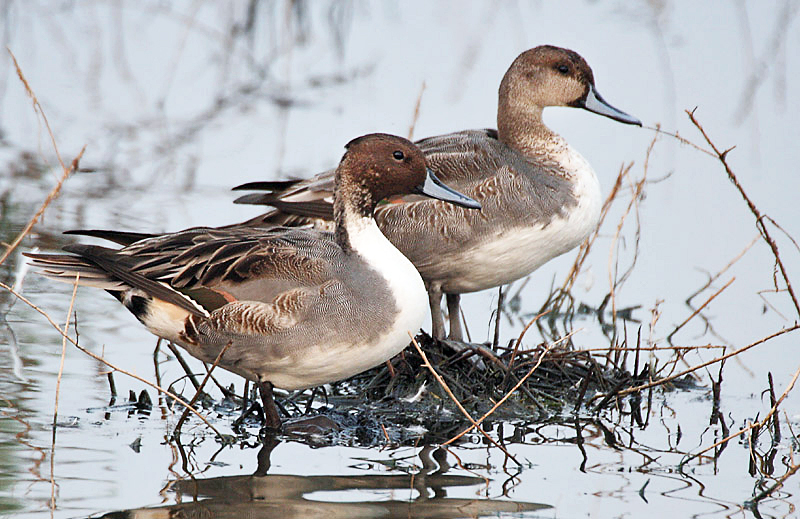
Non-breeding males wintering in India

This dabbling duck breeds in northern areas of the Palearctic as far south as about Poland and Mongolia, and in Canada, Alaska and the Midwestern United States. It winters mainly south of its breeding range, reaching almost to the equator in Panama, northern sub-Saharan Africa and tropical South Asia. Small numbers migrate to Pacific islands, particularly Hawaii, where a few hundred birds winter on the main islands in shallow wetlands and flooded agricultural habitats. Transoceanic journeys also occur: a bird that was caught and ringed in Labrador, Canada, was shot by a hunter in England nine days later, and Japanese-ringed birds have been recovered from six US states east to Utah and Mississippi. In parts of the range, such as Great Britain and the northwestern United States, the pintail may be present year-round.

The northern pintail's breeding habitat is open unwooded wetlands, such as wet grasslands, lake shores or tundra. In winter, it uses a wider range of open habitats, such as sheltered estuaries, brackish marshes and coastal lagoons. It is highly gregarious outside the breeding season, forming very large mixed flocks with other ducks.

== Behaviour ==
=== Breeding ===
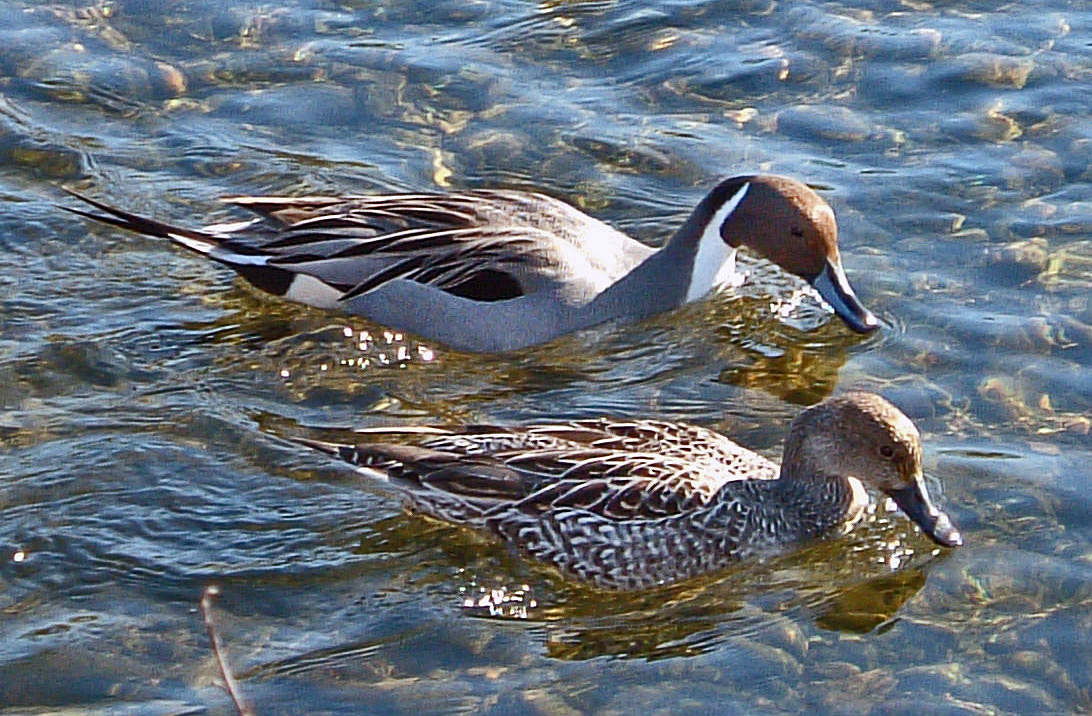
Breeding pair

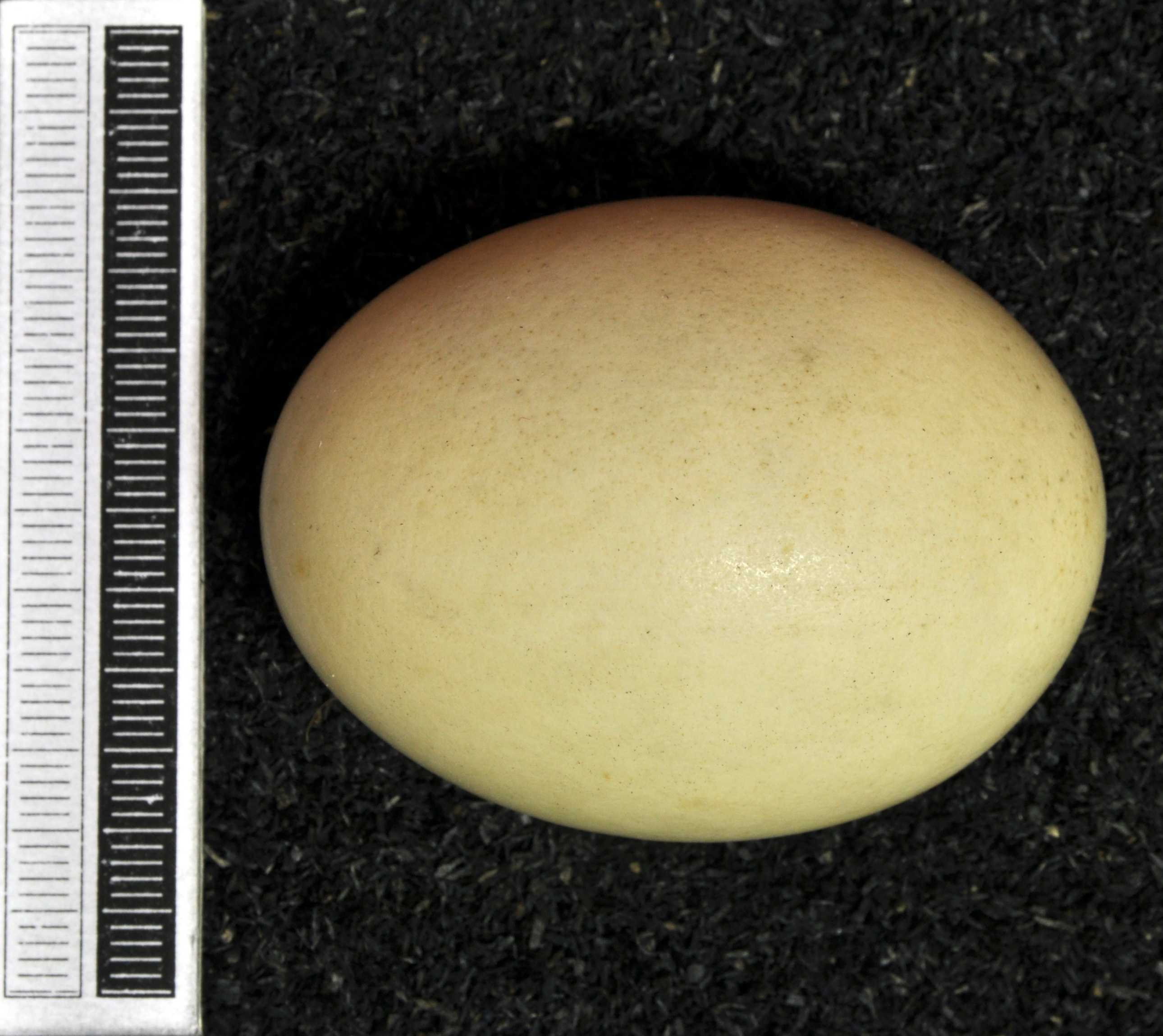
Egg, Collection Museum Wiesbaden

Both sexes reach sexual maturity at the age of one year. The male mates with the female by swimming close to her with his head down and tail up, whistling constantly. If there is a group of males, they will chase the female in flight until only one drake is left. The female prepares for copulation, which takes place in the water, by lowering her body; the male then bobs his head up and down and mounts the female, taking the feathers on the back of her head in his mouth. After copulation, he raises his head and back and whistles.

Among the earliest species to breed in the spring, northern pintails typically form pairs during migration, or even while still on wintering grounds. Breeding takes place between April and June, with the nest being constructed on the ground and hidden amongst vegetation in a dry location, often some distance from water. It is a shallow scrape on the ground lined with plant material and down. The female lays seven to nine cream-coloured eggs at the rate of one per day; the eggs are 55 mm × 38 mm (2.2 in × 1.5 in) in size and weigh 45 g (1.6 oz), of which 7% is shell. If predators destroy the first clutch, the female can produce a replacement clutch as late as the end of July. The hen alone incubates the eggs for 22 to 24 days before they hatch. The precocial downy chicks are then led by the female to the nearest body of water, where they feed on dead insects on the water surface. The chicks fledge in 46 to 47 days after hatching, but stay with the female until she has completed moulting.

About three-quarters of the chicks live long enough to fledge, but no more than half of these survive long enough to reproduce. The maximum recorded age is 27 years and 5 months for a Dutch bird.

=== Feeding ===
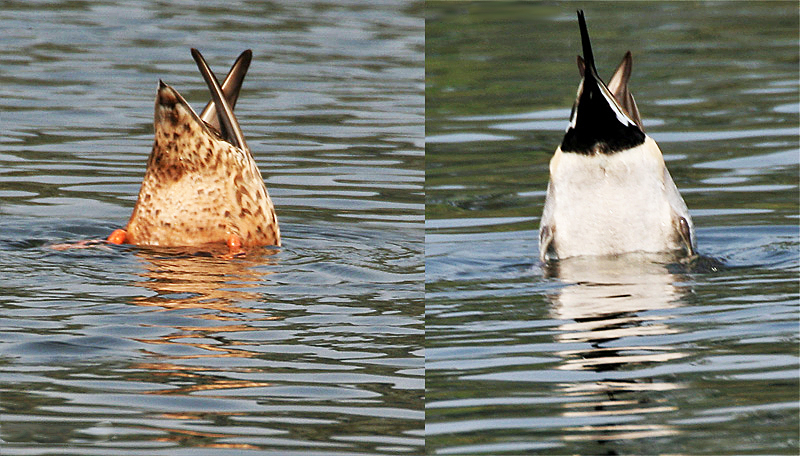
Up-ending to feed (male on right)

The pintail feeds by dabbling and upending in shallow water for plant food mainly in the evening or at night, and therefore spends much of the day resting. Its long neck enables it to take food items from the bottom of water bodies up to 30 cm (12 in) deep, which are beyond the reach of other dabbling ducks like the mallard.

The winter diet consists mainly of plant material including seeds and rhizomes of aquatic plants, but the pintail sometimes feeds on roots, grain and other seeds in fields, although less frequently than other Anas ducks. During the breeding season, this bird eats mainly invertebrate animals, including aquatic insects, molluscs and crustaceans.

== Health ==
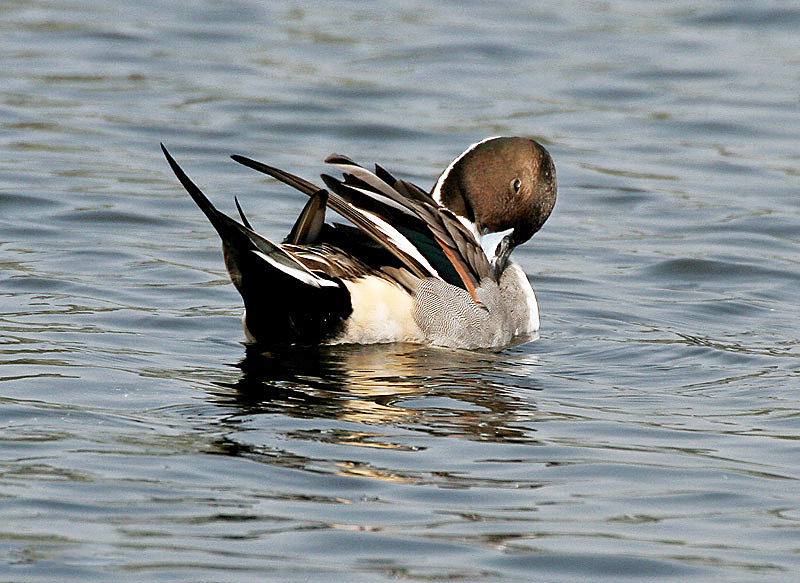
Male preening

Pintail nests and chicks are vulnerable to predation by mammals, such as foxes and badgers, and birds such as gulls, crows and magpies. The adults can take flight to escape terrestrial predators, but nesting females in particular may be surprised by large carnivores such as bobcats. Large birds of prey, such as northern goshawks, will take ducks from the ground, and some falcons, including the gyrfalcon, have the speed and strength to catch flying birds.

It is susceptible to a range of parasites including Cryptosporidium, Giardia, tapeworms, blood parasites and external feather lice, and is also affected by other avian diseases. It is often the dominant species in major outbreaks of avian botulism and avian cholera, and can also contract avian influenza, the H5N1 strain of which is highly pathogenic and occasionally infects humans.

The northern pintail is a popular game species due to its speed, agility, and excellent eating qualities, and is hunted throughout its range. Although one of the world's most numerous ducks, the combination of hunting and other factors has led to a decline in population numbers, and local hunting restrictions have been introduced at times to help conserve numbers.

This species' preferred habitat of shallow water is naturally susceptible to problems such as drought or the encroachment of vegetation, but this duck's habitat might be increasingly threatened by climate change. Populations are also affected by the conversion of wetlands and grassland to arable crops, depriving the duck of feeding and nesting areas. The timing of spring planting means that many nests of this early breeding duck are destroyed by farming activities, and as demonstrated by a Canadian study which showed that more than half of the surveyed nests were destroyed by agricultural work such as ploughing and harrowing.

Hunting with lead shot, in conjunction with the use of lead sinkers in angling, has been identified as a major cause of lead poisoning in waterfowl, which often feed on the bottom of lakes and wetlands where the shot collects. A Spanish study showed that northern pintail and common pochard were the species with the highest levels of lead shot ingestion, higher than in northern countries of the Western Palearctic Flyway, where lead shot is banned. In the United States, Canada, and many western European countries, all shot used for waterfowl must now be non-toxic, and therefore may not contain any lead.

== Status ==
The northern pintail has a large range, estimated at 41,900,000 km^{2} (16,200,000 sq mi), and a population estimated at 4.8–4.9 million individuals. The IUCN has classified the northern pintail as not being threatened globally, however it is endangered in Europe.

In the Palaearctic, there has been a decline in breeding populations across much of the region, including Russia, where the species has its population stronghold. In other regions, populations are either stable or fluctuating.

The pintail population in North America has been severely impacted by avian diseases, although the extent of this impact to other regions remains uncertain. Specifically, the breeding population fell from over 10 million in 1957 to 3.5 million in 1964. Although the species has recovered from that low point, the breeding population in 1999 was 30% below the long-term average, despite years of major recovery efforts. In 1997, an estimated 1.5 million water birds, most of them northern pintails, died from avian botulism during two outbreaks in Canada and Utah.

The northern pintail is one of the species to which the Agreement on the Conservation of African-Eurasian Migratory Waterbirds (AEWA) applies, but it has no special status under the Convention on International Trade in Endangered Species of Wild Fauna and Flora (CITES), which regulates international trade in specimens of wild animals and plants.
