= Nikumaroro =

Island in the western Pacific

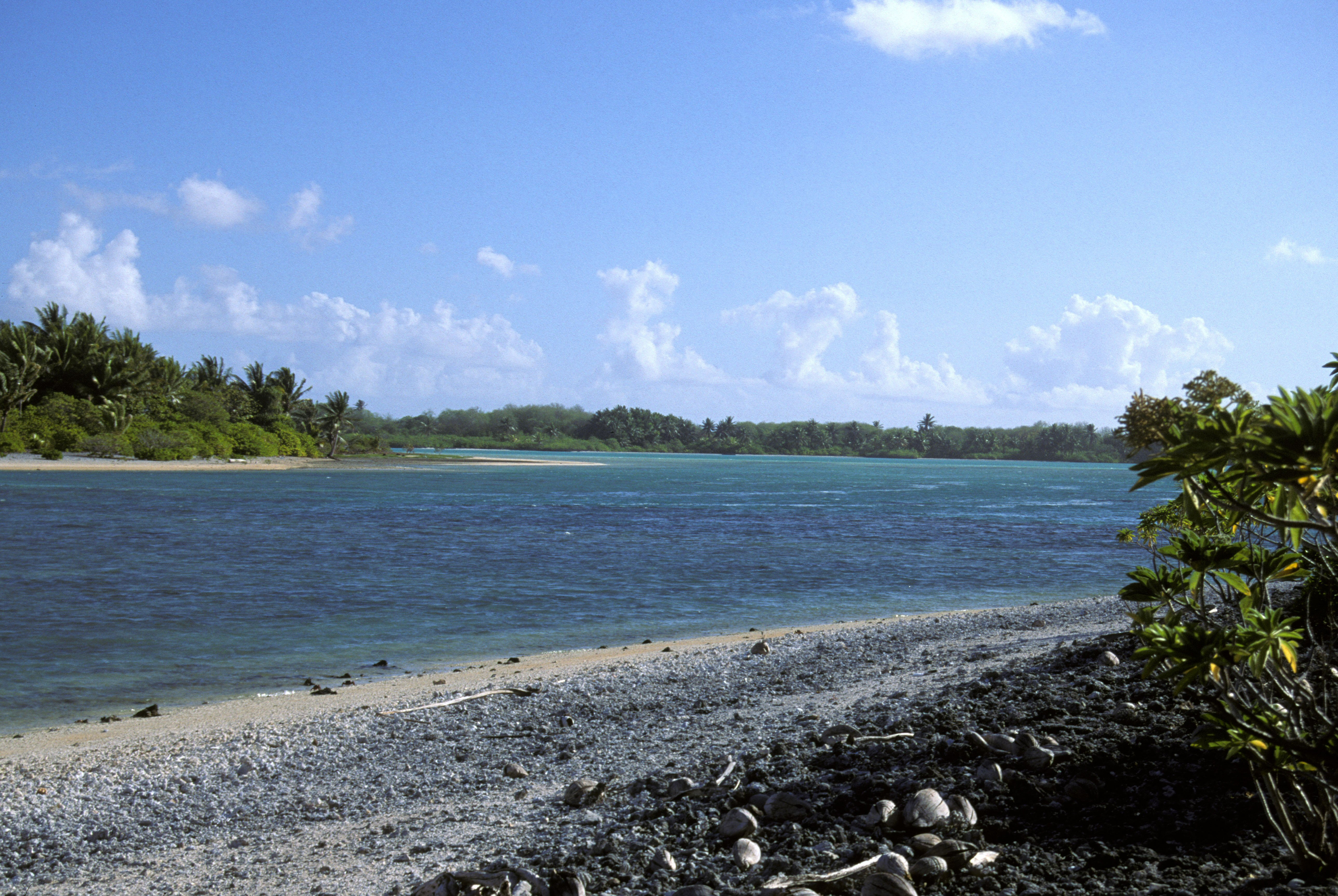
- Tatiman Passage (western entrance to Nikumaroro's lagoon) as seen from near Karake village ruins

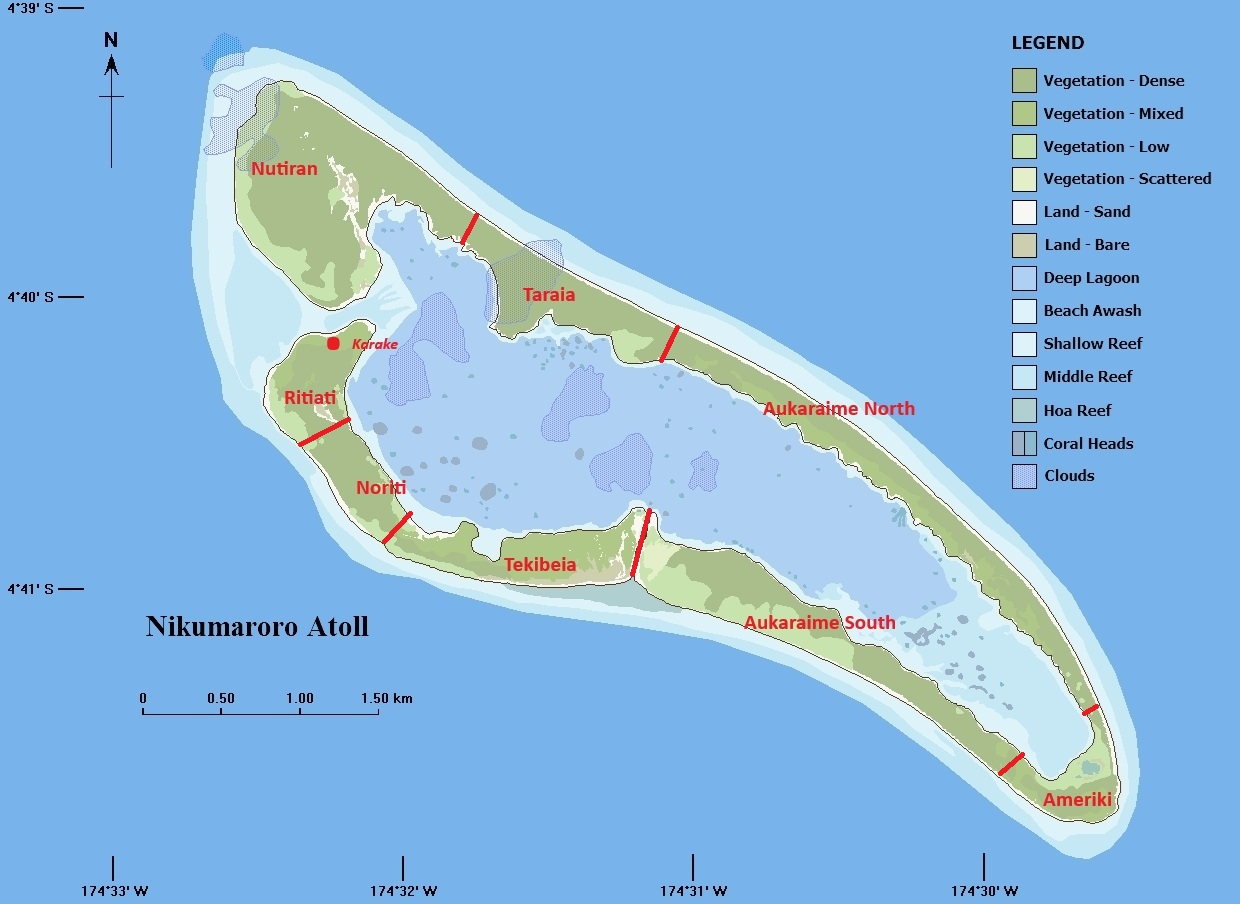
- Map of Nikumaroro, with subdivision in eight land units

- Location within Kiribati Location within Oceania

Geography
- Coordinates: 4°40′32″S 174°31′4″W
- Archipelago: Phoenix Islands
- Length: 6 km (3.7 mi)
- Width: 2 km (1.2 mi)

Administration
- Republic of Kiribati
- Phoenix Islands Protected Area

Demographics
- Population: 0

Nikumaroro, previously known as Kemins Island or Gardner Island, is a part of the Phoenix Islands, Kiribati, in the western Pacific Ocean. It is a remote, elongated, triangular coral atoll with profuse vegetation and a large central marine lagoon. Nikumaroro is about 7.5 km (4.7 mi) long by 2.5 km (1.6 mi) wide. Although occupied at various times during the past, the island is uninhabited today.

Kiribati declared the Phoenix Islands Protected Area in 2006, with the park being expanded in 2008. The 425,300-km^{2} (164,200-mi^{2}) marine reserve contains eight coral atolls including Nikumaroro.

Nikumaroro has notably been the focus of considerable speculation and exploration as a possible location where pilot Amelia Earhart and navigator Fred Noonan might have landed in July 1937 when they vanished during their ill-fated flight to circumnavigate the globe. However, to date, although trace artifactual and osteological evidence has emerged more consistent with the presence of an Euro-American woman castaway on the island than with other known prior inhabitants or castaways, no conclusive evidence of her plane or of Earhart's presence specifically has been found on or in the vicinity of the island.

== Features ==
The atoll's rim has two narrow entrances, Tatiman (pronounced as "tasiman" or "taziman") Passage, through which the tide runs, and Baureke Passage, which once held the tide but is now dry, both of which are bordered by a wide fringing reef, which forms a coral beach at low tide. The ocean beyond the reef is very deep, and the only anchorage is at the island's west end, across the reef from the ruins of a mid-20th-century British colonial village named Karake, but this is safe only with the southeast trade winds. Landing has always been difficult and is most often done south of the anchorage. On occasion, visiting larger boats and ships have moored alongside the wreck of the SS Norwich City, which ran aground in 1929.

== Geography ==
Thick scrub and Pisonia forest cover the land surface. The trees grow 15 m (49 ft) in height and result in decomposing leaf material in the soil. Coconut palms remain from the attempts to operate a plantation on the island from 1893 to 1894 and later from 1938 to 1963.

The scarcity of fresh water on Nikumaroro has proven problematic for residents in the past, and contributed directly to the failure of a British project to colonize the island from 1938 to 1963.

== Flora and fauna ==
=== Nikumaroro's flora and fauna ===
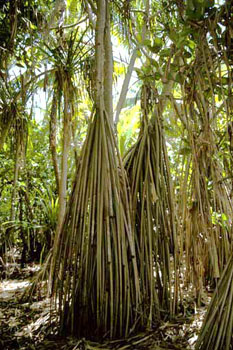
Large Pandanus sp. trees, viewed from underneath: Note the typical prop roots of the trees, enabling them to live along the coast, enduring violent seas and winds. They may have been planted as a food plant for the Phoenix Islands Settlement Scheme, 1938–1962.

Nikumaroro is sporadically visited by biologists attracted to its extensive marine and avian ecosystems. The atoll has populations of coconut crabs and migratory birds, and rats abound. Several species of sharks and bottlenose dolphins have been observed in the surrounding waters.

The island is part of the Phoenix Islands Protected Area, and as such, has been named an Important Bird Area, especially for its breeding colony of red-tailed tropicbirds.

=== Nikumaroro's reefs ===
The 2000 surveys done by David Obura and colleagues identified that the leeward sites on the reef had 25-40% Live Coral Cover (LCC), in some places exceeding 75% LCC on the shallow reef platforms. Coralline algae, Halimeda and coral rubble were the three other dominant cover categories. The windward sites on the reef had an estimated 70% LCC and the lower cover on the reef slope was 30% LCC. The steep slope was dominated by Halimeda with plates of Porites rus. In contrast to the leeward side, very little loose coral rubble was found with the majority of bare surfaces covered by encrusting coralline algae in shallow water. The most abundant coral species at Nikumaroro included: Acroporidae (staghorn corals); Acropora cytherea; Montipora efflorescens; Favites pentagona; Leptastrea purpurea; Pocillopora verrucosa; Pavona minuta and Pavona varians.

Nikumaroro is in a naturally iron-poor region. The introduction of iron to this environment from shipwrecks and anchor gear is linked to proliferation of turf algae and benthic bacterial communities, and degraded ‘black reefs’. Monitoring from 2000 to 2015 recorded the black reef originating at the 1929 wreck of the SS Norwich City on Nikumaroro progressing northward to sites 1 kilometre (1 mi) away.

== Pre-history ==
=== Evidence of prehistoric occupation ===
Little is known of habitation on the island prior to 1824. What evidence there is for pre-historic occupation is slim and unsubstantiated.

In 1989, an expedition to the island by TIGHAR suggested that what they believed to be fish traps on the shore of the island was indeed evidence of long forgotten Pacific natives. Also found by TIGHAR's work party was what was believed to be a basalt adze.

=== Identity of prehistoric peoples ===
The ancient settlements on nearby Manra and Orona Island were probably founded around 1000 BC, when eastern Melanesians are known to have travelled northwards across the water. These have yielded basalt artifacts that originated in Samoa, the Marquesas, and the Cook Islands, and were transported to the Phoenix and Line Islands during the 12th–14th centuries AD. There is evidence to suggest that Howland Island was the site of a prehistoric settlement, which may have extended down to Rawaki, Canton, Manra and Orona – and possibly Nikumaroro. Archaeological sites have been discovered on Manra and Orona that suggest there were two distinct groups of settlers in the area, one from eastern Polynesia, and one from Micronesia.

== History ==
=== 19th-century sightings and claims ===
Nikumaroro was known by sundry names during the early 19th century: Kemins' Island, Kemis Island, Motu Oonga, Motu Oona, and Mary Letitia's Island. The first record of a European sighting was made by Capt. C. Kemiss (or Kemin, Kemish) from the British whaling ship Eliza Ann in 1824. On 19 August 1840, the USS Vincennes of the U.S. Exploring Expedition confirmed its position and recorded the atoll's name as Gardner Island, originally given in 1825 by Joshua Coffin of the Nantucket whaler Ganges. Some sources say the island was named after U.S. Congressman Gideon Gardner, who owned the Ganges. (Note: Since other sources say that family member Joshua Gardner was captain of the Ganges at this time, either some confusion exists in the historical record or both Gardner and Coffin were on board when the island was sighted in 1825. (Dunmore 1992, p. 115))

In 1856, Nikumaroro was claimed as "Kemins Island" by CA Williams & Co. of New London, Connecticut, under the American Guano Islands Act. No record exists of guano deposits ever being exploited, however. On 28 May 1892, the island was claimed by the United Kingdom during a call by HMS Curacoa. Almost immediately, a licence was granted to Pacific entrepreneur John T. Arundel for planting coconuts. Twenty-nine islanders were settled there and some structures with corrugated iron roofs were constructed, but a severe drought resulted in the failure of this project within a year. In 1916, it was leased to a Captain E.F.H. Allen of the Samoa Shipping Trading Co Ltd, but remained uninhabited until 1938.

=== SS Norwich City wreck ===
During a storm on 29 November 1929, the SS Norwich City, a large unladen British freighter with a crew of 35 men, ran aground on the reef at the island's northwest corner. A fire broke out in the engine room and all hands abandoned ship in darkness through storm waves across the dangerous coral reef. There were 11 fatalities. The survivors camped near collapsed structures from the abortive Arundel coconut plantation and were rescued after several days on the island. The devastated wreck of the Norwich City was a prominent landmark on the reef for 70 years, although by 2007, only the ship's keel, engine, and two large tanks remained. A Digital Globe satellite image taken 15 November 2016 shows one of the two tanks pushed inland by wave action, and the engine is now gone.

=== Amelia Earhart ===
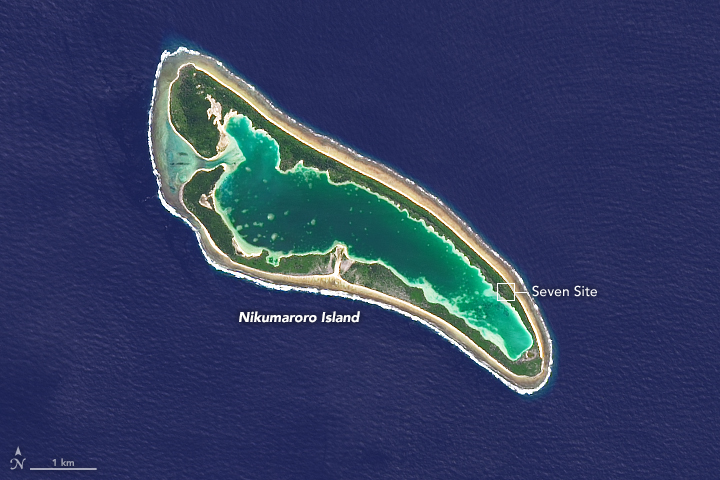
Nikumaroro Island in 2014

Amelia Earhart attempted her world flight in 1937, but she and navigator Fred Noonan disappeared on 2 July 1937 after the plane left Lae, New Guinea, and headed for Howland Island. Nikumaroro Island—then called Gardner Island—is about 640 kilometres (400 mi) southeast of Howland Island. During the subsequent search for them and their airplane, the United States Navy checked several nearby islands, and flew over Gardner Island, noting "signs of recent habitation", though they presumed the island was uninhabited. A British exploratory expedition visited Gardner Island in October 1937 but saw nothing. In September 1940, skeletal remains in the form of thirteen bones were found on the island that were believed by its chief administrator, Gerald Gallagher, to be "just possibly that of Amelia Earhardt [sic]". The bones were sent to Fiji, where Dr. D.W. Hoodless prepared a report that stated the bones were that of a male, a "short, stocky, muscular European, or even a half-caste, or person of mixed European descent."

A follow-up report in 2018 by forensic anthropologist Dr. Richard Jantz, who used modern forensic software, stated: "The bones are consistent with Earhart in all respects we know or can reasonably infer. Her height is entirely consistent with the bones. The skull measurements are at least suggestive of female...If the bones do not belong to Amelia Earhart, then they are from someone very similar to her.

The International Group for Historic Aircraft Recovery (TIGHAR) made several expeditions to Nikumaroro during the 1990s, 2000s, and 2010s. TIGHAR archaeologist Thomas King continued the field work with trips to the island in 2015 and 2017, sponsored by Betchart Expeditions. The group investigated the renewed hypothesis that Earhart and Noonan had landed on Gardner Island after they had failed to find Howland Island, and died as castaways.

TIGHAR hypothesized that Nikumaroro might have been the last stop on Earhart's world flight while assembling the catalog of radio messages received in the Pacific and elsewhere in the world during the Earhart search. Robert Brandenburg continued the analysis by using primary-port open-water constants from the U.K. Hydrographic Office to model hypothetical tides from Hull Island for Nikumaroro, using linear regression. He then drew vertical lines through the waves to mark the time of day that various radio signals were received, to correlate the times at which radio messages from Earhart were reported and the height of the tides. This was done to verify, or falsify, that it was possible for Earhart to send distress calls from Nikumaroro.

Critics, however, point to a number of flaws in Brandenburg's analysis. First, Brandenburg, in addition to plotting only signals deemed "Credible" by TIGHAR, used times for sunrise and sunset that were an hour too late, relying upon modern twilight references that account for changes to the International Date Line in 1994. Thus, he projected modern civil clock times back into 1937. The advanced clock meant that one signal in particular, that of Ray Havens, who provided coordinates he heard on his radio that were 107 miles from Nikumaroro, was judged as "Not Credible" due to the fact that it would have been received just after sunset when radio propagation is highly unlikely.

Other criticisms include the fact that Brandenburg's tidal analysis used unadjusted open-ocean data from primary ports in Suva, downscaled through linear constants to simulate Hull Island tides, adjusted again by linear regression to simulate Nikumaroro tides, rather than scaling his data to account for shallow-water hydrodynamic effects and the neap-to-spring tidal cycle. Because of these unscaled tidal heights, Brandenburg required the airplane to taxi to a location 17 inches (0.43 meters) higher than where it landed to prevent tides from washing out the transmitter. Had this adjustment not been made, the airplane would have washed off the reef by July 4 or even earlier.

Subsequent, independent data-forensic calibrations cleanly resolved these legacy errors without requiring excessive simulated hoisting of the aircraft. Remodeling the timeline through a 1D hydrodynamic sieve calculated from Courtier's 0.50 shallow-water form ratio demonstrated that accounting for local perched-water table retention preserves the aircraft's transmitter clearance for nearly a week. Furthermore, adjusting for the true 1937 solar horizon moves the calculated sunset an hour earlier, validating Ray Havens' 107-mile coordinate intercept as occurring entirely within viable atmospheric propagation windows.

TIGHAR also found and catalogued artifacts: U.S. beauty and skin-care products that may have dated to the 1930s, such as flakes of rouge and a shattered mirror from a woman's cosmetic compact, fragments of a cosmetic ointment pot encrusted with dried mercuric residue, parts of a folding pocket knife, traces of campfires bearing bird and fish bones, clams opened in the same way as oysters in New England, "empty shells laid out as if to collect rain water", and U.S. bottles dating from before World War II. What appeared to be the phalanx bone of a human finger had DNA tests done, but the tests were inconclusive as to whether it was turtle or human bone. A piece of aircraft-grade aluminium found on the island closely resembles a patch that is in photographs of Earhart's airplane.

The TIGHAR hypothesis has various advocates and critics, with TIGHAR's founder and executive director, Richard Gillespie, described as a good showman who lacks credible results. A curator at the Smithsonian Institution's Air and Space Museum said: "Not to impugn [Gillespie], but I don't think he's found anything on any expedition."

Ocean explorer Robert Ballard led a 2019 expedition to locate Earhart's Lockheed Model 10-E Electra or evidence that it landed on Nikumaroro. After days of searching the deep cliffs supporting the island and the nearby ocean, Ballard did not find any evidence of the plane or any associated wreckage of it. Allison Fundis, Ballard's chief operating officer stated: "We felt like if her plane was there, we would have found it pretty early in the expedition."

In their October 2019 documentary, Expedition Amelia tracing Robert Ballard's efforts, National Geographic stated regarding the Gardner Island (Nikumaroro) hypothesis, "It’s a nice story. But like all the other evidence obtained here over the decades, there is no provable link to Amelia or her plane."

Archaeological Legacy Institute and Purdue Research Foundation planned to conduct an expedition to the lagoon in November 2025 to examine a "visual anomaly" in satellite images of a lagoon on Nikumaroro, dubbed the Taraia Object. The expedition was postponed until 2026, awaiting approvals from the Kiribati government. On the 10th October 2026 the expedition set off, with the expectation of arriving at the island on the 13th October. On October 19, the group announced that they found no evidence to confirm this hypothesis and concluded that it was likely large tree deposits along the peninsula’s sandspit. Upon arrival, the team found that a good portion of the debris had fragmented and washed away, leaving only a single Y-shaped segment — a fraction of the anomaly’s original size. The fragment’s reflective surface, long associated with the idea that it was a metal object on the image, was due to its carbonate veneer coating. The team also recovered similarly coated objects that contained shiny concretized amalgam of coral sand.

=== British settlement scheme ===
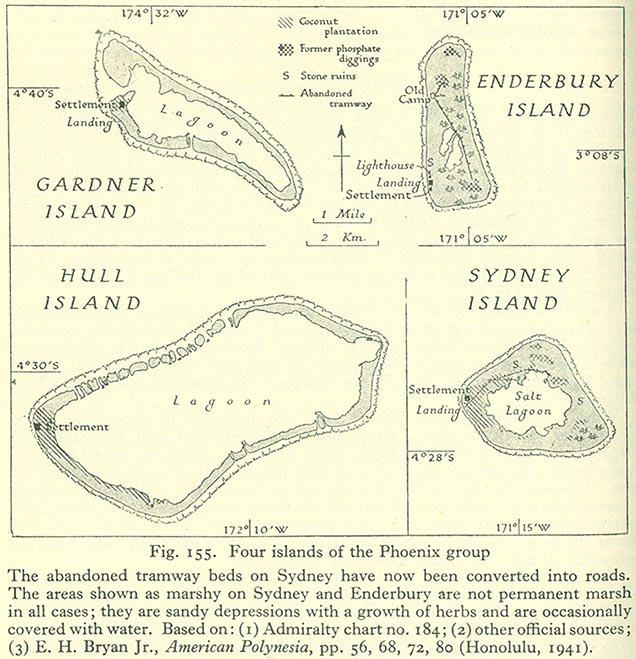
Gardner and other islands of the Phoenix Group, from a geographical handbook compiled by the British Admiralty in 1943-1945

On 1 December 1938, members of the British Pacific Islands Survey Expedition arrived to evaluate the island as a possible location for either seaplane landings or an airfield. On 20 December, more British officials arrived with 20 Gilbertese settlers in the last colonial expansion of the British Empire (other than formal annexations preparatory to withdrawal, etc.). (Note: The document contains a detailed description of the British Pacific Islands Survey Expedition. See "The Colonization of the Phoenix Islands." TIGHAR via tighar.org, 2007. Retrieved: 25 October 2009.)

The British colonial officer Gerald Gallagher established a headquarters of the Phoenix Islands Settlement Scheme in the village located on the island's western end, on the south side of the largest entrance to the lagoon. (Note: The reference source provides a brief history of Gallagher and the Phoenix Island Settlement Scheme. See "Gallagher of Nikumaroro: The Last Expansion of the British Empire." TIGHAR via tighar.org, 2007. Retrieved: 25 October 2009.) Efforts to clear land and plant coconuts were hindered by a lack of drinking water. By June 1939, a few wells had been successfully established and 58 I-Kiribati were on Gardner, comprising 16 men, 16 women, and 26 children. Wide coral-gravel streets and a parade ground were laid out and important structures included a thatched administration house, a wood-frame cooperative store, and a radio shack. Gallagher died and was buried on the island in 1941.

At his mother's request, Gallagher's remains were moved to Tarawa for reburial and the memorial plaque was retrieved. Although reasons cited for giving up on the struggling colony included unstable water lenses and uncertain copra markets, observers familiar with the colony's history remarked that after Gallagher's death a "will" or "nerve" to succeed seemed to vanish from the settlements.

From 1944 through 1945, the United States Coast Guard operated a navigational LORAN station with 25 crewmen on the southeastern tip of Gardner, installing an antenna system, Quonset huts, and some smaller structures. Only scattered debris remains on the site.

The island's population reached a high of about 100 by the mid-1950s, but by the early 1960s, periodic drought and an unstable freshwater lens had thwarted the struggling colony. Nikumaroro (together with Manra and Orona) was evacuated by the British government in 1963. Its residents were evacuated to the Solomon Islands by the British, and by 1965, Gardner was officially uninhabited.

The Gardner Island Post Office opened around 1939 and closed around January 1964.

=== Kiribati ===
In 1971, the UK granted self-rule to the Gilbert Islands, which achieved complete independence in 1979 as Kiribati. That same year, the United States, after having recently surveyed the island for possible weapons testing, relinquished any claims to Gardner through the Treaty of Tarawa. The island was officially renamed Nikumaroro, a name inspired by Gilbertese legends and used by the settlers during the 1940s and 1950s.

== Island folklore ==
=== Nei Manganibuka ===
The current name for the Island, Nikumaroro, comes from the name of a legendary goddess of the Gilbertese people, "Nei Manganibuka". It is said that she comes from Samoa, is associated with the Buka tree, and first taught the Gilbertese canoe craft along with the lore of ocean navigation. Nikumaroro was named by the natives who accompanied the British during a visit to the island in 1938. In Tungaru (Gilbertese), “Nei” is roughly the equivalent of Miss or Ms, and “Manganibuka” means “old woman of the Buka trees.”

In an interview in 1997, Risasi Finikaso, who lived in Nikumaroro as a child, remarked of a place called Niurabo which was sacred to Nei Manganibuka.

=== Ghost Maneaba ===
According to legend, the wife of Teng Koata, the first island leader of Nikumaroro, had been walking along the north-western part of the island when she saw a "great and perfect maneaba". It is said that this was the maneaba of Nei Manganibuka, whom she saw sitting under its high thatched roof. Nei Manganibuka was seated with two children, and conversing with three ancients about the happy future of Nikumaroro and how it would one day support thousands of inhabitants. In later years this spot became known as Ghost Maneaba, though the area is now known as Kanawa Point.

== See also ==
- List of Guano Island claims
- List of islands
- Desert island
- Phoenix Islands
