= SS Norwich City =

British cargo steamship that was built in 1911 and wrecked in 1929

History

United Kingdom
- Name: 1911: Normanby; 1919: Norwich City
- Namesake: 1911: Normanby; 1919: Norwich City F.C.
- Owner: 1911: London & Northern SS Co; 1917: St Just SS Co; 1929: Reardon Smith Line
- Operator: 1911: Pyman Brothers; 1917: Wm Reardon Smith & Sons
- Port of registry: 1911: London; 1919: Bideford
- Builder: Wm Gray & Co, West Hartlepool
- Yard number: 792
- Laid down: 9 February 1911
- Launched: 12 July 1911
- Completed: August 1911
- Identification: UK official number 132596; code letters HTJF
- Fate: Grounded, 29 November 1929

General characteristics
- Tonnage: 4,219 GRT, 2,598 NRT
- Displacement: 8,730 tons
- Length: 397.0 ft (121.0 m)
- Beam: 53.5 ft (16.3 m)
- Depth: 23.0 ft (7.0 m)
- Decks: 1
- Installed power: 412 NHP
- Propulsion: 1 × screw; 1 × triple-expansion engine
- Speed: 11 knots (20 km/h)
- Crew: 35
- Armament: First World War: DEMS
- Notes: sister ship: Cloughton

SS Norwich City was a British cargo steamship. It was built in 1911 as Normanby, and renamed Norwich City in 1919. It was wrecked in the Pacific Ocean in 1929. For many years, its wreck was a sea mark on the atoll of Nikumaroro. The wreck is now largely broken up.

== Building ==
In 1911, Pyman Brothers, a ship management company based in London, had a pair of cargo ships built at shipyards on the River Tees. William Gray & Company at West Hartlepool built Normanby as yard number 792. It was laid down on 9 February 1911, launched on 12 July, and completed that August. Richardson, Duck and Company at Thornaby-on-Tees built its sister ship Cloughton as yard number 620, launching it on 9 September and completing it that October. The ships were named after the villages of Normanby and Cloughton on the coast of the North Riding of Yorkshire.

Normanby's registered length was 397.0 ft (121.0 m), its beam was 53.5 ft (16.3 m) and its depth was 23.0 ft (7.0 m). It had six holds for cargo. Its tonnages were 4,219 GRT and 2,598 NRT.

It had a single screw, driven by a three-cylinder triple-expansion steam engine built by William Gray's Central Marine Engine Works. It was rated at 412 NHP, and gave it a speed of 11 knots (20 km/h).

== Management, registry and ownership ==
Normanby's first owner was Pyman Brothers' London and Northern Steamship Company. She was registered in London. Her United Kingdom official number was 132596 and her code letters were HTJF.

In 1917, William Reardon Smith's St Just Steamship Company bought eight of London and Northern's ships, including Normanby and Cloughton. In 1919 Reardon Smith renamed the ships Norwich City and Orient City respectively, and registered them in Bideford in Devon. In 1929 the St Just Steamship Co was renamed Reardon Smith Line.

By 1919, Norwich City was equipped with wireless telegraphy. By 1924, her furnaces had been converted to oil fuel.

== 1928 collision ==
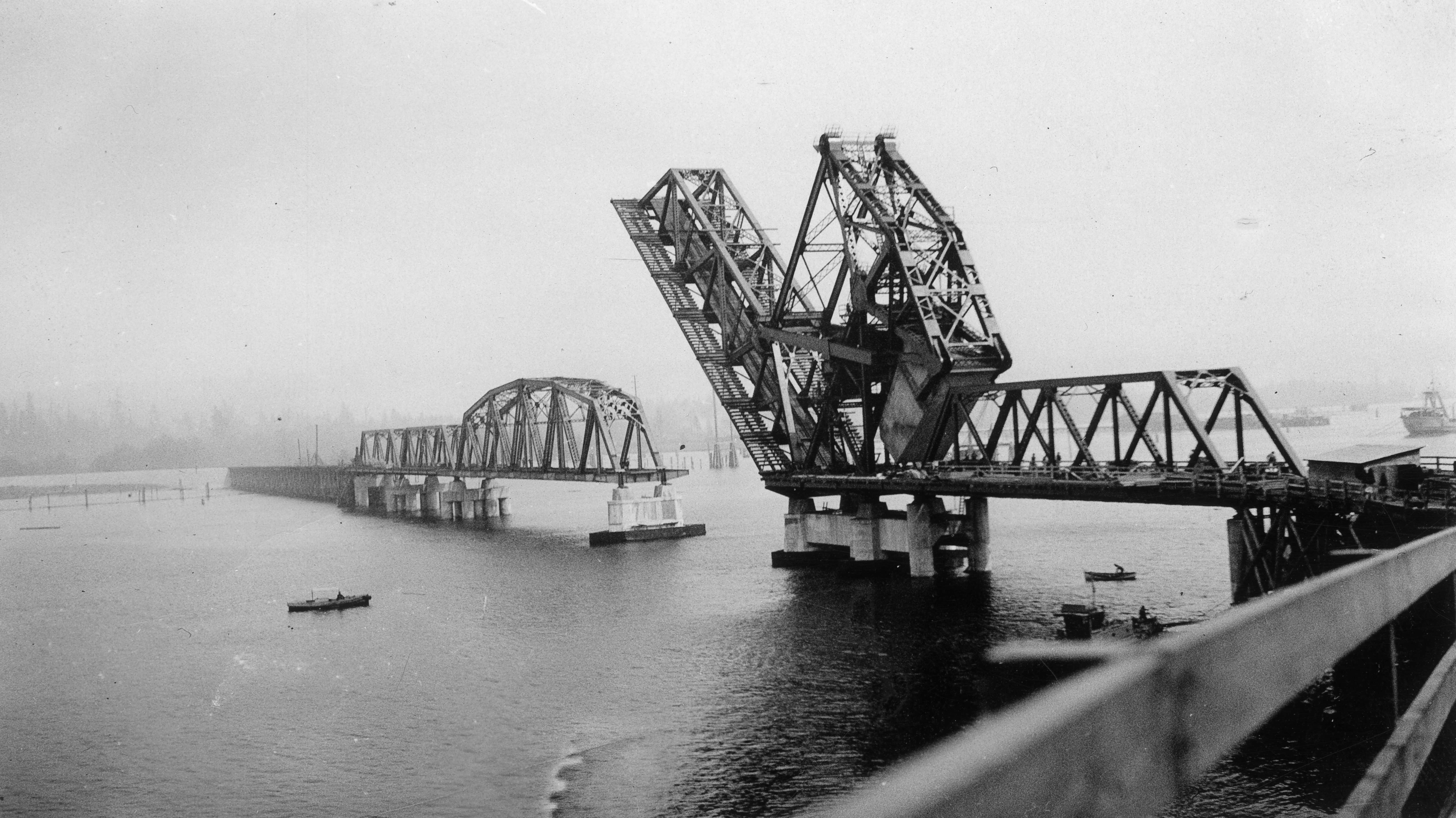
The original Second Narrows Rail Bridge

On 23 April 1928, Norwich City collided with the original Second Narrows Rail Bridge in Vancouver, which at that time was a bascule bridge. She lost her masts and funnel, and her superstructure was damaged. The Burrard Dry Dock Company repaired her.

This was the 18th incident with the bridge since it had been built in 1925. Shipping companies sued the bridge company, and the Privy Council found in their favour.

== Loss ==
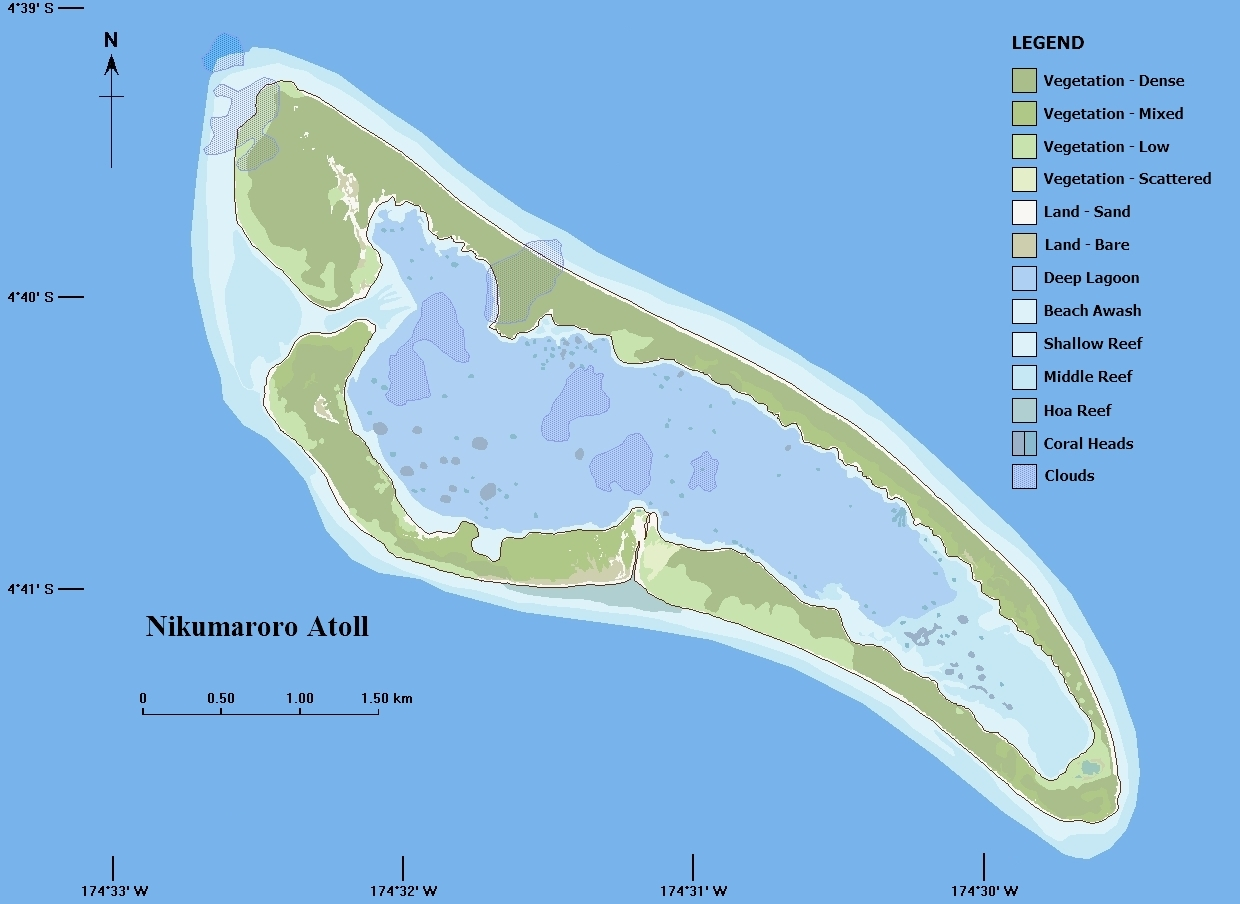
Map of Nikumaroro atoll

On 16 November 1929, Norwich City left Melbourne in ballast for Vancouver via Honolulu. In a storm at night on 29 November she was driven off course. At 2305 hrs that night she ran aground on a coral reef at position 4°39′39″S 174°32′40″W off Gardner Island, now Nikumaroro, which is an uninhabited atoll in the Phoenix Islands.

Her master, Captain Daniel Hamer, ordered that the ship's two lifeboats be prepared for launching, but not yet lowered into the water. He sent his Second Officer, Henry Lott, to check the condition of the ship's cargo holds. Lott reported that holds 1, 2, 3 and 4 were dry, there was water in hold 6, and water was starting to enter hold 5. Captain Hamer feared that the ship could break her back. He ordered everyone to stay near the galley, and no-one to go forward of the funnel, in order to be near the lifeboats case they needed to abandon ship.

Later, Lott discovered that a fire had started in hold 3. He reported this to the engineers, who discovered that the engine room was on fire. The ship's lee side was starboard, so the starboard lifeboat was lowered until it was level with her gunwale. The port side was exposed to the storm, so it was planned to lower the port lifeboat and then tow it to the starboard side. But as the boat was lowered, a "huge wave" bent one of the davits and swept away the port lifeboat. At the same time, about 0430 hrs, Captain Hamer was swept overboard and fell about 40 feet (12 m) into the sea. He tried to swim back to his ship, but the surf swept him away from the ship and toward the shore. Unable to return to his ship, Hamer found himself in shallow water and waded ashore.

Aboard Norwich City, the chief officer, J Thomas, took command, and ordered that the starboard lifeboat be lowered into the water and towed clear of the fire. His plan was for the crew to remain on the ship until dawn, but explosions started below decks, so he gave the order to abandon ship. The crew boarded the starboard boat, and were just ready to let go the lines, when a wave swept the boat aft and capsized it, throwing everyone into the water.

Eleven men were killed, either by drowning, being dashed by the heavy sea against the coral reef, or sharks. They were the third engineer, fourth engineer, steward, ship's carpenter, one ordinary seaman, and six Arab firemen. Survivors either swam ashore or were swept ashore by the sea. Both lifeboats washed ashore. Four men were trapped under the capsized starboard boat. One drowned, but other survivors cut open the bottom of the boat and rescued the three men who were still alive.

The boats were provisioned with survival rations, including drinking water, hardtack, canned corned beef, and condensed milk, which the survivors retrieved. They buried three men ashore: the steward, an Arab who had been trapped under the capsized boat, and later the ship's carpenter. Bodies of the other eight men were never found. The beach was exposed, so the survivors took the provisions about 100 yards (91 m) inland, where they made a camp, sheltered by the lifeboats' sails. Second Officer Lott and some of the men explored the atoll, and found a pond and coconuts. The pond water was brackish, so it was boiled before drinking.

== Rescue ==
When Norwich City ran aground, her wireless telegraphist, T Clark, almost immediately started transmitting distress messages, but there was very bad static. After three hours, he got a reply from the wireless telegraph station in Apia in Western Samoa, 575 nautical miles (1,065 km) away. He remained at his post until he had to go to his boat station to abandon ship. In his final message, he told Apia that Norwich City was on fire.

A British cargo steamship, Turnbull, Scott and Co's Trongate, was in port at Apia. At 0600 hrs on 30 November she was ordered to raise steam, ready to go to Gardner Island to rescue survivors. For the rescue she embarked a surfboat with a crew of six indigenous islanders: a coxswain from Tuvalu, four boatmen from Niue, and one boatman from Tokelau. She sailed at 1400 hrs that day. On 2 December she liaised with a Norwegian motor tanker, T Dannevig's Lincoln Ellsworth. On the morning of 3 December the two ships arrived off Gardner Island, and Trongate sent the islanders ashore in their surfboat, carrying provisions for the survivors.

However, crossing the reef on that part of the coast was hazardous even with a surfboat. The islanders were concerned that if the boat capsized, all of its occupants would be at risk from sharks. They took the surfboat to the lee side of the island, about 1 1/2 miles (2.4 km) south of the wreck, but the sea there was not much calmer. They made one trip, taking three survivors out beyond the reef, where they were transferred to one of Trongate's lifeboats. The three men were the second engineer, wireless operator, and cabin boy. On the islanders' recommendation, the rescue operation was suspended until the next day. The islanders caught land crabs and seabirds for food, and lit a fire after the survivors had run out of matches.

On 4 December, sea conditions were a little better, but the islanders took the remaining survivors off the atoll. They made several trips with their surfboat, taking three survivors on each trip. Beyond the reef, they transferred them to Lincoln Ellsworth's motor launch. Lincoln Ellsworth embarked 12 survivors, including Captain Hamer. She made for Sydney, where the survivors transferred to the Clan Line ship Clan Graham, which left on 7 December for Britain. Trongate embarked the other 12, and returned to Apia, where she arrived on 7 December, and two of the Arab survivors were hospitalised.

On 29 December 1929, representatives of the Board of Trade in Apia held a court of inquiry into the loss of the ship. Both Second Officer Lott and Trongate's master told the court that the rescue would have been impossible without the islanders, and the skill and bravery with which they handled their surfboat. The court unanimously concurred. The Royal Humane Society of Australasia awarded each of the indigenous boatmen £5 for their boatmanship in the rescue. The award was presented by administrator of the Gilbert and Ellice Islands, Colonel HH Allen.

== Wreck ==
Norwich City's wreck remained a sea mark on the reef for decades. However, by 1989, only her keel, engine, two bunker tanks, and one of her boilers remained. By 2010, the boiler had gone, and by 2016 her engine had also disappeared. The sea detached both bunker tanks from the wreck, driving them shoreward.

== See also ==
- Speculation on the disappearance of Amelia Earhart and Fred Noonan, of which one hypothesis is that the duo landed on a reef near Norwich City

== Bibliography ==
- "Crew List of the S.S. Norwich City". Board of Trade. 1929 – via Ameliapedia. – at the foot of the webpage, below the statement of First Officer J Thomas
- Fenton, Roy (October 2018). "Reardon Smith: Forging a Reputation in Cardiff Shipping". Ships Monthly. pp. 46–50.
- Hamer, Daniel (1929). "Statement of Daniel Hamer, Master, S.S. Norwich City". Board of Trade – via Ameliapedia.
- Lott, Henry Cleveland (1929). "Statement of Henry Cleveland Lott, Second Officer, S.S. Norwich City". Board of Trade – via Ameliapedia.
- Lloyd's Register of British and Foreign Shipping. Vol. II.–Steamers. London: Lloyd's Register of Shipping. 1912 – via Internet Archive.
- Lloyd's Register of Shipping. Vol. II.–Steamers. London: Lloyd's Register of Shipping. 1919 – via Internet Archive.
- Lloyd's Register of Shipping. Vol. II.–Steamers and Motorships. London: Lloyd's Register of Shipping. 1924 – via Internet Archive.
- Mercantile Navy List. London. 1913 – via Crew List Index Project.
- Mercantile Navy List. London. 1920 – via Crew List Index Project.
- Swindell, John Harry (1929). "Statutory declaration of J.H. Swindell, Master, S.S. Trongate". Board of Trade – via Ameliapedia.
- Thomas, J. (1929). "Statement of J. Thomas, First Officer, S.S. Norwich City". Board of Trade – via Ameliapedia.
