= Arariki =

Former settlement on Orona atoll, part of Phoenix Islands, Kiribati

Coordinates: 4°31′S 172°13′W

Arariki is a former settlement on the western side of Orona, a remote atoll in the Phoenix Islands group and part of the Republic of Kiribati.

== History ==
It was founded in December 1938 by Henry Evans Maude, a British colonial officer, as one of the three villages established by the Phoenix Islands Settlement Scheme after the group were annexed into the Gilbert and Ellice Islands colony in 1937. Maude named the settlement in honour of his son, Alaric (later Prof. Alaric Maude of Flinders University), and left an initial group of ten Gilbertese colonists from the overpopulated Gilbert Islands. They were later joined by a further seventy-five settlers in April 1939 and three further groups in 1940 bringing the total population to 394 before the Second World War hindered any further expansion. By the end of 1940 Arariki had become a successful self-sustaining island community under its own native governance and by 1951 the population had grown to around 560. As the population grew, drought meant the settlements struggled to remain sustainable and all three were evacuated by the British colonial authorities in 1963.
