= Orona =

Pacific island of Kiribati

Coordinates: 4°30′S 172°10′W

Native name: Hull Island
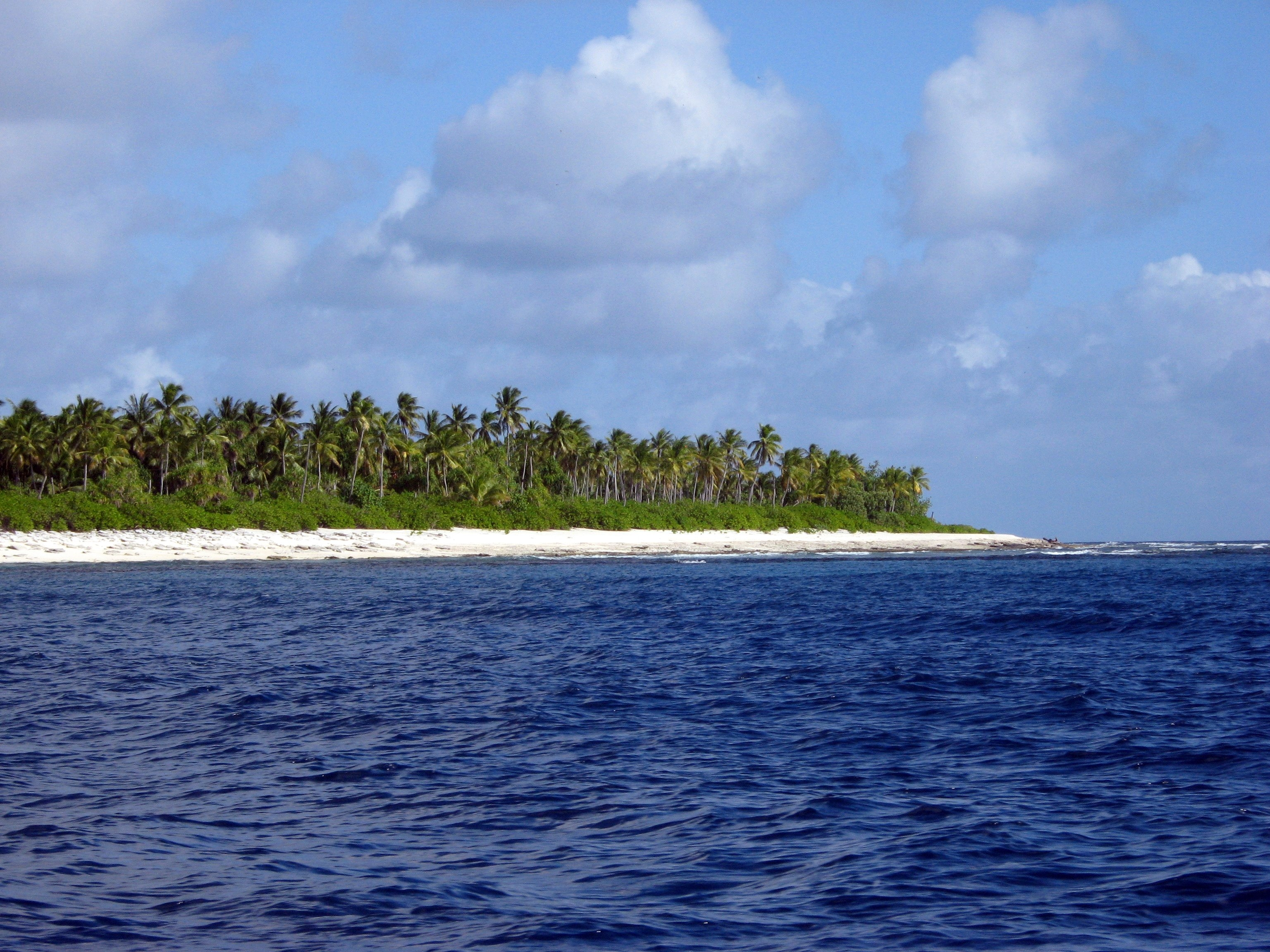
- Lush Orona Island, part of the remote Phoenix Islands Protected Area

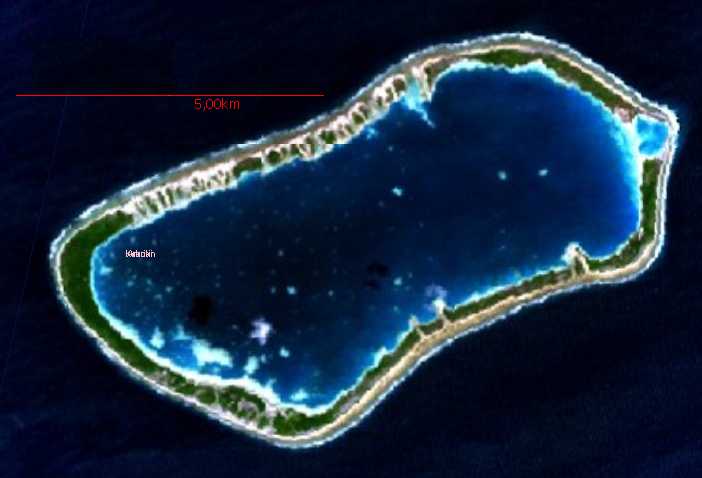
- NASA Satellite Imagery

Geography
- Archipelago: Phoenix Islands
- Area: 3.9 km^{2} (1.5 sq mi)

Administration
- Kiribati

Demographics
- Population: 0

Orona atoll, also known as Hull Island, is one of the Phoenix Islands in the Republic of Kiribati. It measures approximately 8.8 km (5 mi) by 4 km (2 mi), and like Kanton, is a narrow ribbon of land surrounding a sizable lagoon with depths of 15–20 metres (49–66 ft). Numerous passages connect the lagoon to the surrounding ocean, only a couple of which will admit even a small boat. Total land area is 3.9 km^{2} (2 sq mi), and the maximum elevation is nine metres.

Kiribati declared the Phoenix Islands Protected Area in 2006, with the park being expanded in 2008. The 164,200-square-mile (425,300-square-kilometer) marine reserve contains eight coral atolls including Orano.

Although occupied at various times during the past, including as late as 2004, Orona is uninhabited today.

== Flora and fauna ==
=== Orona's flora and fauna ===
Like Manra, Orona is covered with coconut palms (mostly on the western side), towering 12–18 metres (39–59 ft) above the surface. The remainder of the atoll is covered with scrub forest, herbs, and grasses, with a maximum height of 6–12 metres (20–39 ft). Feral cats exist on the island, together with rats, pigs, and dogs. Ducks and chickens were raised by the former inhabitants, but it is unknown whether any remain. Orona also boasts three species of lizards, land and hermit crabs, together with approximately fifty species of insects. Turtles are also known to use the island as a nesting area.

A survey of Orona carried out in 2006 did not detect rats. However, Polynesian rats were located on the island in 2009, as well as more than 20 cats.

=== Orona's reefs ===
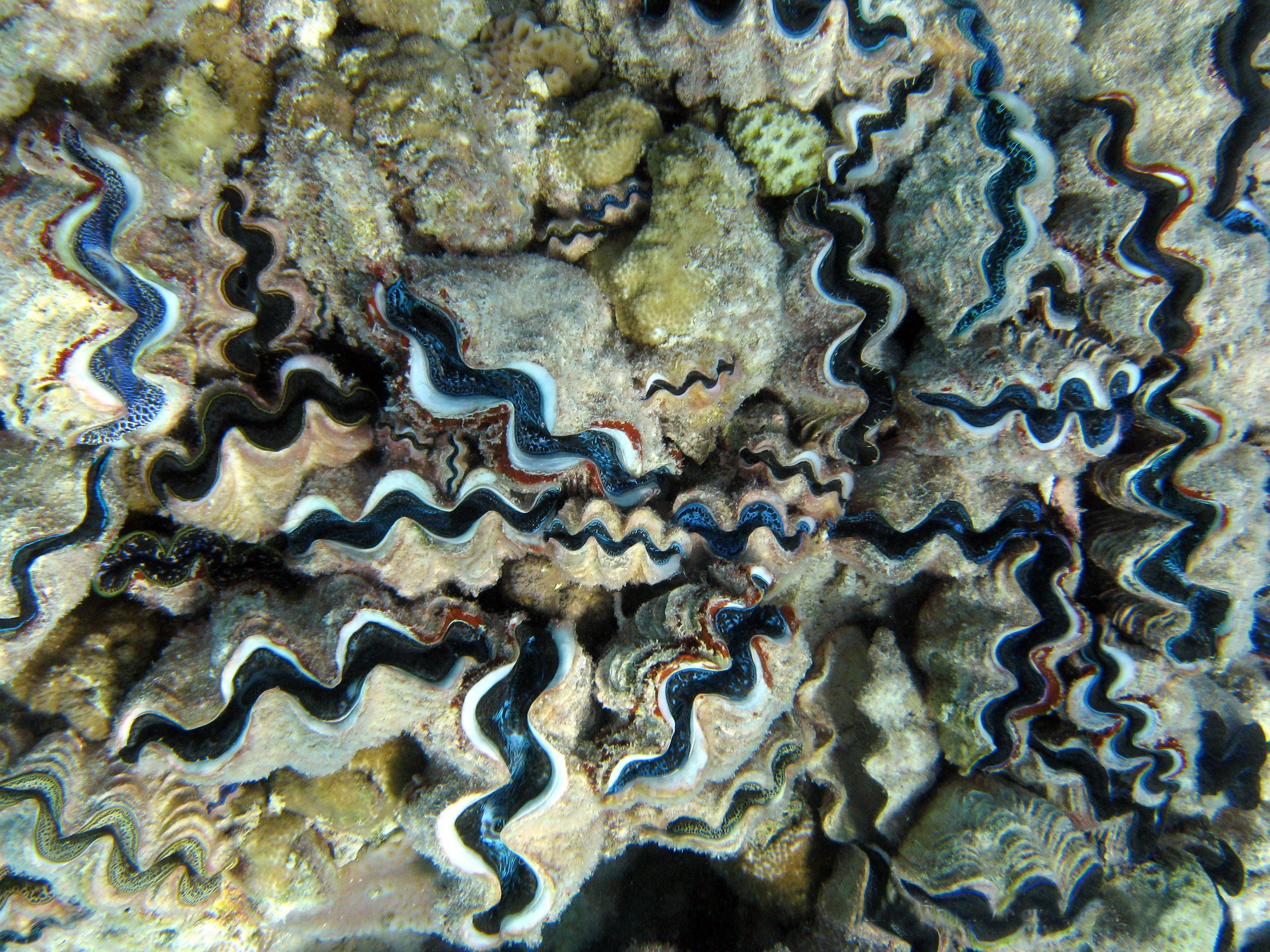
Tridacna giant clams in the lagoon of Orona

Unlike Manra, whose lagoon is too salty for marine life, Orona's lagoon teems with fish and giant clams.

The 2000 surveys (Obura, et al.) found that the extent of algae cover showed evidence of high nutrient levels by a high cover of filamentous wispy brown algae on all surfaces including rock, coral rubble, Halimeda and other algae. Live Coral Cover was extremely low at less than 5%, though coral heads typical of a healthy reef were abundant though dead, which suggested there was chronic mortality over an extended period of time. At inner leeward lagoon sites, coral species were identified typical of high-silt environments (e.g. Montipora efflorescens, Acropora lovelli), growing in fine calcareous silt in aggregated patches together with abundant giant clam (Tridacna). Towards the center and windward side of the lagoon the sandy bottom became coarser with coral growth developing around dead bommies and small patch reefs. Coral diversity increased progressively towards the lagoon channel, with increasing presence of outer-reef species. The most abundant coral species at Orona were: Goniastrea stelligera, Goniastrea edwardsi, Echinopora lamellosa, Leptastrea purpurea, Cyphastrea chalcidicum, Montipora efflorescens, Pavona varians and Pavona clavus.

== History ==
Like Manra, Orona contains evidence of prehistoric Polynesian inhabitation. An ancient stone marae stands on the eastern tip of the island, together with ruins of shelters, graves and other platforms.

No one is certain who discovered Orona or when, but history shows that it was named "Hull Island" in honor of Commodore Isaac Hull, USN by Commander Charles Wilkes of the USS Vincennes when he visited the island on 26 August 1840 in the United States Exploring Expedition. The expedition found 11 Tahitians and a Frenchman there catching turtles. It continued to be generally known by this name until the Republic of Kiribati was granted independence in 1979, when its name was changed to the I-Kiribati Orona.

Unlike Manra, Orona does not seem to have been worked for guano, and was apparently not claimed (unlike the other Phoenix Islands) by American guano diggers. The British flag was raised there on 11 July 1889, and the island became part of the Gilbert and Ellice Islands colony. Orona was leased in 1916 to a Captain Allen of the "Samoan Shipping and Trading Company", and became a copra plantation. Allen's lease was bought out by the British government in 1938.

It was one of the islands involved in the Phoenix Islands Settlement Scheme, the final colonial expansion of the British Empire. Residents were evacuated in 1963, due to persistent drought and the declining copra market. Photos of the abandoned settlement, Arariki, circa 1967, may be seen here. Hull Island Post Office opened on 1 January 1939 and closed around January 1964. After being abandoned, the island was reoccupied by American authorities in 1970 and administered from the Canton and Enderbury Islands Condominium. British and American claims to the island ended in 1979 with the independence of Kiribati from Great Britain and the signing of the Treaty of Tarawa in which the US retains the right to re-establish a military base. Administration was transferred to Kiribati authority in 1981.

The island was briefly reoccupied between 2001 and 2004 by trepangers from the Gilbert Islands supported by a patrol boat of the Kiribati Navy.

Orona, together with the other Phoenix Islands, was proclaimed in 2008 to be part of the Phoenix Islands Protected Area, the world's largest marine protected area.

== Photo gallery ==
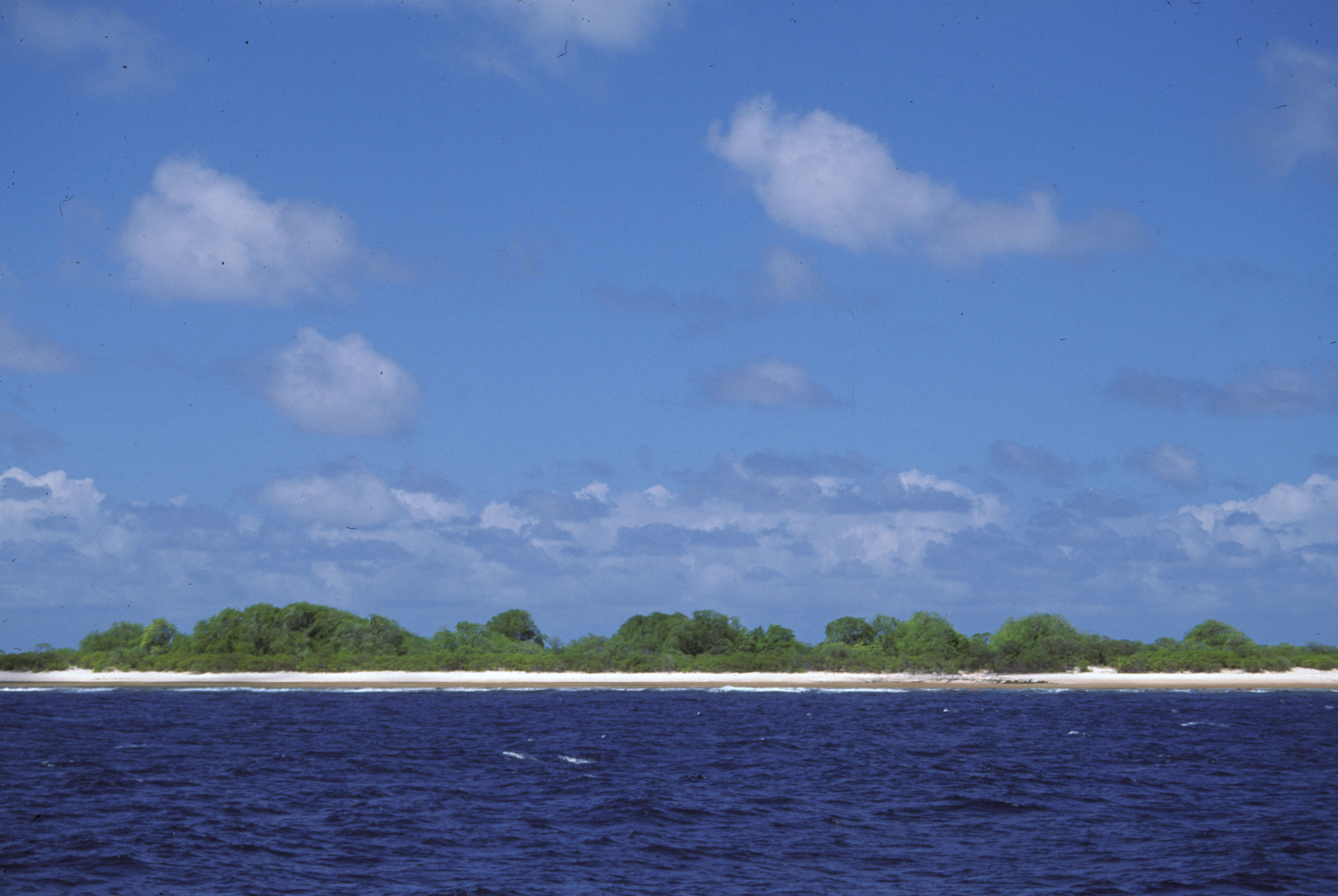
East end of Orona Island

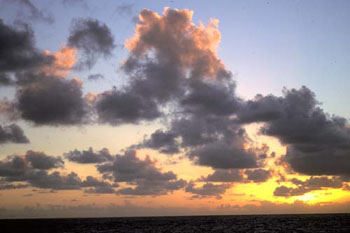
Orona Island sunset

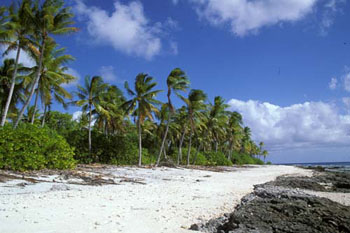
Beach near the landing on Orona Island

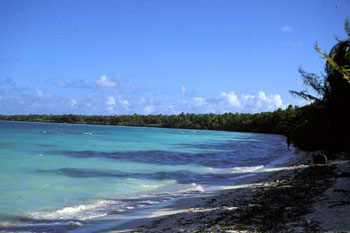
Lagoon shore on Orona Island

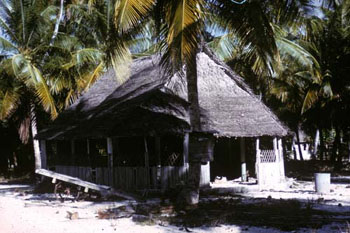
Remains of the Orona post office, from when Orona was inhabited

== See also ==
- List of Guano Island claims
- List of islands
- Desert island
