= Phoenix Islands Settlement Scheme =

British colonisation program in the Pacific

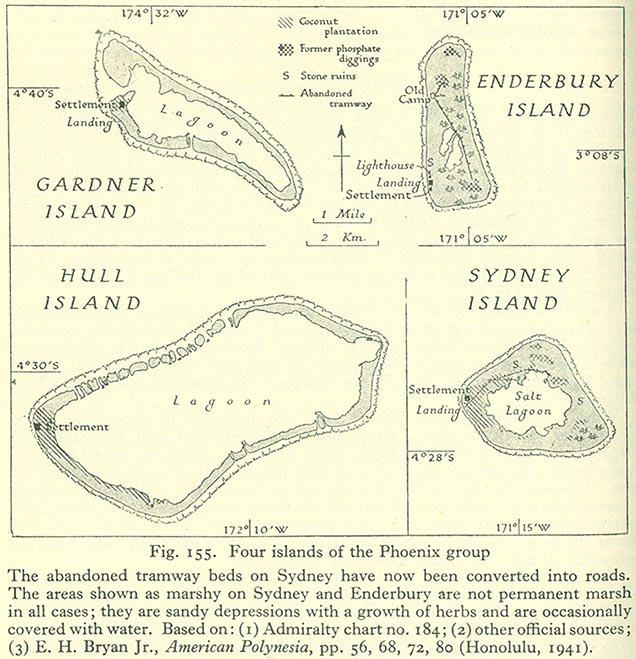
Islands of the Settlement Scheme and Enderbury Island

The Phoenix Islands Settlement Scheme was begun in 1938 in the western Pacific Ocean and was the last attempt at human colonisation within the British Empire.

== History ==
Conceived by Henry E. "Harry" Maude, lands commissioner of the Gilbert and Ellice Islands Colony, and approved by His Excellency Sir Harry Luke, Governor of Fiji and High Commissioner of the Western Pacific, the goal of the project was to reduce overpopulation in the southern Gilbert Islands by developing three mostly uninhabited atolls in the Phoenix Islands archipelago:

1. Nikumaroro (Gardner)
2. Manra (Sydney)
3. Orona (Hull)

A secondary goal was to enhance the British presence in the western Pacific in response to growing American influence through the Guano Islands Act, especially on Canton (later Kanton), where a commercial seaplane base was being established.

The three atolls, Sydney, Hull, and Gardner, were renamed in Gilbertese as Manra Island, Orona Atoll, and Nikumaroro respectively. Colonisation efforts by Gilbertese settlers were almost immediately hampered by the onset of the Second World War, the islands' isolation and the 1941 death on Nikumaroro of the project's officer in charge, 29-year-old civil servant Gerald Gallagher.

== Abandonment ==
After 1945 the three settlements continued to struggle with supply problems, limited markets for copra, the settlements' only major product, and drought, until the British government determined the colony could not be self-sustaining and evacuated the settlers in 1963, ending the project. The Phoenix Islands are part of Kiribati and in 2005 were officially uninhabited except for a few families on Kanton Island (census population 61 in 2000 and 41 in 2005).

== See also ==
- American Equatorial Islands Colonization Project
