= Manra =

Pacific island of Kiribati

Native name: Sydney Island
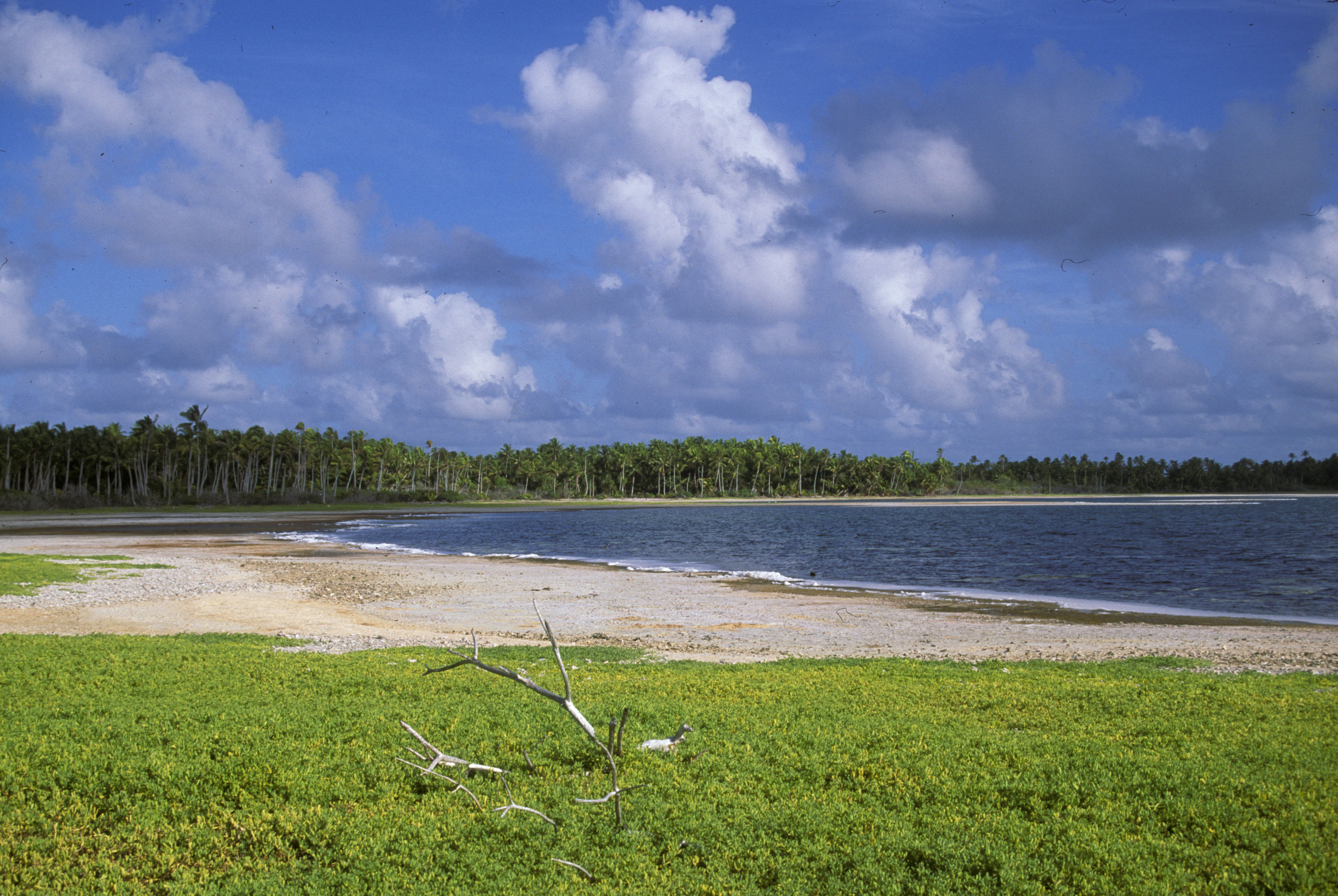
- Hypersaline lagoon on Manra Island

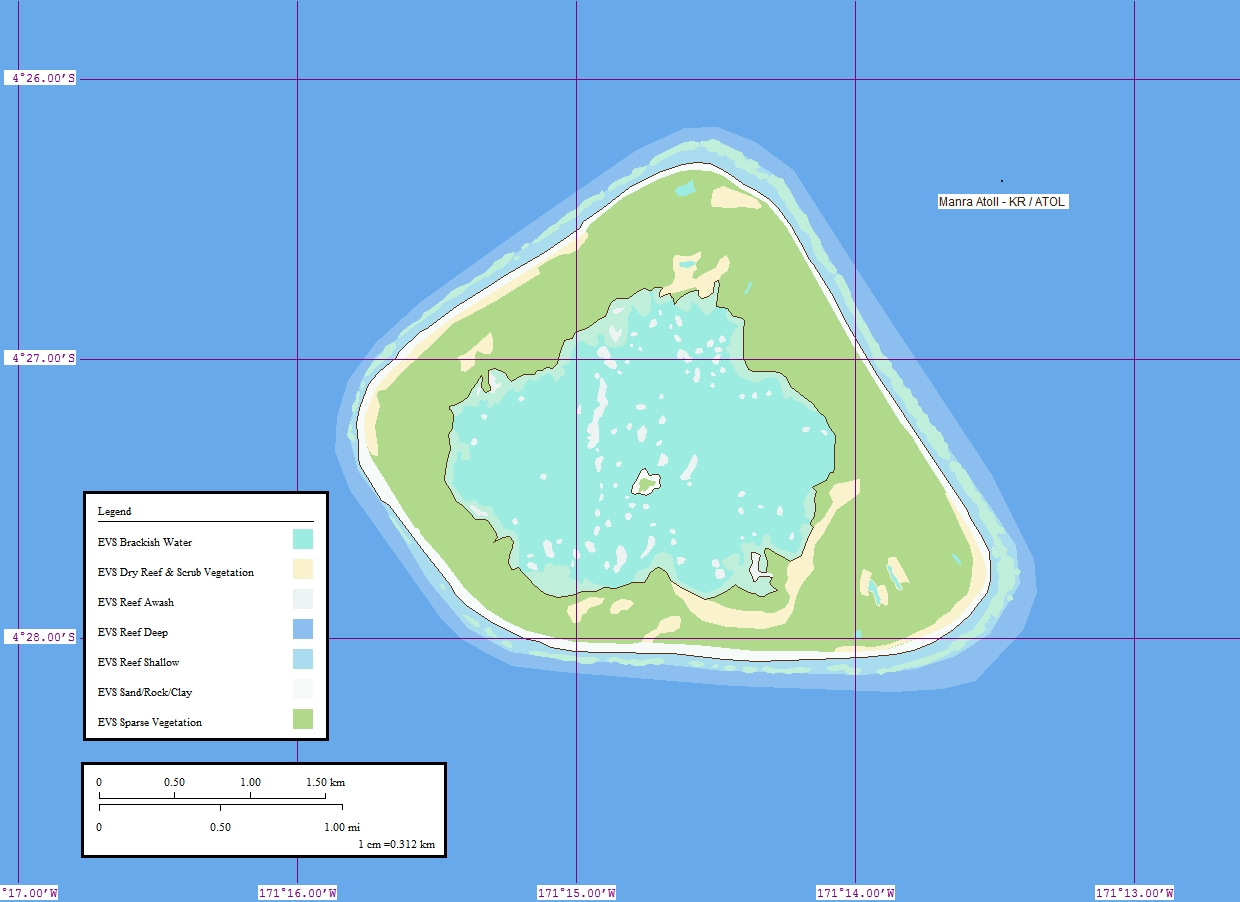
- Map of Manra Island

Geography
- Archipelago: Phoenix Islands
- Area: 4.4 km^{2} (1.7 sq mi)

Administration
- Kiribati

Demographics
- Population: 0

Manra (previously: Sydney Island), is one of the Phoenix Islands in the Republic of Kiribati. It lies at 4°27′S 171°16′W. longitude, and has an area of 4.4 km^{2} (1.7 sq mi). and an elevation of approximately six metres. Together with the seven other Phoenix Islands, it forms part of the Phoenix Islands Protected Area,. Charles Darwin visited the island during his five-year voyage (1831-1836), following which in 1842 he published an explanation for the creation of coral atolls in the South Pacific.

Though it has been occupied at various times in the past (including as late as 1963), Manra is currently uninhabited.

== Flora and fauna ==
=== Manra's flora and fauna ===
Manra is approximately triangular in shape, measuring approximately 3.2 by 2.8 km (2.0 by 1.7 mi). It completely surrounds a hyper-saline lagoon without outlet to the sea, containing depths of five to six metres (16 to 20 ft). The island is covered with coconut palms, scrub forest, herbs and grasses, including the species Tournefortia, Pisonia, Morinda, Cordia, Guettarda, and Scaevola. Manra was formerly a functioning copra plantation, though it is no longer.

Bird life is similar to the other Phoenix Islands, but has been described as "less abundant". Hermit crabs and rats are plentiful on the island, which also supports colonies of feral dogs, pigs and cats. According to E.H. Bryan, "insects are abundant, including a blue and white butterfly, several kinds of moths, dragonflies, ants, flies, leafhoppers, bugs, beetles, wasps, and spiders". Mosquitoes arrived in the late 19th century, on a ship from Tahiti.

=== Manra's reefs ===
The lagoon is too salty to support marine life, but fish are abundant around the fringing reef and offshore waters. H.E. Maude, in his 1937 report: Colonization of the Phoenix Islands, indicated that visitors to the island refused to eat any fish caught off the reef because of ciguatera poisoning. Bryan, on the other hand, insisted that the reef contains other fish species that made "excellent eating".

The 2000 surveys (Obura, et al.) identified that the coral communities at Manra were dominated by submassive and branching corals. The leeward site had a significant abundance of massive coral heads and the northern windward site had significant quantities of mushroom coral. The leeward sites showed typical coral communities for the Phoenix Islands with ≈ 30% Live Coral Cover and 20% coralline algae, followed by a mixture of fleshy algae, coral rubble and sand. The most abundant coral species at Manra were: Cyphastrea chalcidicum, Echinopora lamellosa, Goniastrea stelligera, Herpolitha limax, Favites pentagona, Fungia danai, Fungia fungites and Fungia scutaria.

== History ==
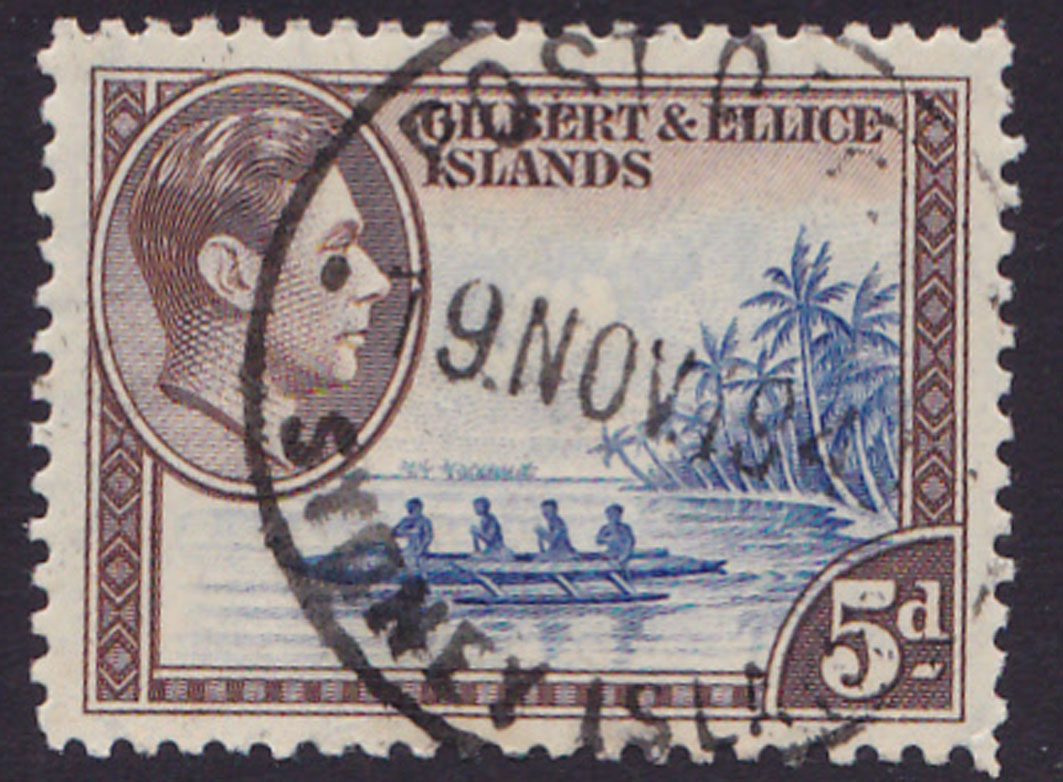
Sydney Island postmark ca 1945

Unlike some of the other Phoenix Islands, Manra contains definite evidence of prehistoric habitation, in the form of at least a dozen platforms and remains of enclosures in the northeast and northwest portions of the island. K.P. Emory, ethnologist at Honolulu's Bishop Museum, estimated that two groups of people were present there, one from eastern Polynesia, the other from Micronesia. Wells and pits from these early inhabitants were also found.

Manra was discovered in 1823 from the London whaling ship Sydney Packet, T. Emmett Master, and was called Sydney. It is the birthplace of Sydney Aris (1884–1966) née Arundel, daughter of Lillie Arundel and John T. Arundel. At that time John T. Arundel & Co. was then engaged in mining guano on the island. Manra was turned into a Burns, Philp & Co coconut plantation in the early 20th century. Later, in 1938, it became one of the islands involved in the Phoenix Islands Settlement Scheme, the final colonial expansion of the British Empire. Approximately 130 settlers were imported, and a village constructed complete with radio shack, cement cistern and 15 water wells. Each adult settler was given fifty coconut palms, and each child granted two unplanted sections, 150 feet (80 m) square. Ultimately, the colony failed, due to prolonged drought and the declining world market for copra.

Sydney Island Post Office opened on 11 January 1939 and closed in 1958.

Manra was depopulated between 1958 and 1963 and has remained uninhabited since.

The island was declared a bird sanctuary in 1938, and a wildlife sanctuary in 1975. Kiribati declared the Phoenix Islands Protected Area in 2006, with the park being expanded in 2008. The 164,200-square-mile (425,300-square-kilometre) marine reserve contains eight coral atolls including Manra.

== Photo gallery ==
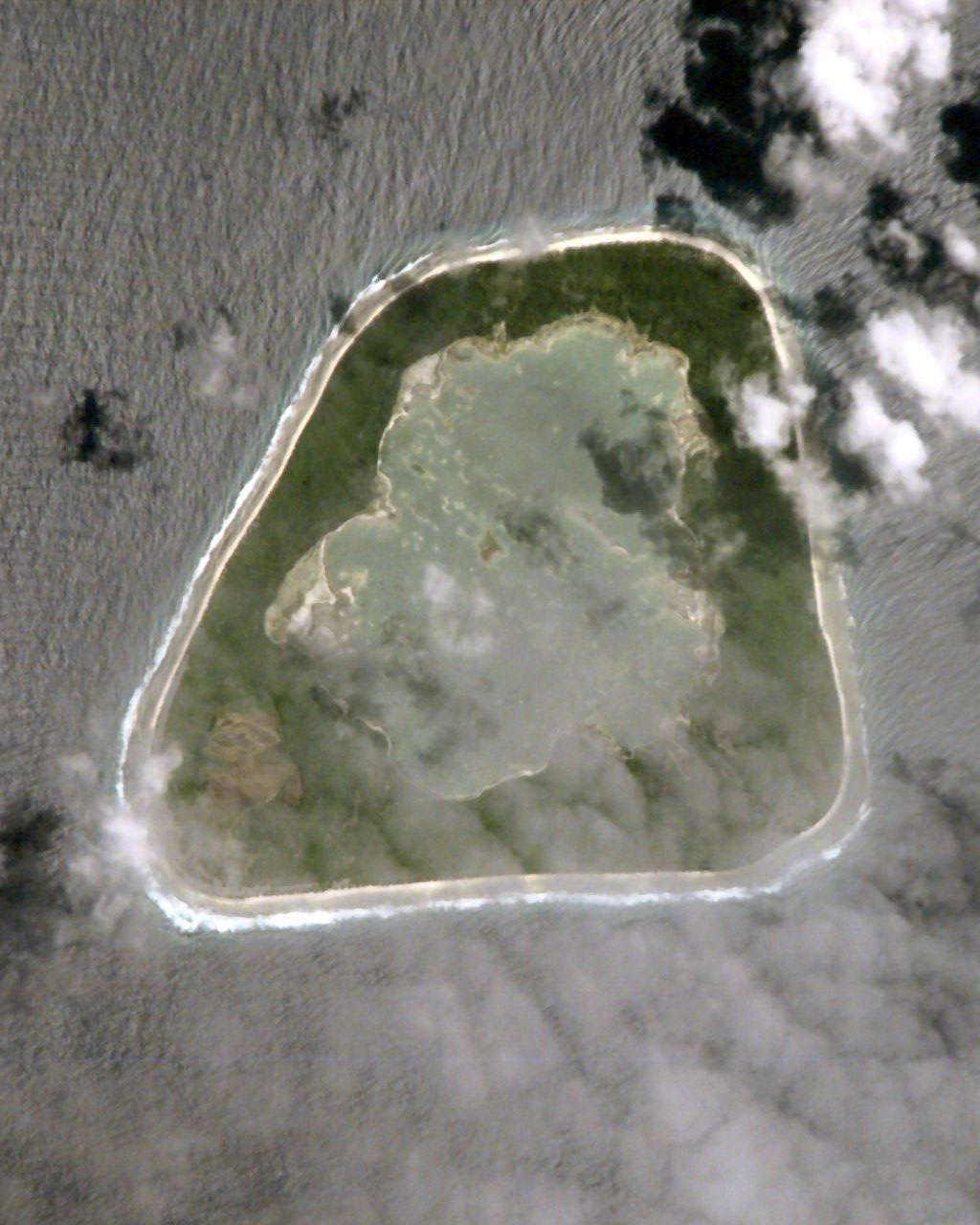
NASA astronaut image of Manra

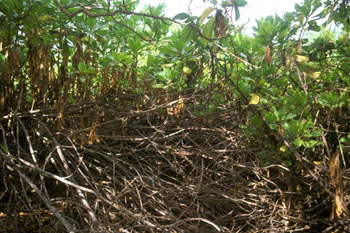
Scaevola thicket on Manra Island

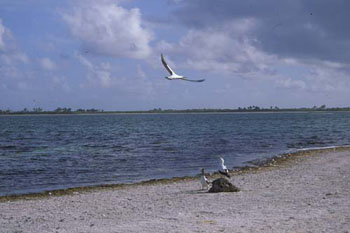
Lagoon shore on Manra Island

== See also ==
- Desert island
- List of islands

== Sources ==
- Maude, Henry Evans: Of islands and men : studies in Pacific history; Melbourne: Oxford University Press, 1968
- Jones, A. G. E.: Ships employed in the South Seas trade Vol. 1: 1775 - 1861; Canberra 1986 & Vol. 2: 1775 - 1859; Burwood, Vic. [1992]
