= Island commander =

Position in the United States

An Island Commander is an official who is put in charge of an island, or an insular entity called after an island or an archipelago called Islands.

The United States have used the title for several of their overseas insular possessions, considered too small to have a higher official such as a (Lieutenant) Governor :

Presently
Wake Island since July 4, 1898 till present

Formerly
Two of the three islands that previously had been under the two consecutive heads of the American Equatorial Islands Colonization Project, 1935 – February 7, 1942 (Jarvis Island only had an international Station Chief afterwards):

Baker Island: September 1943 – May 1944 (incumbents unknown); September 1943 – May 1944 while occupied by U.S. military forces (Baker Naval Air Station). Since June 27, 1974 it is administered by the U.S. Fish & Wildlife Service as Baker Island National Wildlife Refuge.
Johnston Atoll: 1934–2003; on January 1, 2004, the island was turned over to the U.S. Fish and Wildlife Service as Johnston Atoll Wildlife Refuge

Midway Islands June 1940 – October 31, 1996; since administered by the U.S. Fish & Wildlife Service as Midway Island National Wildlife Refuge
Palmyra Atoll November 1939 – 1947 while occupied by U.S. military forces. Since August 15, 1941 it harbored the Palmyra U.S. Naval Air Station, now Palmyra (Cooper) Airport.
