= Howland Island =

US-controlled coral island in the central Pacific Ocean

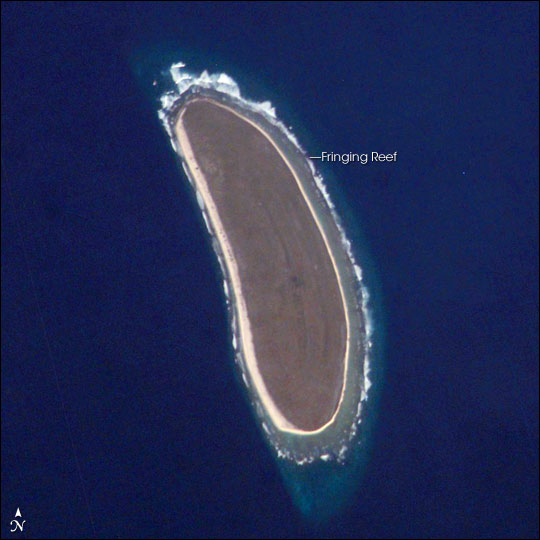
- Location of Howland Island in the Pacific Ocean

- Location within Oceania

Geography
- Location: North Pacific Ocean
- Coordinates: 0°48′25.84″N 176°36′59.48″W
- Archipelago: Phoenix Islands
- Area: 2.6 km^{2} (1.0 sq mi)
- Length: 2.25 km (1.398 mi)
- Width: 0.89 km (0.553 mi)
- Coastline: 6.4 km (3.98 mi)
- Highest elevation: 3 m (10 ft)

Administration
- United States
- Status: Unincorporated, unorganized territory (United States Minor Outlying Islands)

Demographics
- Population: 0 (2000)

Additional information
- Time zone: International Date Line West (UTC−12:00)
- Howland Island National Wildlife Refuge
- IUCN category Ia (strict nature reserve)
- Designated: 1974
- Website: www.fws.gov/refuge/howland-island

Howland Island (/ˈhaʊlənd/) is an uninhabited coral island and strict nature reserve located just north of the equator in the central Pacific Ocean, about 1,700 nautical miles (3,100 km) southwest of Honolulu. The island lies almost halfway between Hawaii and Australia and is an unincorporated, unorganized territory of the United States. Together with Baker Island, it forms part of the Phoenix Islands. For statistical purposes, Howland is grouped as one of the United States Minor Outlying Islands. The island has an elongated cucumber-shape on a north–south axis, 1.40 by 0.55 miles (2.25 km × 0.89 km), and covers 1 square mile (640 acres; 2.6 km^{2}).

Howland Island National Wildlife Refuge consists of the entire island and the surrounding 32,074 acres (129.80 km^{2}) of submerged land. The island is managed by the U.S. Fish and Wildlife Service as an insular area under the U.S. Department of the Interior. It is part of the Pacific Islands Heritage Marine National Monument.

The atoll currently has no economic activity. It is managed as a nature reserve. It is best known as the island Amelia Earhart and Fred Noonan were striving for but failed to reach when they and their airplane disappeared on July 2, 1937, during their planned round-the-world flight. Airstrips constructed to accommodate their planned stopover were subsequently damaged in World War II, not maintained, and gradually disappeared. There are no harbors or docks. The fringing reefs may pose a maritime hazard. There is a boat landing area along the middle of the sandy beach on the west coast and a crumbling day beacon. The island is visited every two years by the U.S. Fish and Wildlife Service. It was mined for guano in the 19th century, and in the 1930s it was colonized by the American Equatorial Islands Colonization Project. In modern times, it is a nature reserve, and there are some historical remains from the colony and a stone tower called Earhart Light.

== Flora and fauna ==
The climate is equatorial, characterised by intense sunshine and low rainfall, with temperatures moderated by easterly trade winds. The terrain is low-lying and sandy, consisting of a coral island surrounded by a narrow fringing reef with a slightly raised central area. The highest point is approximately 20 feet (6.1 m) above sea level.

There are no natural fresh water resources. The landscape features scattered grasses along with prostrate vines and low-growing pisonia trees and shrubs. A 1942 eyewitness description spoke of "a low grove of dead and decaying kou trees" on a very shallow hill at the island's center. In 2000, a visitor accompanying a scientific expedition reported seeing "a flat bulldozed plain of coral sand, without a single tree" and some traces of buildings from colonization or World War II building efforts, all wood and stone ruins overgrown by vegetation.

Howland is primarily a nesting, roosting, and foraging habitat for seabirds, shorebirds, and marine wildlife. The island, with its surrounding marine waters, has been recognized as an Important Bird Area (IBA) by BirdLife International because it supports seabird colonies of lesser frigatebirds, masked boobies, red-tailed tropicbirds and sooty terns, as well as serving as a migratory stopover for bristle-thighed curlews.

== Economics ==
Map of Howland Island

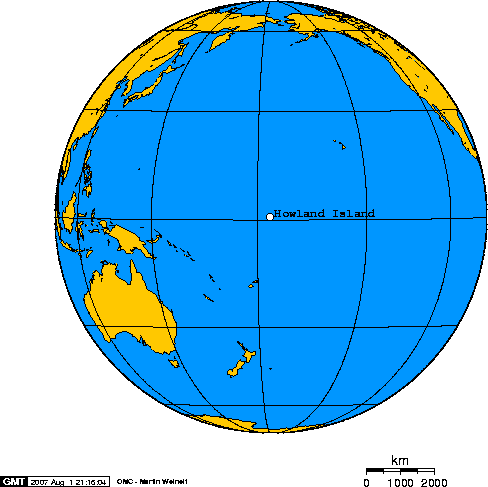
Orthographic projection centered over Howland Island

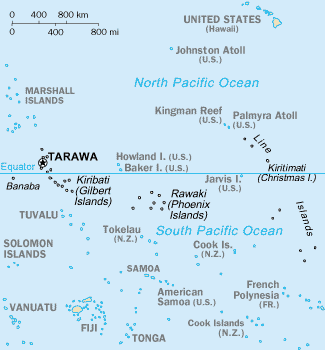
Map of the central Pacific Ocean showing Howland Island and nearby Baker Island just north of the Equator and east of Tarawa

The U.S. claims an Exclusive Economic Zone of 200 nautical miles (370 km) and a territorial sea of 12 nautical miles (22 km) around the island.

== Time zone ==
Since Howland Island is uninhabited, no time zone is specified. It lies within a nautical time zone, which is 12 hours behind UTC, named International Date Line West (IDLW). Howland Island and Baker Island are the only places on Earth observing this time zone. This time zone is also called AoE, Anywhere on Earth, a calendar designation indicating that a period expires when the date passes everywhere on Earth.

== History ==
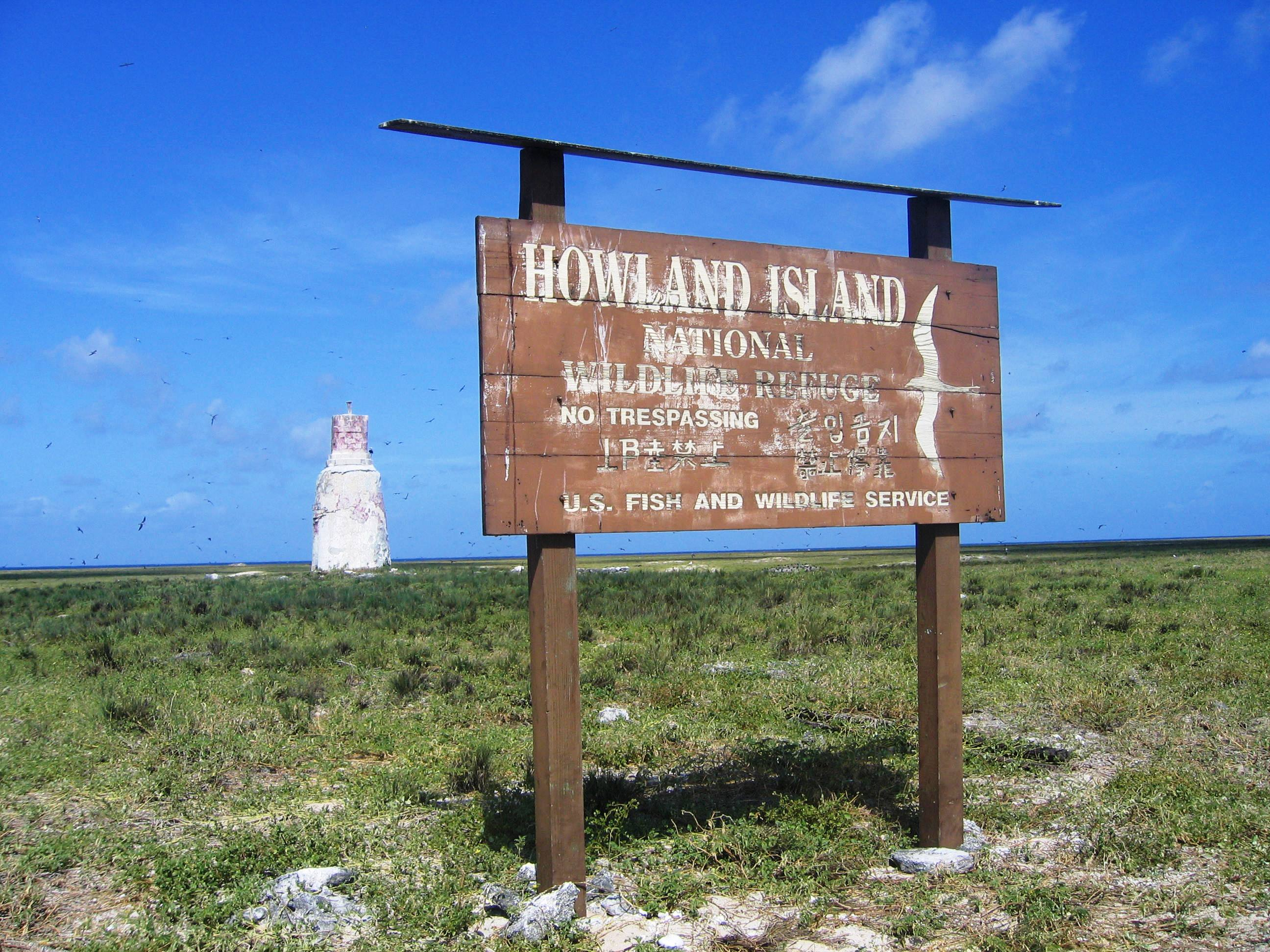
Howland Island sign, and in the background, the repaired Day Beacon tower

Howland Island was claimed by the United States in 1857 under the 1856 Guano Islands Act and was mined for guano later that century. In the 1930s, economic activity on the island began with a few people, several buildings, a day beacon, and a cleared landing strip. This was the island Amelia Earhart and Fred Noonan were going to land on when they were not heard from again on their long flight. The day after Pearl Harbor, the island was bombed and attacked several more times, which damaged the day beacon and killed two people, finally leading to the island's evacuation. After the war, the day beacon was repaired, and the island became a nature reserve. It has been the subject of visits to honor or look for the lost aviator, Earhart.

=== Prehistoric settlement ===
Sparse remnants of trails and other surface features indicate a possible early Polynesian presence, including excavations and mounds, stacked rocks, and a footpath made of long, flat stones. In the 1860s, James Duncan Hague noted discovering the remains of a hut, canoe fragments, a blue bead, and a human skeleton buried in the sand. However, the perishable nature of the wooden materials and the lack of beadwork in Polynesia suggests these materials are historical. The presence of the kou tree (Cordia subcordata) and Polynesian rats (Rattus exulans) on the island is also considered a possible indicator of early Polynesian visits to Howland.

However, the only modern archaeological survey of Howland, conducted by the US Army Corps of Engineers in 1987, found no evidence of prehistoric settlement or use of the island. Still, sub-surface testing was limited in scope due to time constraints. Additionally, the USACE survey failed to locate the architectural features described by Hague. However, they concede this may be due to the destruction of these features later during the construction of an airstrip. A later conservation plan by the US Fish and Wildlife Service suggests that Howland was likely used as a stopover or meeting point as opposed to being permanently occupied.

=== Sightings by whalers ===
Captain George B. Worth of the Nantucket whaler Oeno sighted Howland around 1822 and called it Worth Island. Daniel MacKenzie of the American whaler Minerva Smith was unaware of Worth's sighting when he charted the island in 1828 and named it after his ship's owners on December 1, 1828. Howland Island was at last named on September 9, 1842 after a lookout who sighted it from the whaleship Isabella under Captain Geo. E. Netcher of New Bedford.

Captain William Bligh of HMS Bounty, in his diary after the mutiny, described stopping at the island shortly after being set adrift by the mutineers in April 1789. He had 18 crew members who scoured the island for sustenance, such as oysters, water, and birds. Bligh was unsure of the island's name, but apparently, it was known to cartographers. Bligh's account on Howland Island is open to question since his route in the boat began between Tonga and Tofua and ran more or less west directly to Timor.

=== U.S. possession and guano mining ===
Howland Island was uninhabited when the United States took possession of it under the Guano Islands Act of 1856. The island was a known navigation hazard for decades, and several ships were wrecked there. Its guano deposits were mined by American companies from about 1857 until October 1878, although there was a dispute between mining companies.

Captain Geo. E. Netcher of the Isabella informed Captain Taylor of its discovery. As Taylor had discovered another guano island in the Indian Ocean, they agreed to share the benefits of the guano on the two islands. Taylor put Netcher in communication with Alfred G. Benson, president of the American Guano Company, which was incorporated in 1857. Other entrepreneurs were approached as George and Matthew Howland, who later became United States Guano Company members, engaged Mr. Stetson to visit the island on the ship Rousseau under Captain Pope. Mr. Stetson arrived on the island in 1854 and described it as being occupied by birds and a plague of rats.

The American Guano Company established claims with respect to Baker Island and Jarvis Island, which were recognized under the U.S. Guano Islands Act of 1856. Benson tried to interest the American Guano Company in the Howland Island deposits; however, the company directors considered they already had sufficient deposits. In October 1857, the American Guano Company sent Benson's son Arthur to Baker and Jarvis Islands to survey the guano deposits. He also visited Howland Island and took samples of the guano. Subsequently, Alfred G. Benson resigned from the American Guano Company. Netcher, Taylor, and George W. Benson formed the United States Guano Company to exploit the guano on Howland Island, with this claim recognized under the U.S. Guano Islands Act of 1856.

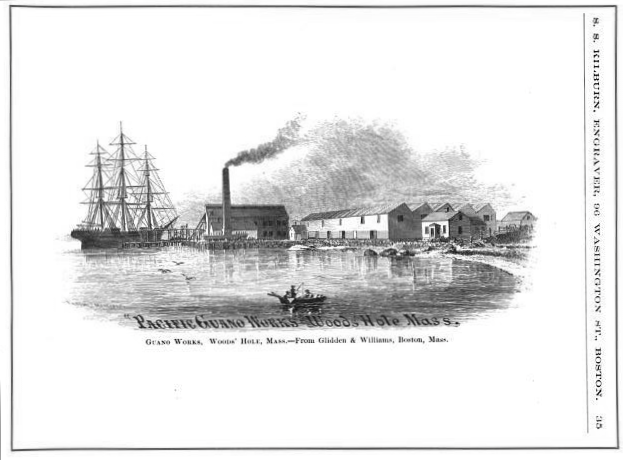
Pacific Guano Company

However, when the United States Guano Company dispatched a vessel in 1859 to mine the guano, they found that Howland Island was already occupied by men sent there by the American Guano Company. The companies ended up in New York state court, (Note: American Guano Co. v. U.S. Guano Co., 44 Barb. 23 (N.Y. 1865).) with the American Guano Company arguing that the United States Guano Company had, in effect, abandoned the island since the continual possession and actual occupation required for ownership by the Guano Islands Act did not occur. The result was that both companies were allowed to mine the guano deposits, which were substantially depleted by October 1878. Laborers for the mining operations came from around the Pacific, including from Hawaiʻi; the Hawaiian laborers named Howland Island Ulukou ('kou tree grove'). Established in 1861, the Pacific Guano Company purchased Howland Island to provide a source of guano for its fertilizer plant.

In the late 19th century, British claims were made on the island, and attempts were made to set up mining. John T. Arundel and Company, a British firm using laborers from the Cook Islands and Niue, occupied the island from 1886 to 1891.

Executive Order 7368 was issued on May 13, 1936 to clarify American sovereignty.

=== Itascatown (1935–1942) ===
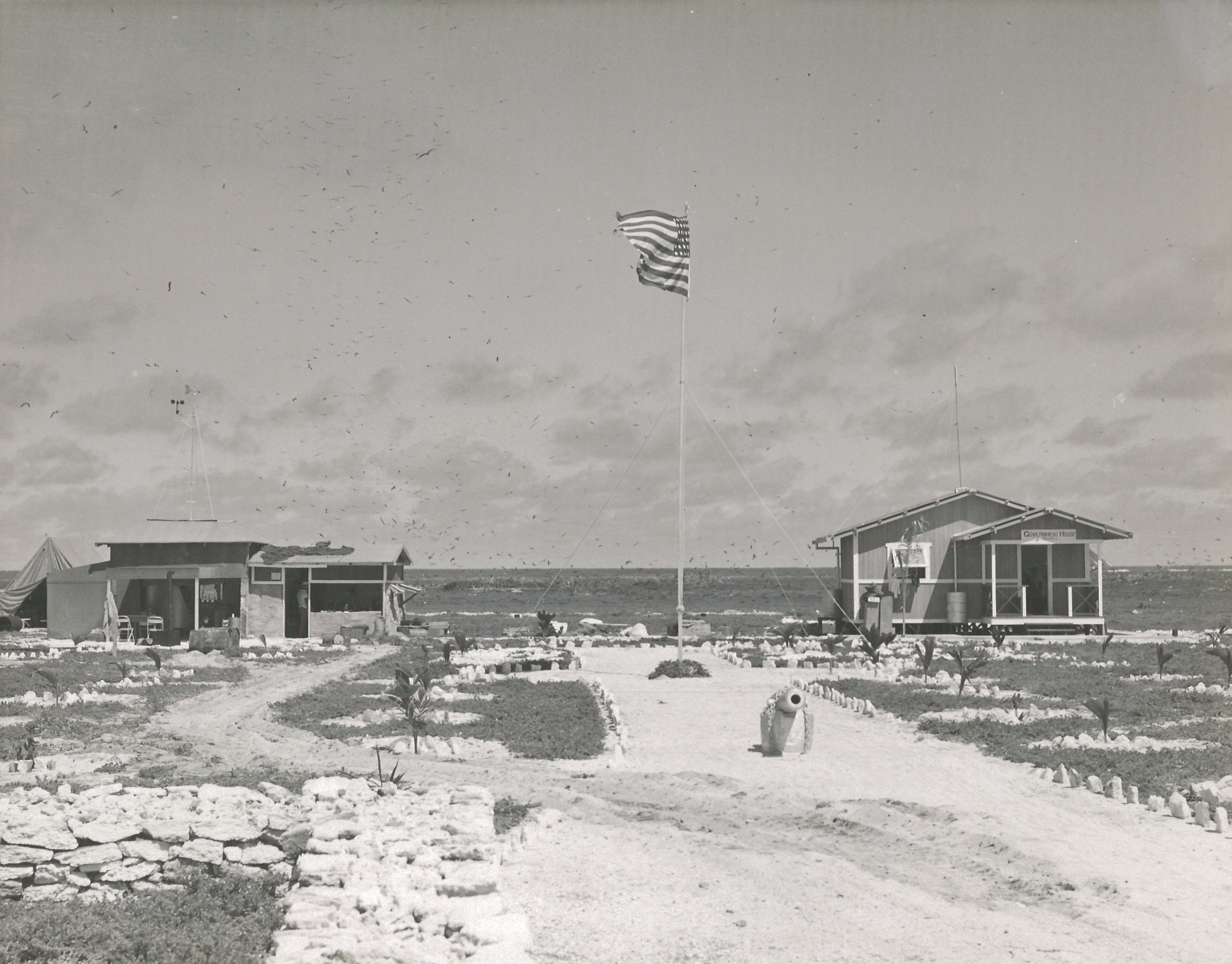
View of the settlement on the island, 1937

In 1935, colonists from the American Equatorial Islands Colonization Project arrived on the island to establish a permanent U.S. presence in the Central Pacific. It began with a rotating group of four alumni and students from the Kamehameha School for Boys, a private school in Honolulu. Although the recruits had signed on as part of a scientific expedition and expected to spend their three-month assignment collecting botanical and biological samples, once out to sea, they were told, according to one of the Jarvis Island colonists, George West, "Your names will go down in history" and that the islands would become "famous air bases in a route that will connect Australia with California".

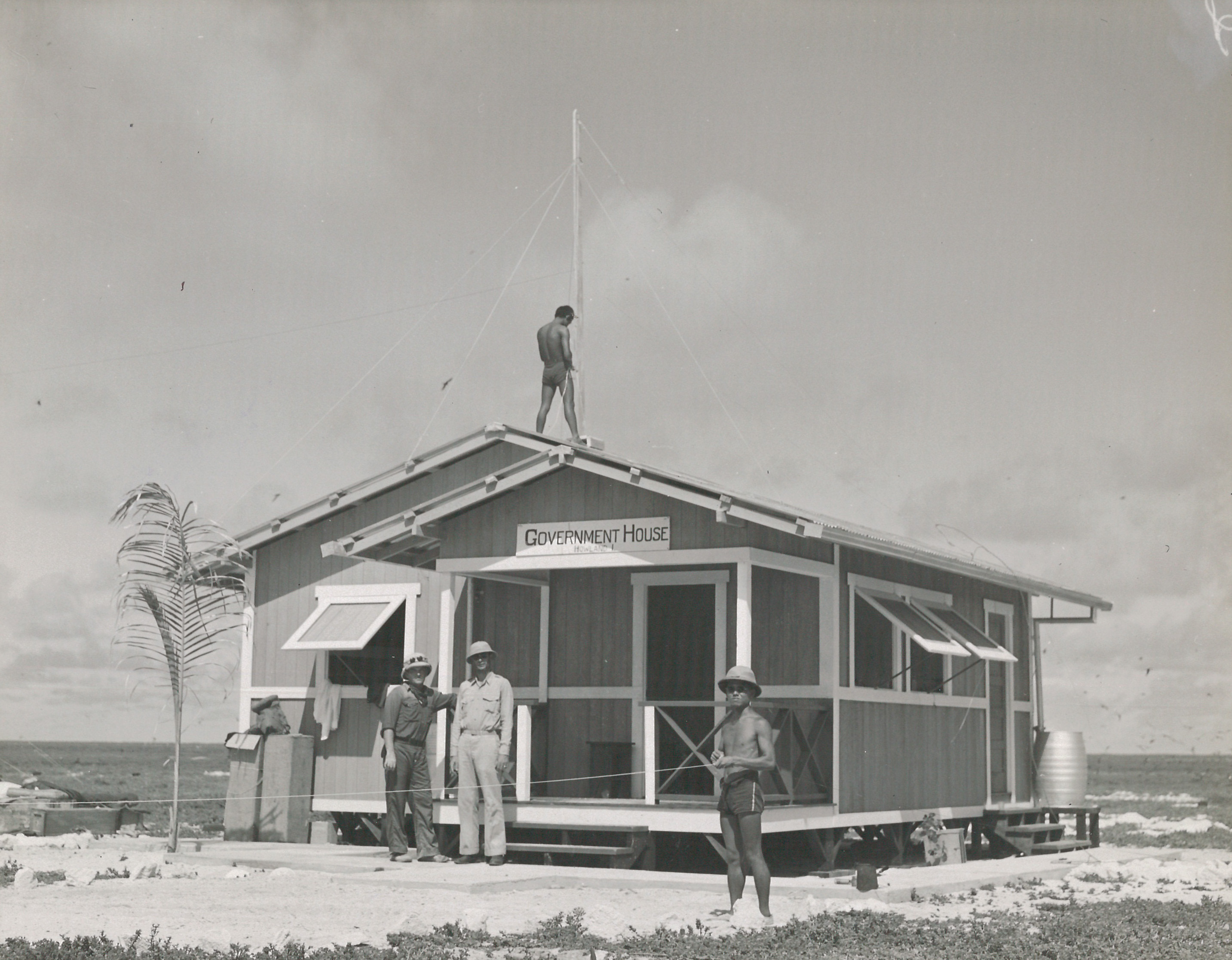
Government House, 1937

The settlement was named Itascatown after the USCGC Itasca that brought the colonists to Howland and made regular cruises between the other equatorial islands during that era. Itascatown was a line of a half-dozen small wood-framed structures and tents near the beach on the island's western side. The fledgling colonists were given large stocks of canned food, water, and other supplies, including a gasoline-powered refrigerator, radio equipment, medical kits, and (characteristic of that era) vast quantities of cigarettes. Fishing provided variety in their diet. Most of the colonists' endeavors involved making hourly weather observations and constructing rudimentary infrastructure on the island, including clearing a landing strip for airplanes. During this period, the island was on Hawaii time, which was then 10.5 hours behind UTC. (Note: Quote: Thursday, July 1, 1937... Howland Island was using the 10+30 hour time zone — the same as Hawaii standard time...") Similar colonization projects were started on nearby Baker Island and Jarvis Island, as well as Canton Island and Enderbury in the Phoenix Islands, which later became part of Kiribati. According to the 1940 U.S. census, Howland Island had a population of four people on April 1, 1940.

=== Kamakaiwi Field ===
The planned flight route of Amelia Earhart across the Pacific

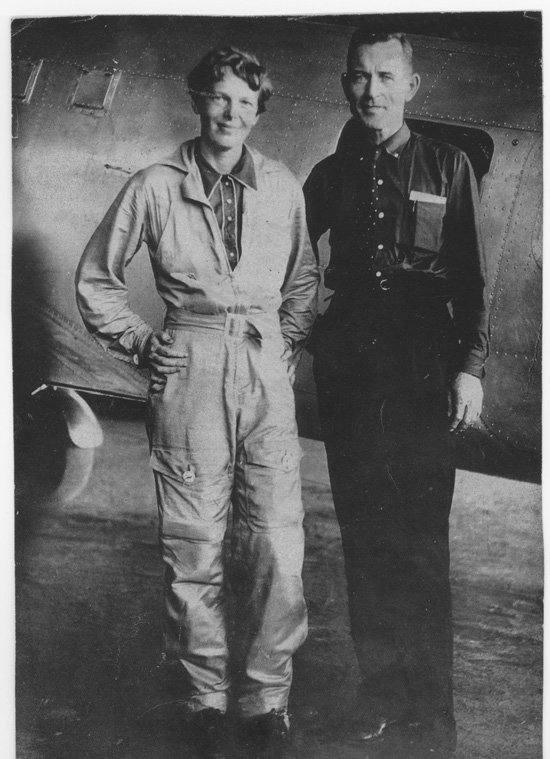
Amelia Earhart and Fred Noonan

Ground was cleared for a rudimentary aircraft landing area during the mid-1930s in anticipation that the island might eventually become a stopover for commercial trans-Pacific air routes and also to further U.S. territorial claims in the region against rival claims from Great Britain. Howland Island was designated as a scheduled refueling stop for American pilot Amelia Earhart and navigator Fred Noonan on their round-the-world flight in 1937. Works Progress Administration (WPA) funds were used by the Bureau of Air Commerce to construct three graded, unpaved runways meant to accommodate Earhart's twin-engined Lockheed Model 10 Electra.

The facility was named Kamakaiwi Field after James Kamakaiwi, a young Hawaiian who arrived with the first group of four colonists. He was selected as the group's leader and spent more than three years on Howland, far longer than the average recruit. It has also been referred to as WPA Howland Airport (the WPA contributed about 20 percent of the $12,000 cost).

Earhart and Noonan took off from Lae, New Guinea, and their radio transmissions were picked up near the island when their aircraft reached the vicinity, but they failed to arrive. It is known that they must have gotten within the radio range of Howland due to the strength of the final radio communications that morning, despite some problems with radio communication and radio direction finding. In some of the last messages recorded from them on 2 July 1937, 7:42 am, Earhart reported, "We must be on you, but cannot see you – but gas is running low. Have been unable to reach you by radio. We are flying at 1,000 feet." (Note: At an altitude of 1,000 feet, the plane would be able to see about 38 miles in clear weather.) At 8:43 am, Earhart reported, "We are on the line 157 337. We will repeat this message. We will repeat this on 6210 kilocycles. Wait." Between Earhart's low-on-fuel message at 7:42 am and her last confirmed message at 8:43, her signal strength remained consistent, indicating that she never left the immediate Howland area as she ran low on fuel. The U.S. Coast Guard determined this by tracking her signal strength as she approached the island, noting signal levels from her reports of 200 and 100 miles out. These reports were roughly 30 minutes apart, providing vital ground-speed clues.

After the largest search and rescue attempt in history up to that time, the U.S. Navy concluded that the Electra had run out of fuel, and Earhart and Noonan ditched at sea and perished. Based on the strength of the transmission signals from Earhart, the Coast Guard concluded that the plane ran out of fuel north of Howland. Many later studies came to the same conclusion; however, an alternative hypothesis that Earhart and Noonan may have landed the plane on Gardner Island (now called Nikumaroro) and died as castaways has been considered.

=== Japanese attacks during World War II ===
A Japanese air attack on December 8, 1941, by 14 twin-engined Mitsubishi G3M "Nell" bombers of Chitose Kōkūtai, from Kwajalein islands, killed colonists Richard "Dicky" Kanani Whaley and Joseph Kealoha Keliʻihananui. The raid came one day after the Japanese attack on Pearl Harbor. It damaged the three airstrips of Kamakaiwi Field. Two days later, shelling from a Japanese submarine destroyed what was left of the colony's buildings. A single bomber returned twice during the following weeks and dropped more bombs on the rubble. The two survivors were finally evacuated by the USS Helm, a U.S. Navy destroyer, on January 31, 1942. Thomas Bederman, one of the two survivors, later recounted his experience during the incident in a March 9, 1942 edition of Life. Howland was occupied by a battalion of the United States Marine Corps in September 1943 and was known as Howland Naval Air Station until May 1944.

All attempts at habitation were abandoned after 1944. Colonization projects on the other four islands, also disrupted by the war, were abandoned. No aircraft is known to have landed on the island, though anchorages nearby were used by float planes and flying boats during World War II. For example, on July 10, 1944, a U.S. Navy Martin PBM-3-D Mariner flying boat (BuNo 48199), piloted by William Hines, had an engine fire and made a forced landing in the ocean off Howland. Hines beached the aircraft, and though it burned, the crew were unharmed, rescued by the USCGC Balsam, transferred to a subchaser, and taken to Canton Island.

== National Wildlife Refuge ==
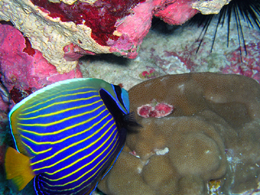
Emperor Angelfish and hump coral – Howland Island NWR.

On June 27, 1974, Secretary of the Interior Rogers Morton created Howland Island National Wildlife Refuge, which was expanded in 2009 to add submerged lands within 12 nautical miles (22 km) of the island. The refuge now includes 648 acres (2.62 km^{2}) of land and 410,351 acres (1,660.63 km^{2}) of water. Along with six other islands, the island was administered by the U.S. Fish and Wildlife Service as part of the Pacific Remote Islands National Wildlife Refuge Complex. In January 2009, that entity was upgraded to the Pacific Remote Islands Marine National Monument by President George W. Bush.

Multiple invasive exotic species have affected the island habitat. Black rats were introduced in 1854 and eradicated in 1938 by feral cats introduced the year before. The cats proved destructive to bird species and were eliminated by 1985. Pacific crabgrass continues to compete with local plants.

Public entry to the island is allowed with a special use permit from the U.S. Fish and Wildlife Service, and it is generally restricted to scientists and educators. Representatives from the agency visit the island on average once every two years, often coordinating transportation with amateur radio operators or the U.S. Coast Guard to defray the high cost of logistical support.

== Earhart Light ==
Earhart Light
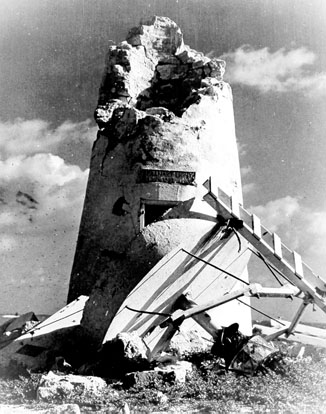
- Howland Island Light
- Location: Howland Island, Phoenix Islands, Howland Island, United States
- Coordinates: 0°48′20″N 176°37′09″W
- Constructed: 1937
- Built by
- Construction: rubble
- Height: 6 m (20 ft)
- Shape: cylindrical tower, no lantern
- Markings: white and black horizontal bands (originally)

Light
- Deactivated: 1942

Colonists sent to the island in the mid-1930s to establish possession by the United States, built the Earhart Light (0°48′20.48″N 176°37′8.55″W), named after Amelia Earhart, as a day beacon or navigational landmark. It is shaped like a short lighthouse. It was constructed of white sandstone with painted black bands and a black top meant to be visible several miles out to sea during daylight hours. It is located near the boat landing in the middle of the west coast, near Itascatown. The beacon was partially destroyed early in World War II by Japanese attacks but was rebuilt in the early 1960s by men from the U.S. Coast Guard ship Blackhaw. By 2000, the beacon was reported to be crumbling, and it had not been repainted in decades.

Ann Pellegreno overflew the island in 1967, and Linda Finch did so in 1997 during memorial circumnavigation flights to commemorate Earhart's 1937 world flight. No landings were attempted, but Pellegreno and Finch flew low enough to drop a wreath on the island.

== Image gallery ==
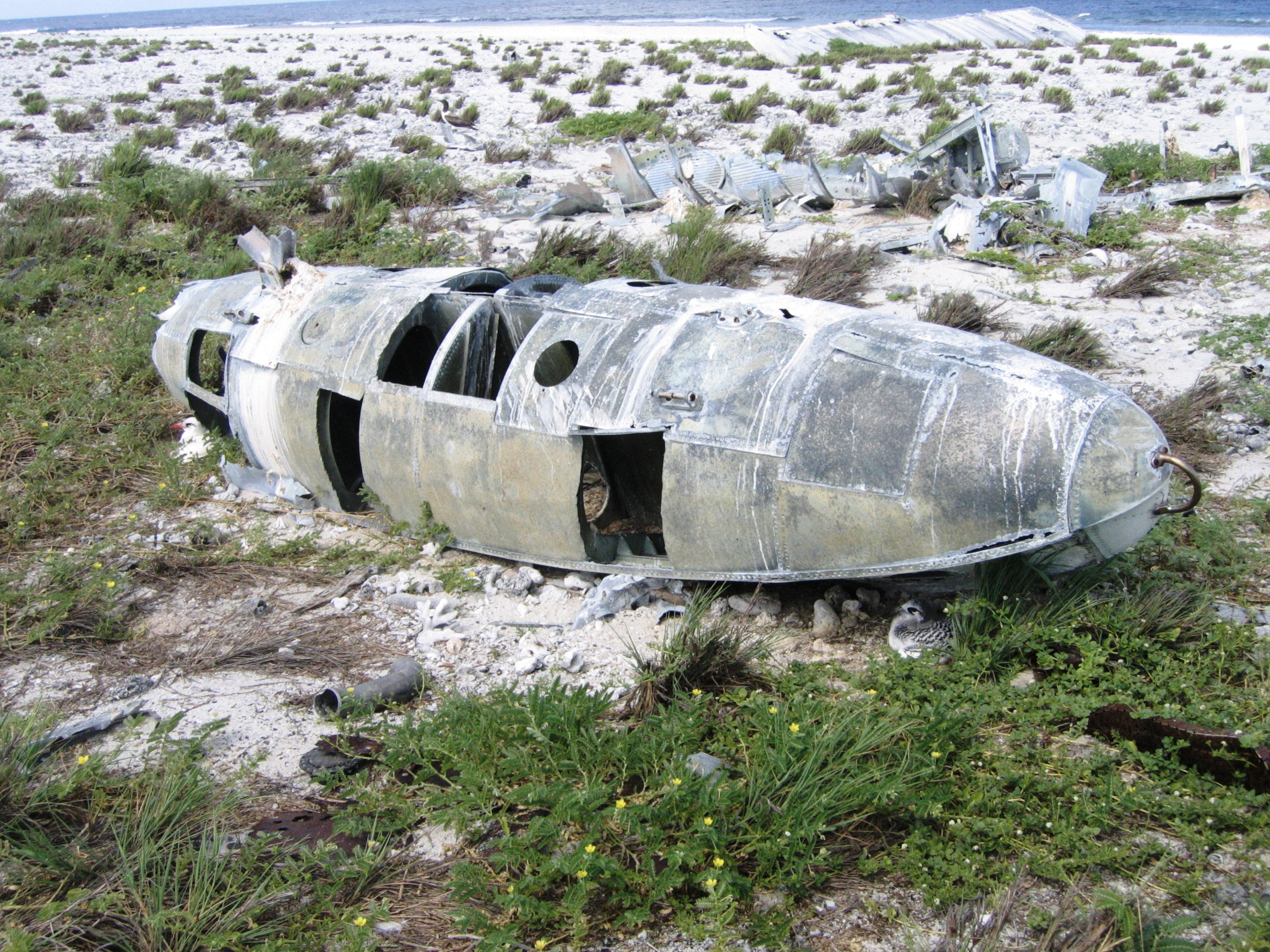
Aircraft wreckage on Howland

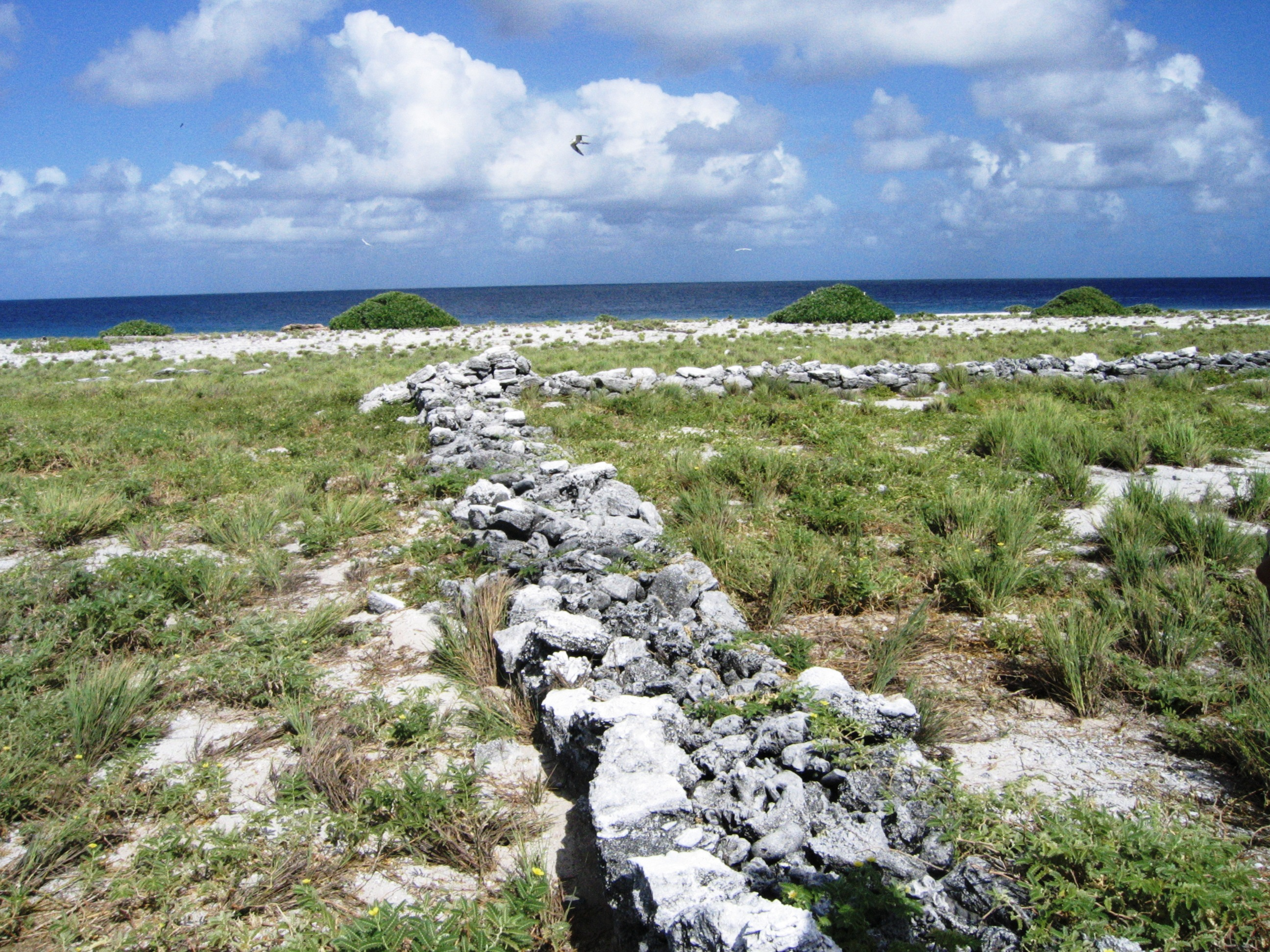
Itascatown settlement remains

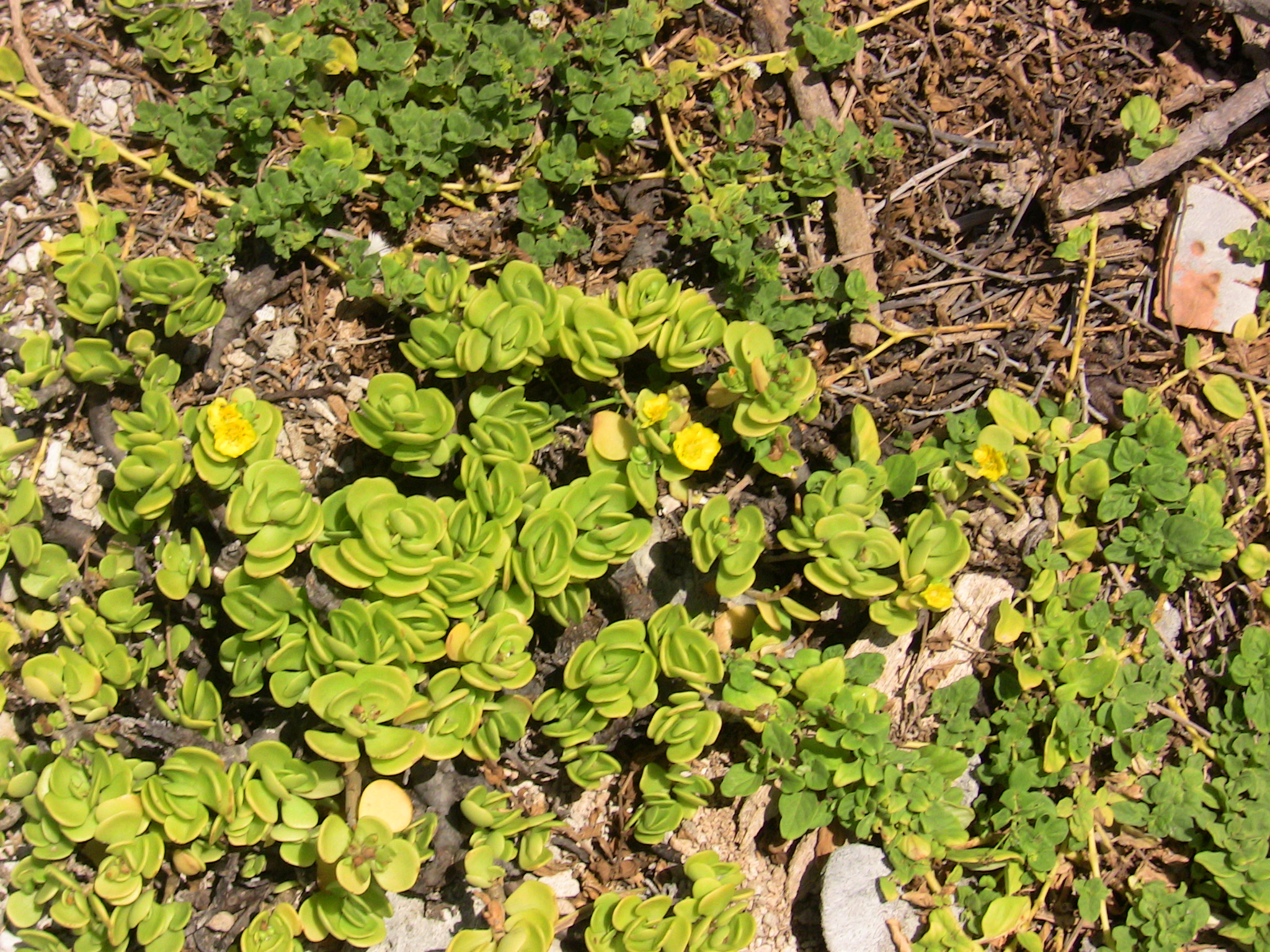
Howland Island flora

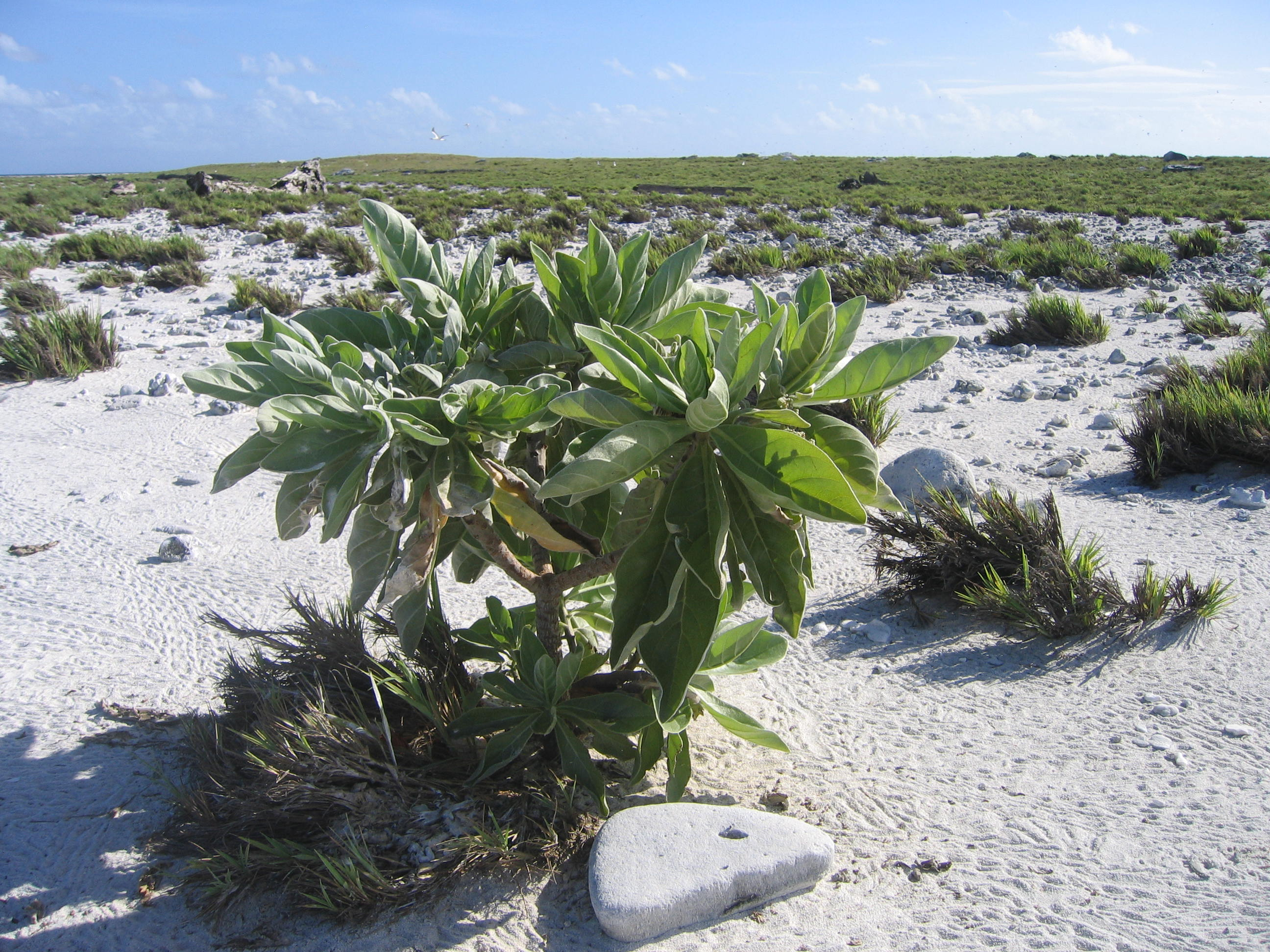
Howland Island flora (leeward)

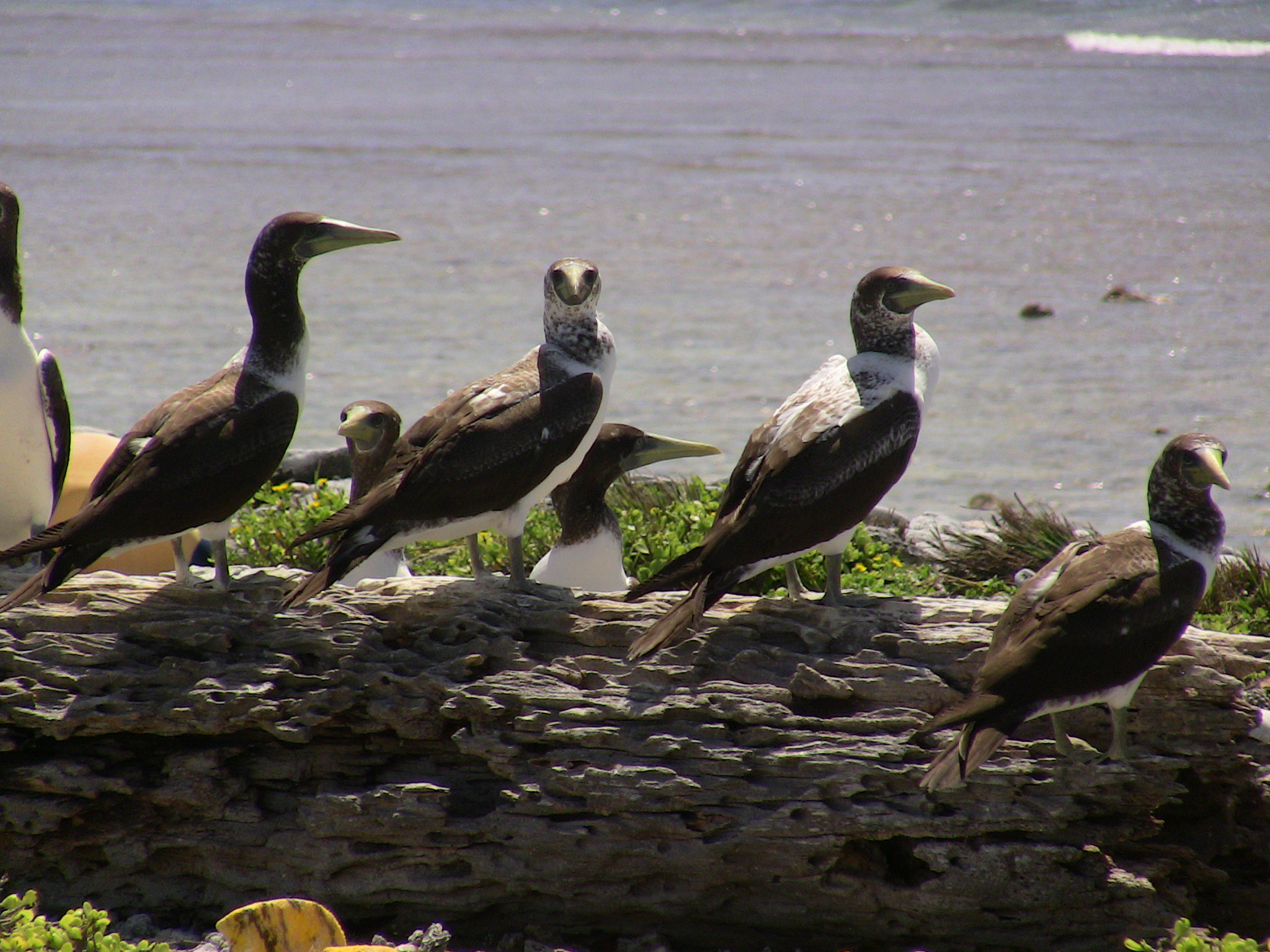
Young masked boobies

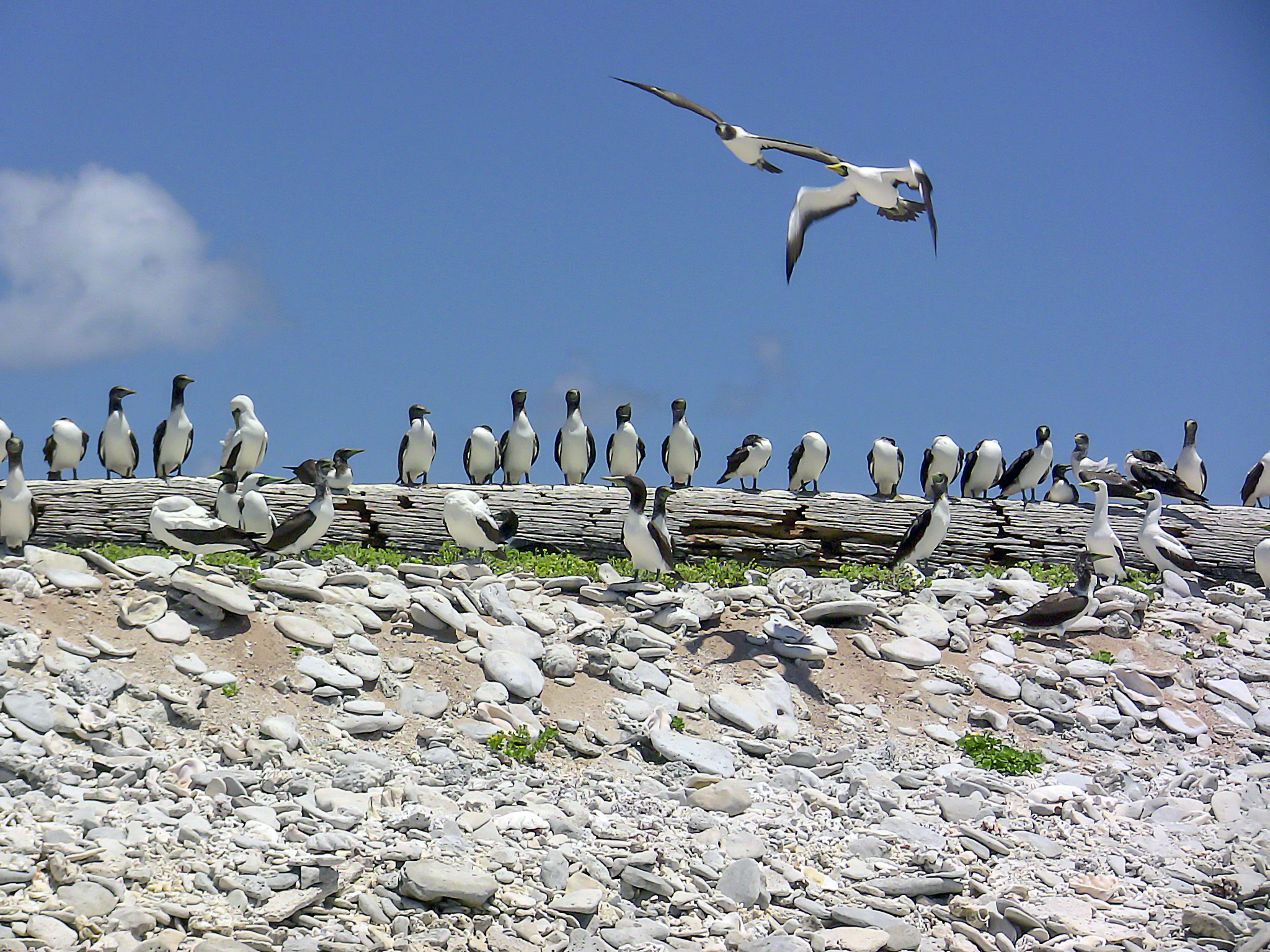
Masked boobies

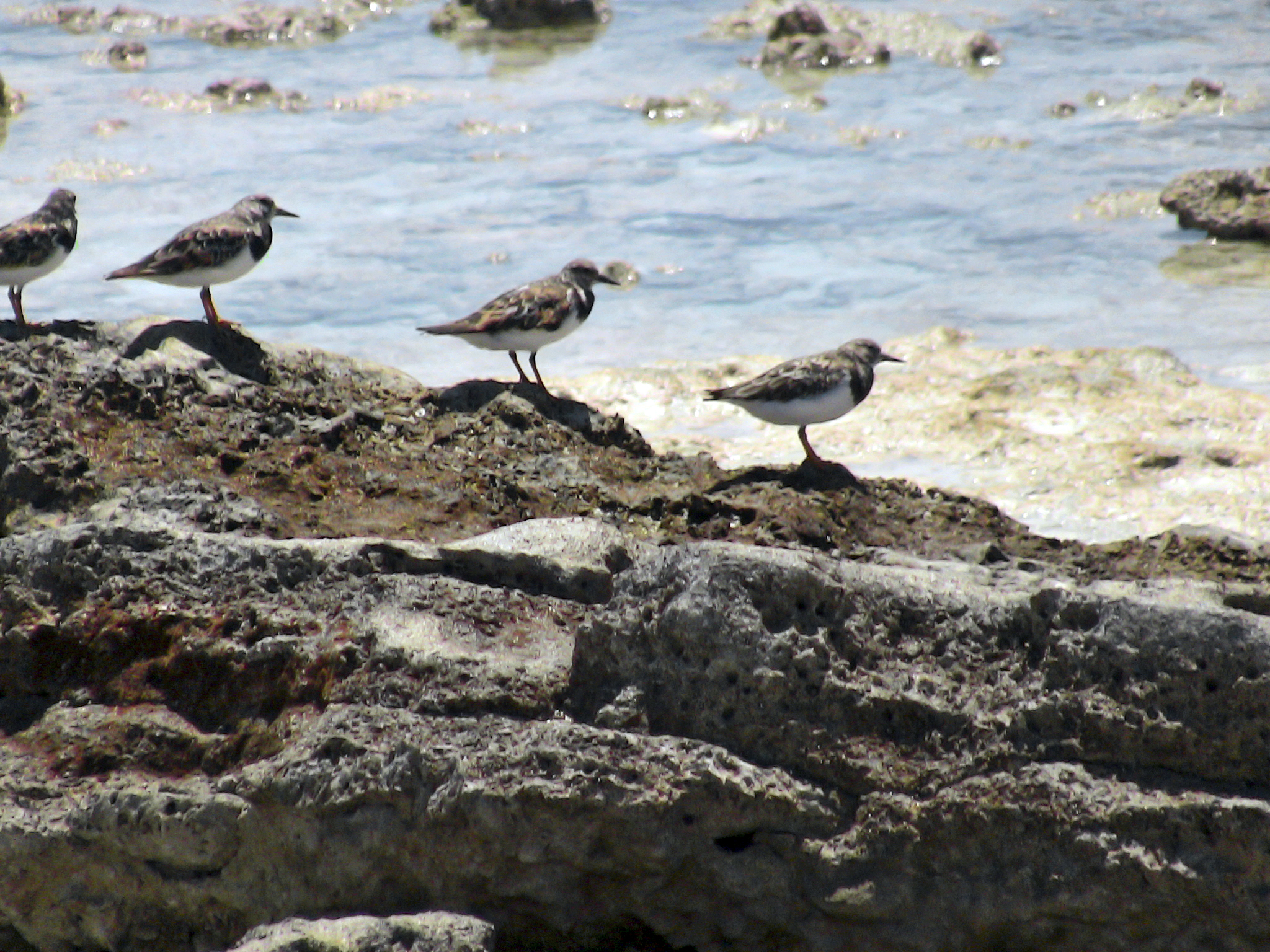
Ruddy turnstones

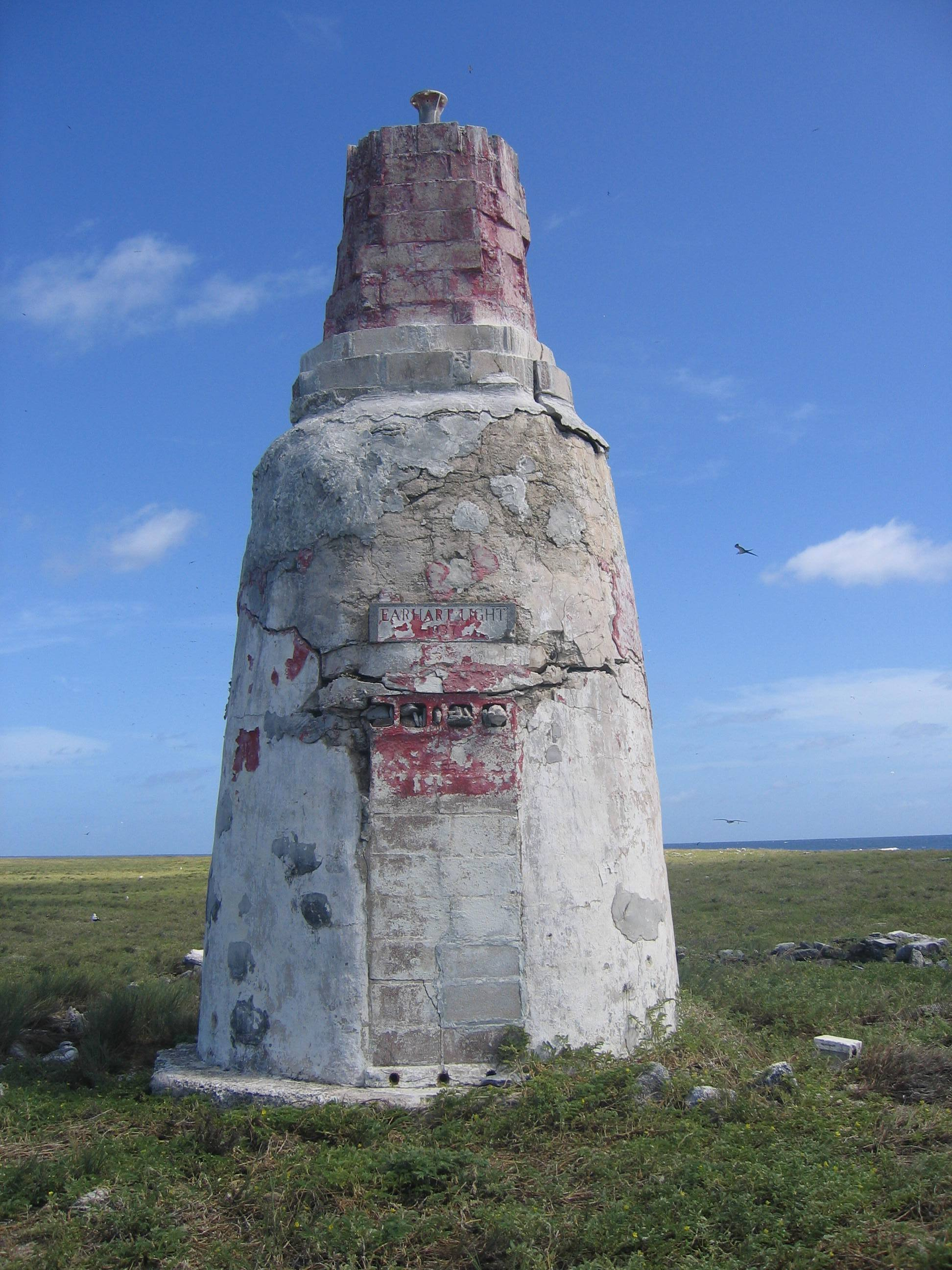
Earhart Light, 2008

== See also ==
- List of lighthouses in United States Minor Outlying Islands
- Howland and Baker islands, includes coverage of the Howland-Baker EEZ
- History of the Pacific Islands
- List of Guano Island claims
- Phoenix Islands
