= American Equatorial Islands Colonization Project =

Government policy

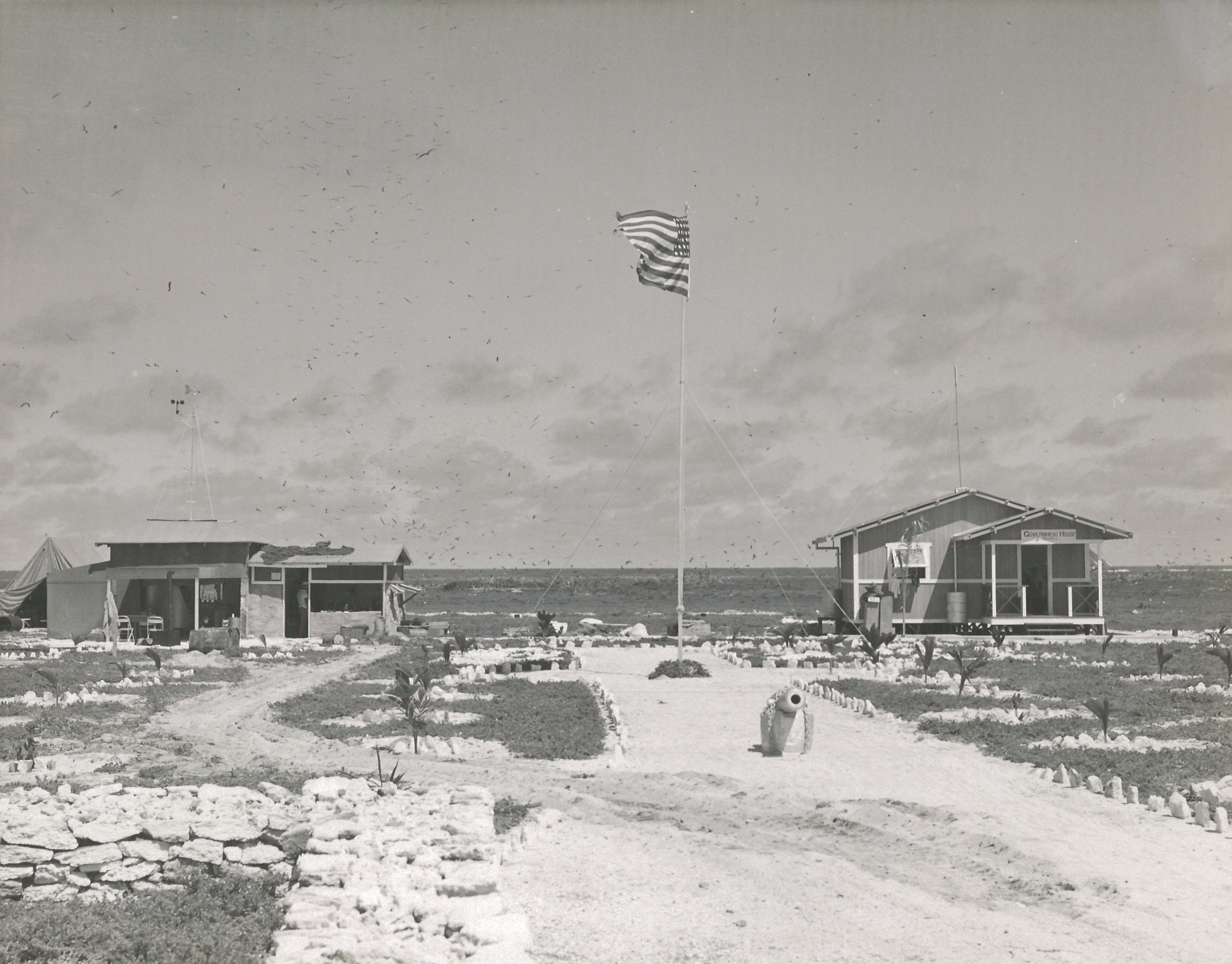
The makeshift camp built for settlers on Howland Island during the American Equatorial Islands Colonization Project.

The American Equatorial Islands Colonization Project was a plan initiated in 1935 by the United States Department of Commerce to place U.S. citizens on uninhabited Howland, Baker, and Jarvis Islands in the central Pacific Ocean so that weather stations and landing fields could be built for military and commercial use on air routes between Australia and California. Additionally, the U.S. government wanted to claim these remote islands to provide a check on eastern territorial expansion by the Empire of Japan.

During the seven years of colonization, more than 130 young men participated in the project, the majority of whom were primarily young Native Hawaiian men and other male students recruited from schools in Hawaii, who became known as Hui Panalāʻau. (Note: Hui Panalāʻau has been variously translated as "club of settlers of southern islands," "holders of the land society," and "society of colonists.")

In 1937, the project was expanded to include Canton and Enderbury in the Phoenix Islands.

On December 8, coinciding with the attack on Pearl Harbor, the three islands were bombed which killed two colonists. The islands continued to be attacked, and the project ended in early 1942, when the colonists were rescued from the islands at the start of the War in the Pacific.

== History ==
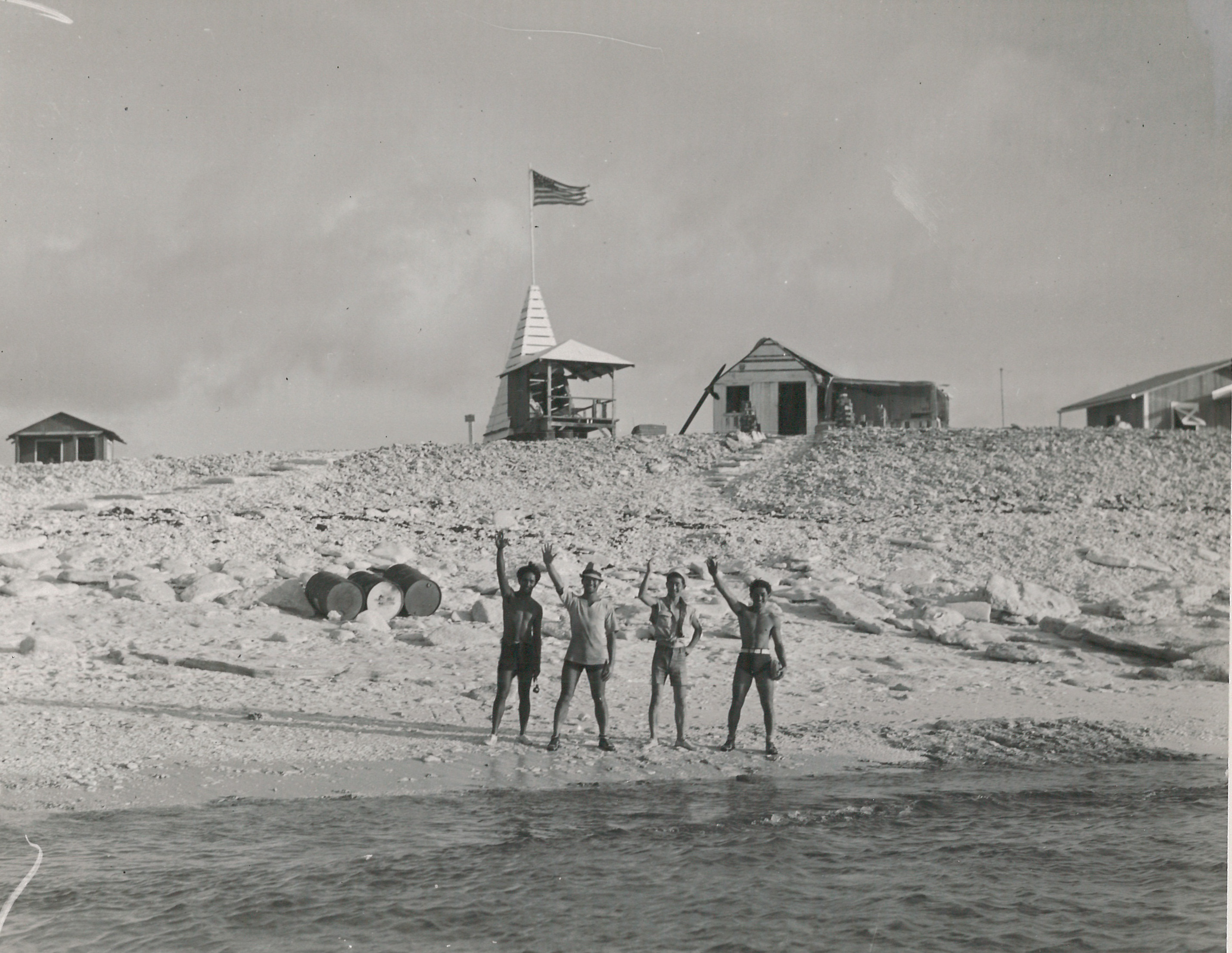
Colonists waving before they begin their stint as settlers on Jarvis Island.

The United States first began establishing its presence in the Equatorial Pacific during the mid-19th century through guano mining conducted by private American companies under the Guano Islands Act. After several decades, guano resources became depleted, leading to the diminishing presence of American companies on the islands; they were thus vulnerable to development and claim by other nations, especially the regional rival, Imperial Japan. The U.S. maintained a desire for military and commercial air routes between Australia and California, routes that would be facilitated by the use of Howland, Baker, and Jarvis Islands. In 1935, the Department of Commerce developed a clandestine colonization plan with the objective of placing U.S. citizens on the remote islands in order for the U.S. to lay claim to them. The colonization program called for non-active military personnel in order to avoid conflicting with international law regarding colonization by military.

William T. Miller, Superintendent of Airways at the Department of Commerce, was appointed to lead the project. He traveled to Hawaii in February 1935, met with Albert F. Judd, Trustee of Kamehameha Schools and the Bishop Museum, and agreed that recent graduates and students of the Kamehameha School for Boys would make ideal colonists for the project.

Multiple federal agencies vied for the right to administer the colonization project, including the Department of Commerce, the Department of the Interior, and the Department of the Navy. However, jurisdiction was ultimately granted to the Department of the Interior.

In 1940, when the issue of discontinuing the colonization project was raised, the Navy acknowledged that the islands were "probably worthless to commercial aviation" but advocated for "continued occupation" because the islands could serve as "bases from a military standpoint."

== End of the program ==
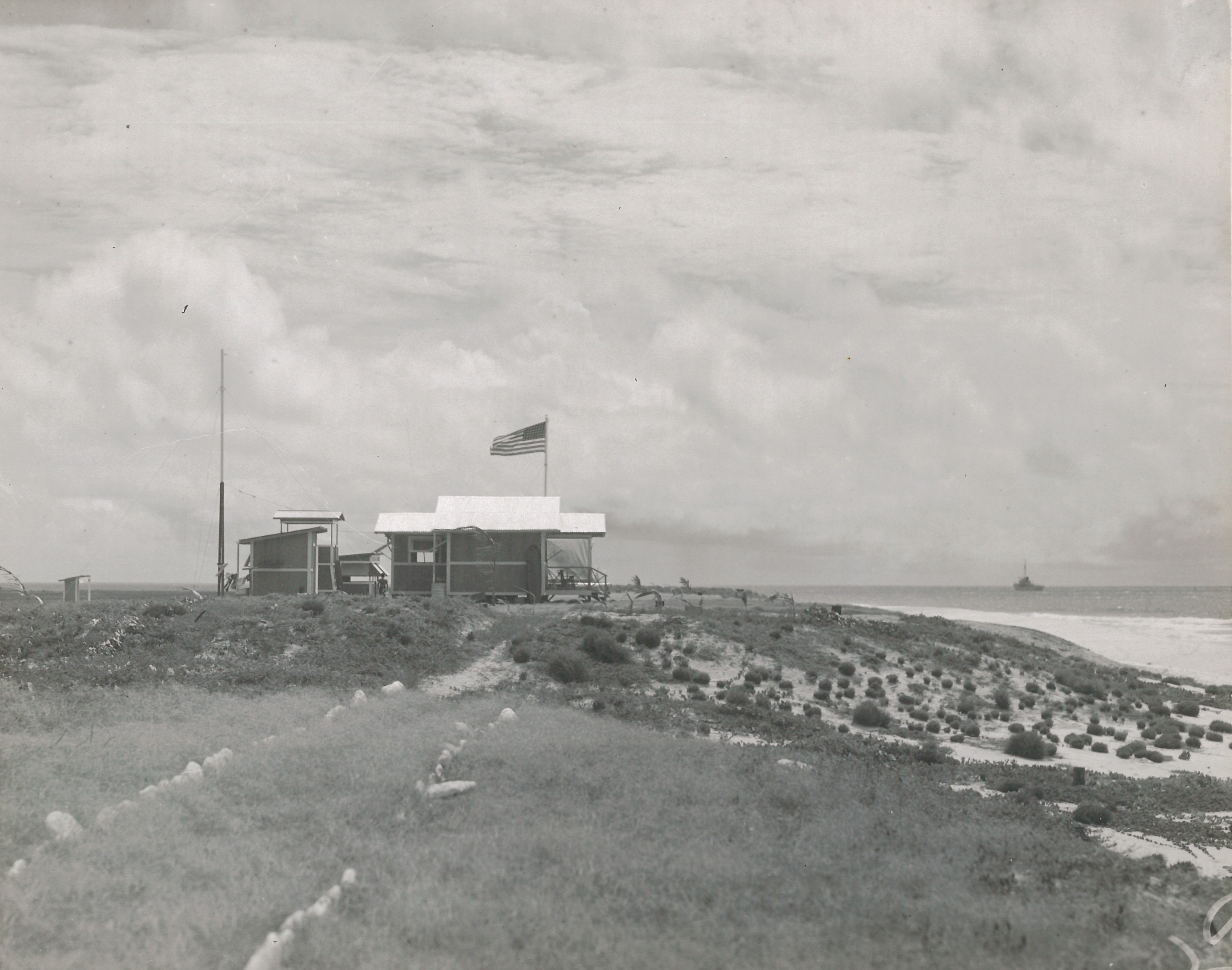
Camp on Baker Island during the Colonization Project

In June 1941, the Commandant of the 14th Naval District recognized the "tension in the Western Pacific" and recommended the evacuation of the colonists, but his request was denied. On December 8, 1941, Howland Island was attacked by a fleet of Japanese twin-engine bombers, which killed Hawaiian colonists Joseph Keliʻihananui and Richard Whaley. In the ensuing weeks, Japanese submarine and military aircraft continued to target Howland, Baker, and Jarvis Islands. The four colonists from Baker and the two remaining colonists from Howland were rescued on January 31, 1942, and the eight colonists from Jarvis and Enderbury were rescued on February 9, 1942, two months after the initial attacks on Howland Island. In July 1943, a military base was established on Baker Island and played a substantial role in the Tarawa-Makin operation, a significant U.S. offensive against the Japanese fleet in the Pacific theater.

After World War II, the participants of the colonization project established an organization to preserve the fellowship of their group, naming it "Hui Panalāʻau" in 1956. In 1974, the islands of Howland, Baker and Jarvis were designated as National Wildlife Refuges and are now part of the Pacific Islands Heritage Marine National Monument. The islands of Canton and Enderbury became part of the Republic of Kiribati.

== See also ==
- Phoenix Islands Settlement Scheme

== Gallery ==
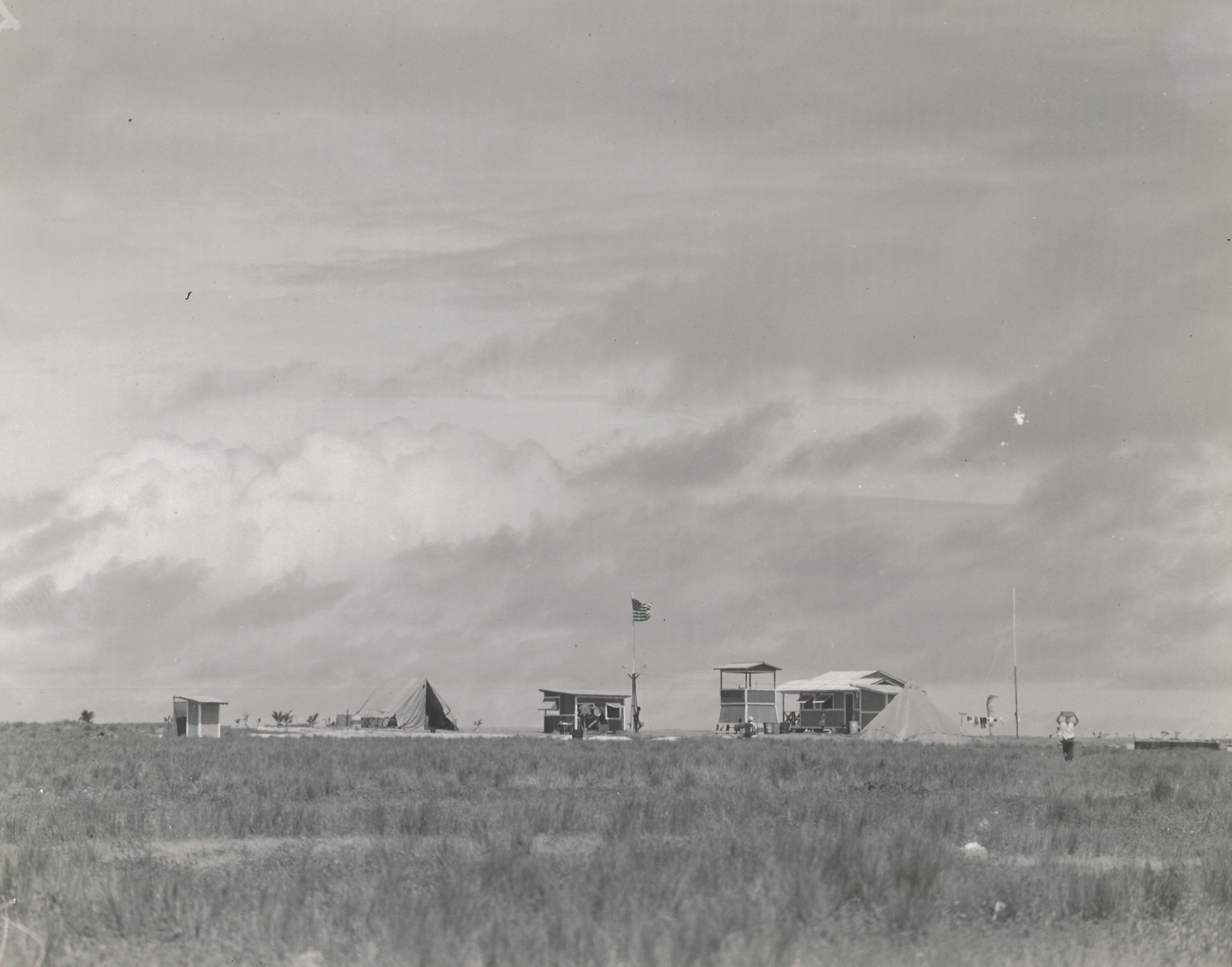
Settlements on Baker Island

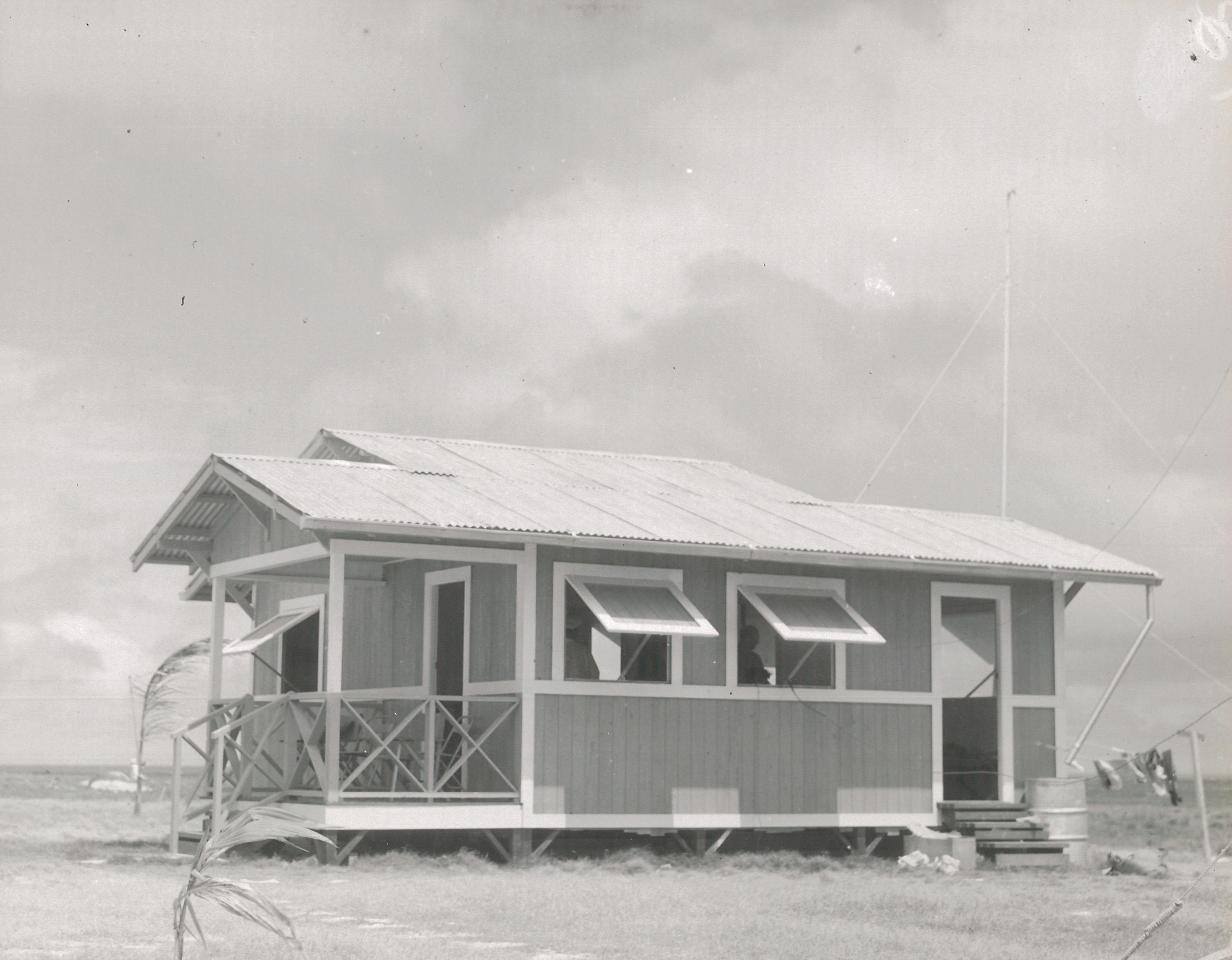
Baker Island Government House

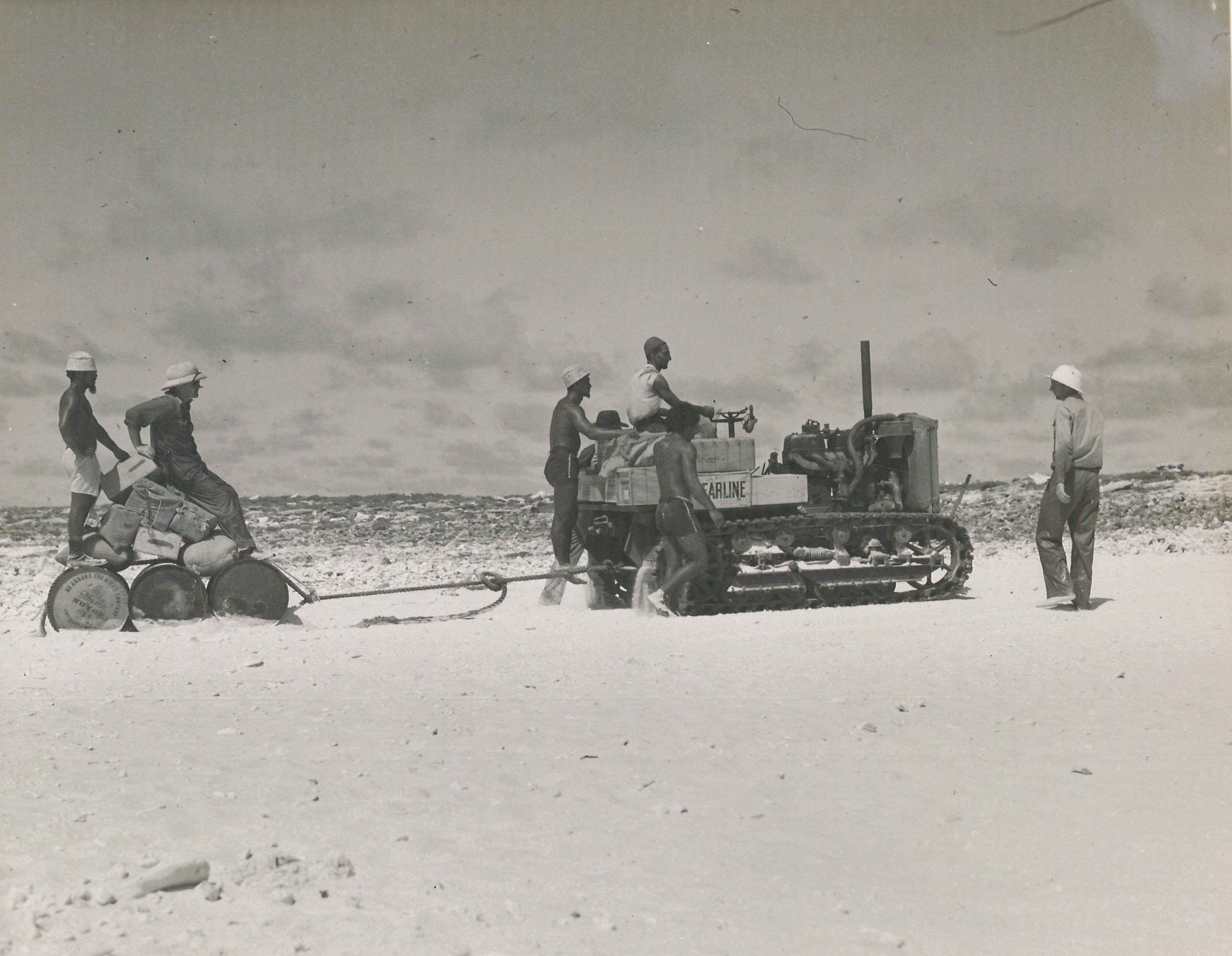
Moving drums of water onto Howland Island

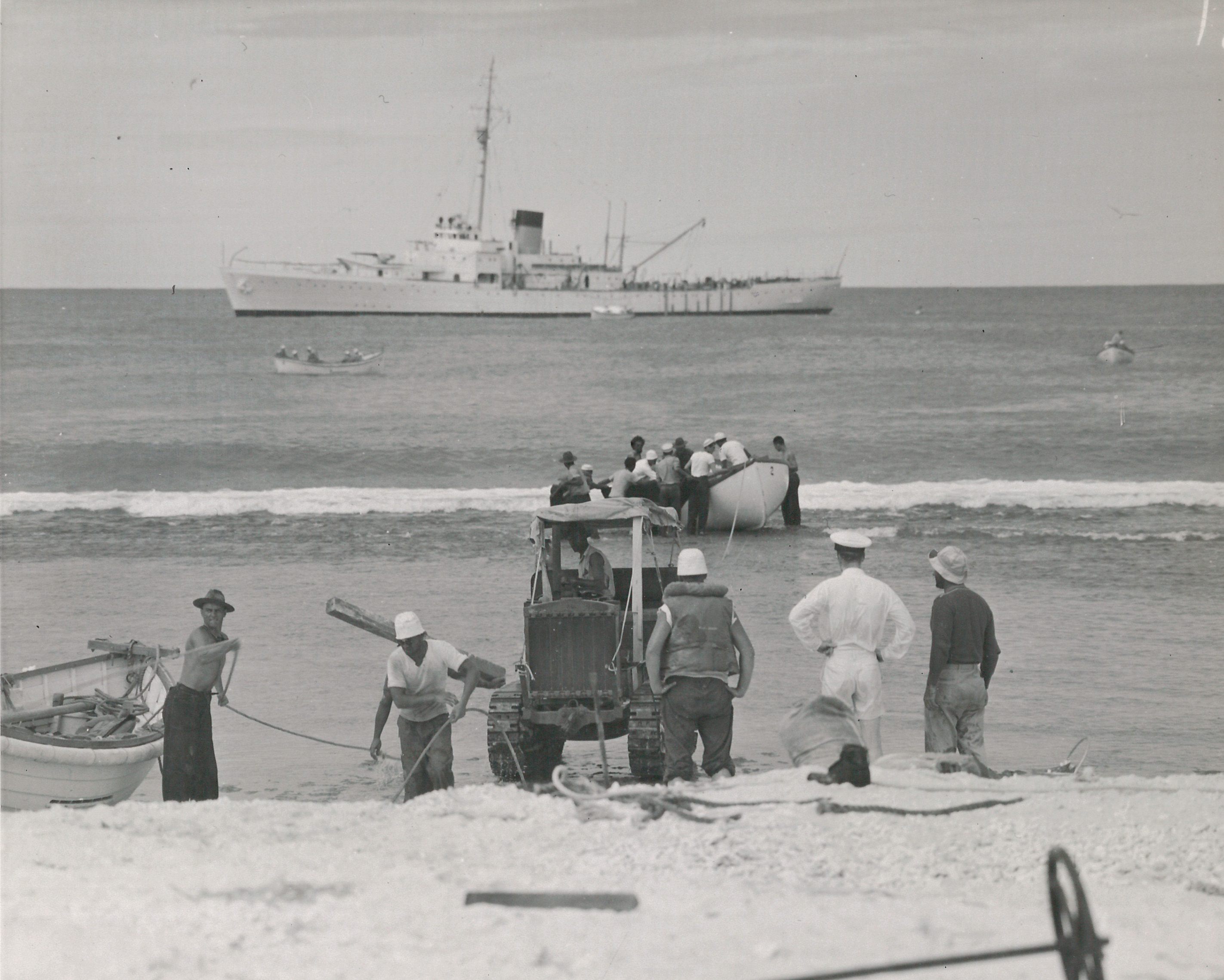
Supply delivery to Howland Island

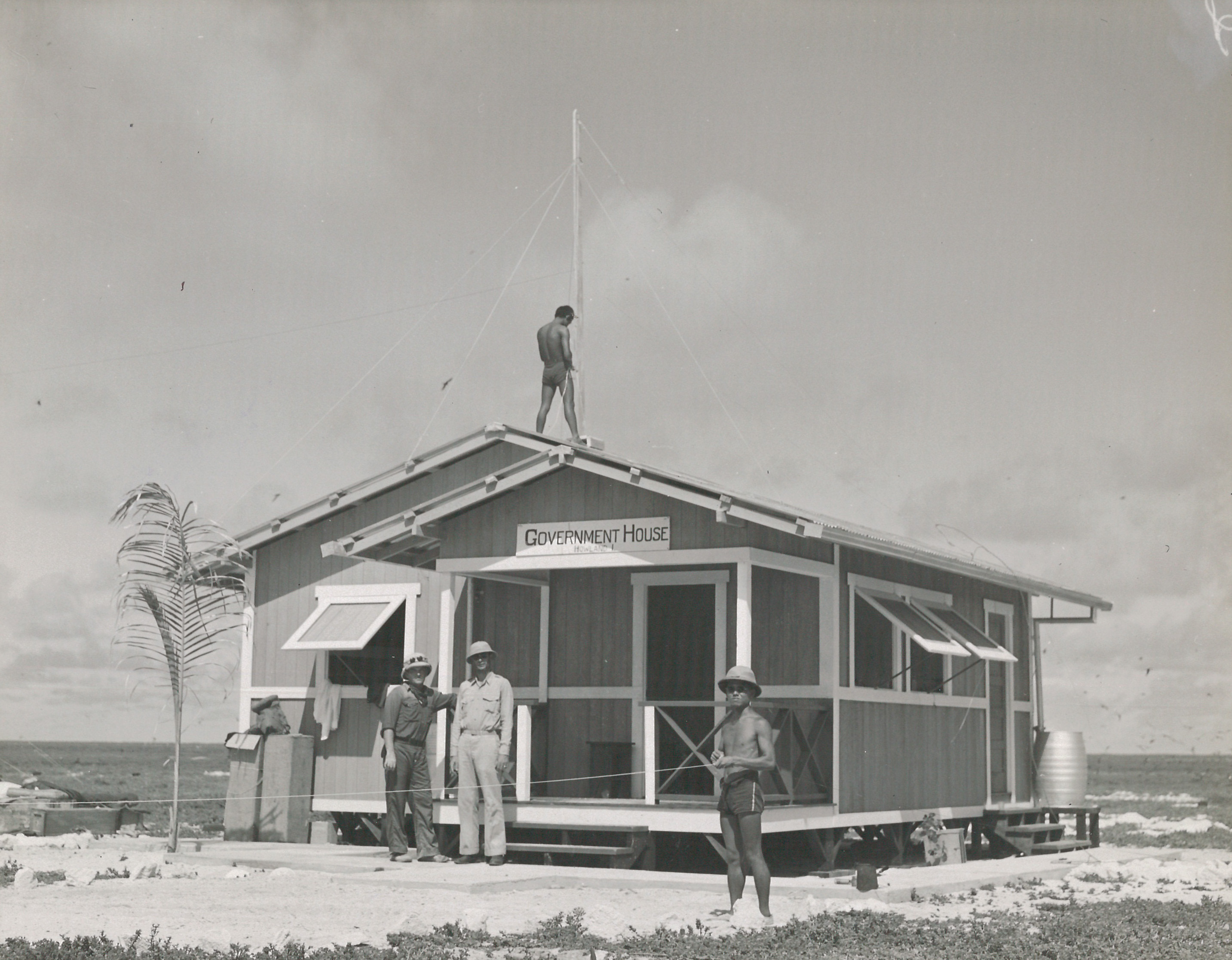
Howland Island Government House

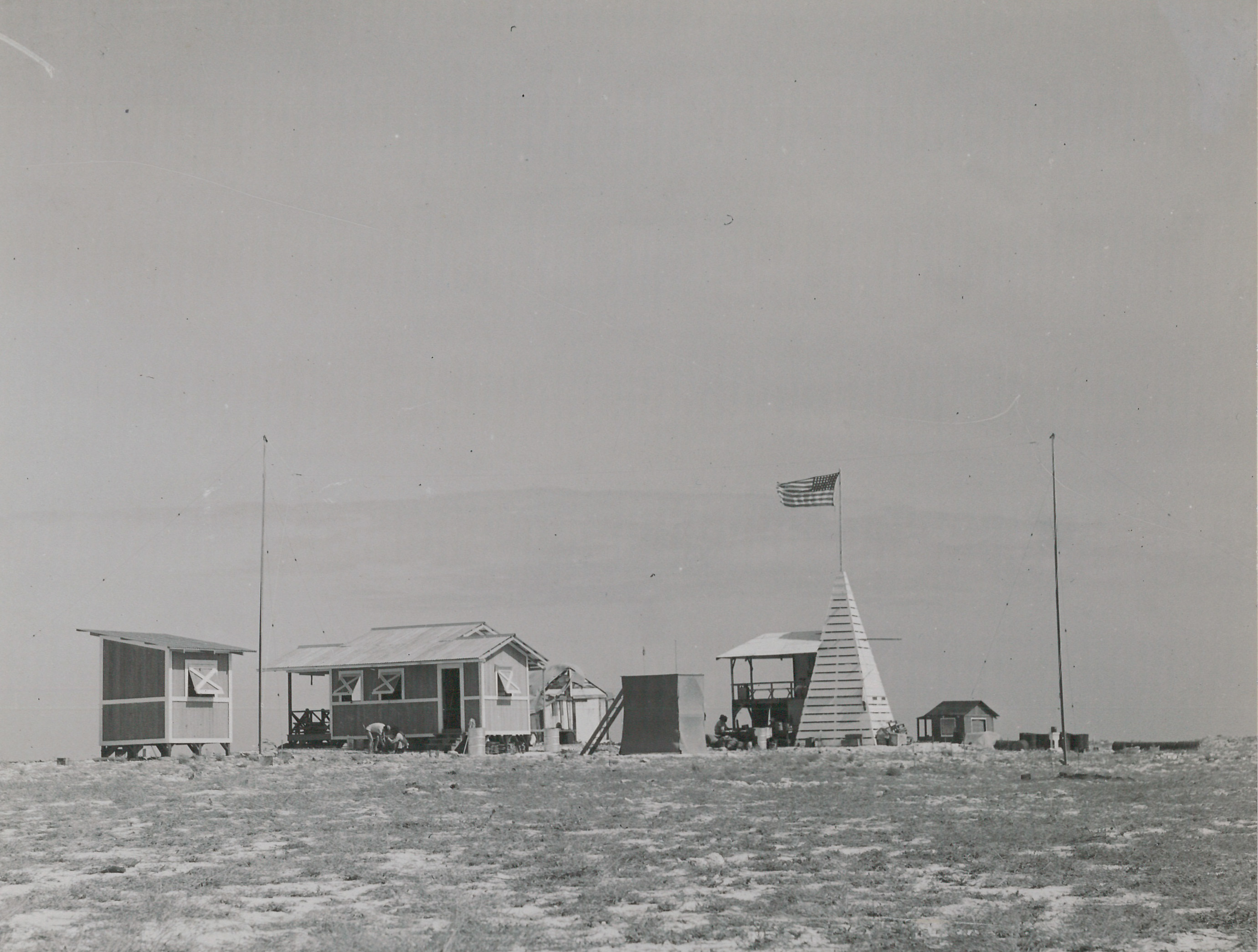
Jarvis Island camp

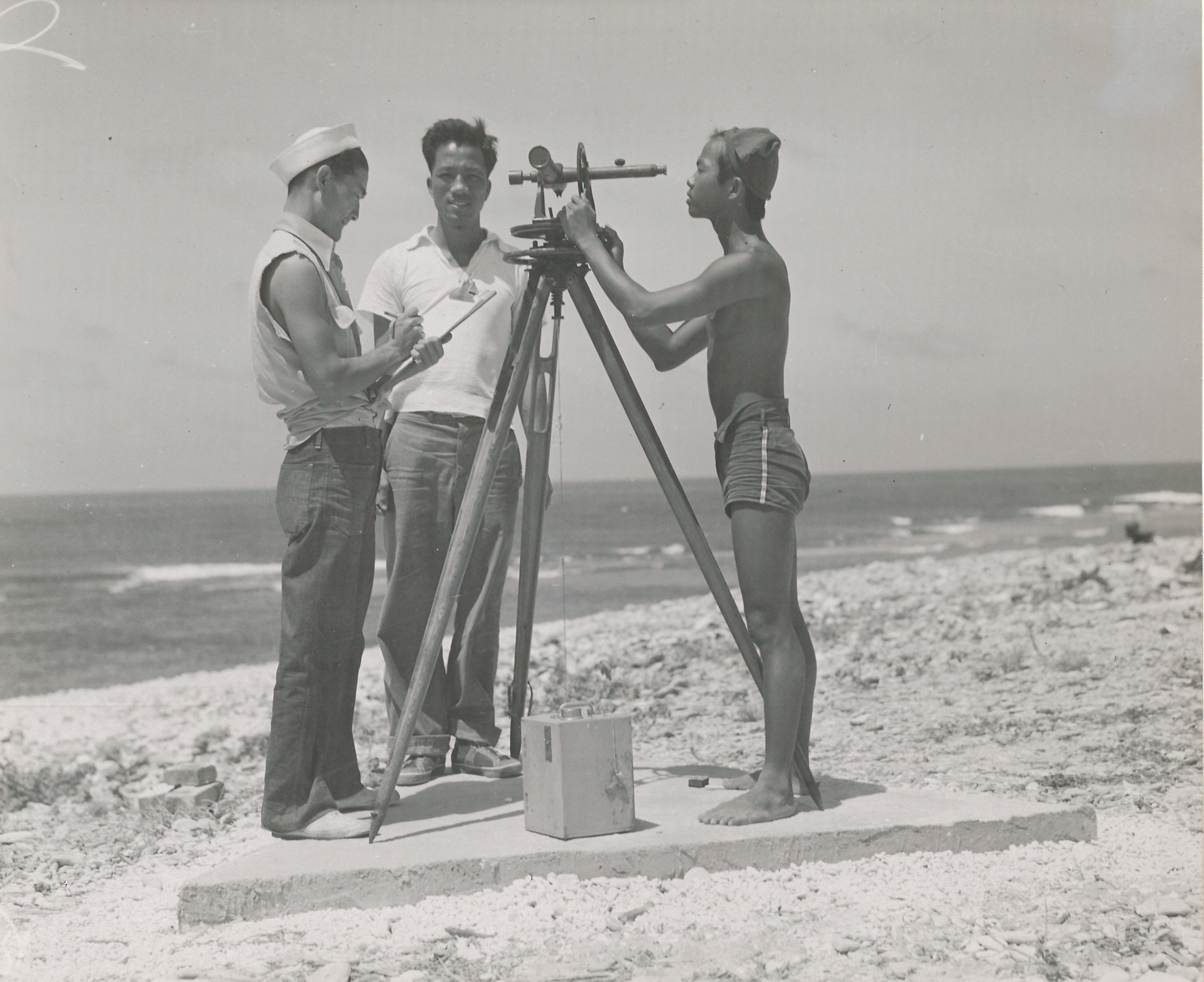
Balloon run at Jarvis Island

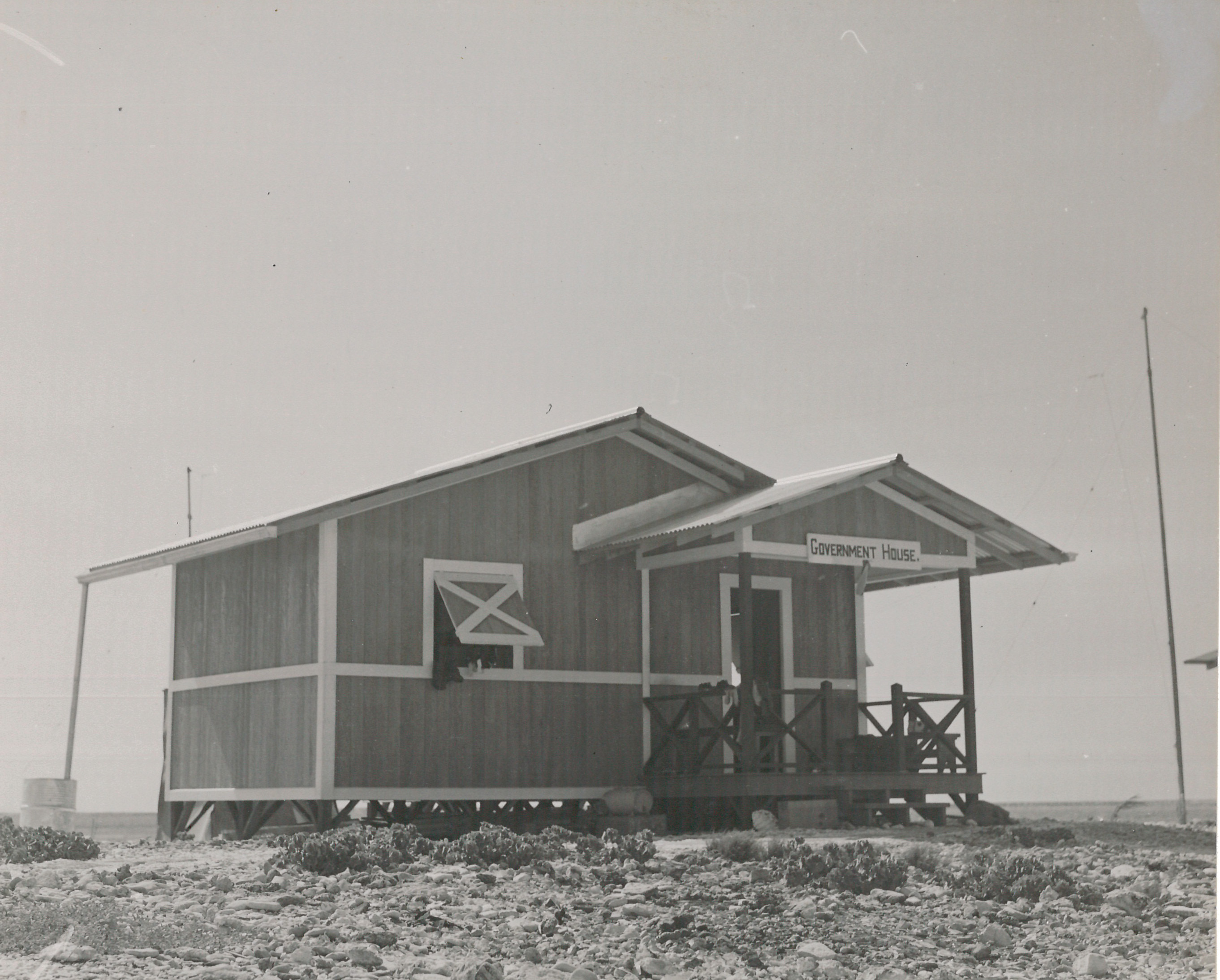
Jarvis Island Government House

== External link ==
- The Hui Panalāʻau Digital Gallery
