= Baker Island =

Pacific atoll of the United States

Nickname: New Nantucket
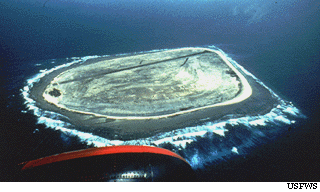
- U.S. Fish and Wildlife Service aerial view of Baker Island

- Location within Oceania

Geography
- Location: Pacific Ocean
- Coordinates: 0°11′45″N 176°28′45″W
- Area: 2.1 km^{2} (0.81 sq mi)
- Length: 1.81 km (1.125 mi)
- Width: 1.13 km (0.702 mi)
- Coastline: 4.8 km (2.98 mi)
- Highest elevation: 8 m (26 ft)

Administration
- United States
- Status: Unincorporated

Demographics
- Population: 0 (2025)

Additional information
- Time zone: International Date Line West (UTC−12:00)
- Baker Island National Wildlife Refuge
- IUCN category Ia (strict nature reserve)
- Designated: 1974
- Website: www.fws.gov/refuge/baker-island

Baker Island, once known as New Nantucket in the early 19th century, is a small, uninhabited atoll located just north of the Equator in the central Pacific Ocean, approximately 1,920 miles (3,090 kilometres) southwest of Honolulu. Positioned almost halfway between Hawaii and Australia, its closest neighbor is Howland Island, situated 42 mi (68 km) to the north-northwest. Both Baker and Howland Islands have been claimed as territories of the United States since 1857, though the United Kingdom regarded them as part of the British Empire between 1897 and 1936 but did not actually annex them. They were not being used when a U.S. colonization attempt was started in 1935, and the next year formal reassertion of U.S. sovereignty was issued. During World War II the Japanese Empire attacked the island, and it was evacuated and a small military base was established. The island was an important navigation beacon in the remote Pacific waters during and after World War II. In the 1970s it was made into a nature preserve and has remained so into the 21st century.

Covering an area of 0.81 sq mi (2.1 km^{2}), with 3.0 mi (4.8 km) of coastline, Baker Island experiences an equatorial climate, characterized by average temperatures around 80 °F (27 °C), minimal rainfall, persistent winds, and strong sunlight. The terrain is flat and sandy, surrounded by a narrow fringing reef. Unlike many atolls, Baker Island lacks a central lagoon, with its highest point being 26 ft (7.9 m) above sea level.

Today, Baker Island is part of the Baker Island National Wildlife Refuge, an unincorporated and unorganized territory of the U.S. The island is managed by the U.S. Fish and Wildlife Service and is visited annually for conservation purposes. Statistically, Baker Island is grouped with the United States Minor Outlying Islands and, along with Howland Island, is among the last places on Earth to experience the New Year, operating in the UTC−12:00 time zone, just east of the International Date Line. It is one of the most remote U.S. possessions in the equatorial Pacific.

== Description ==
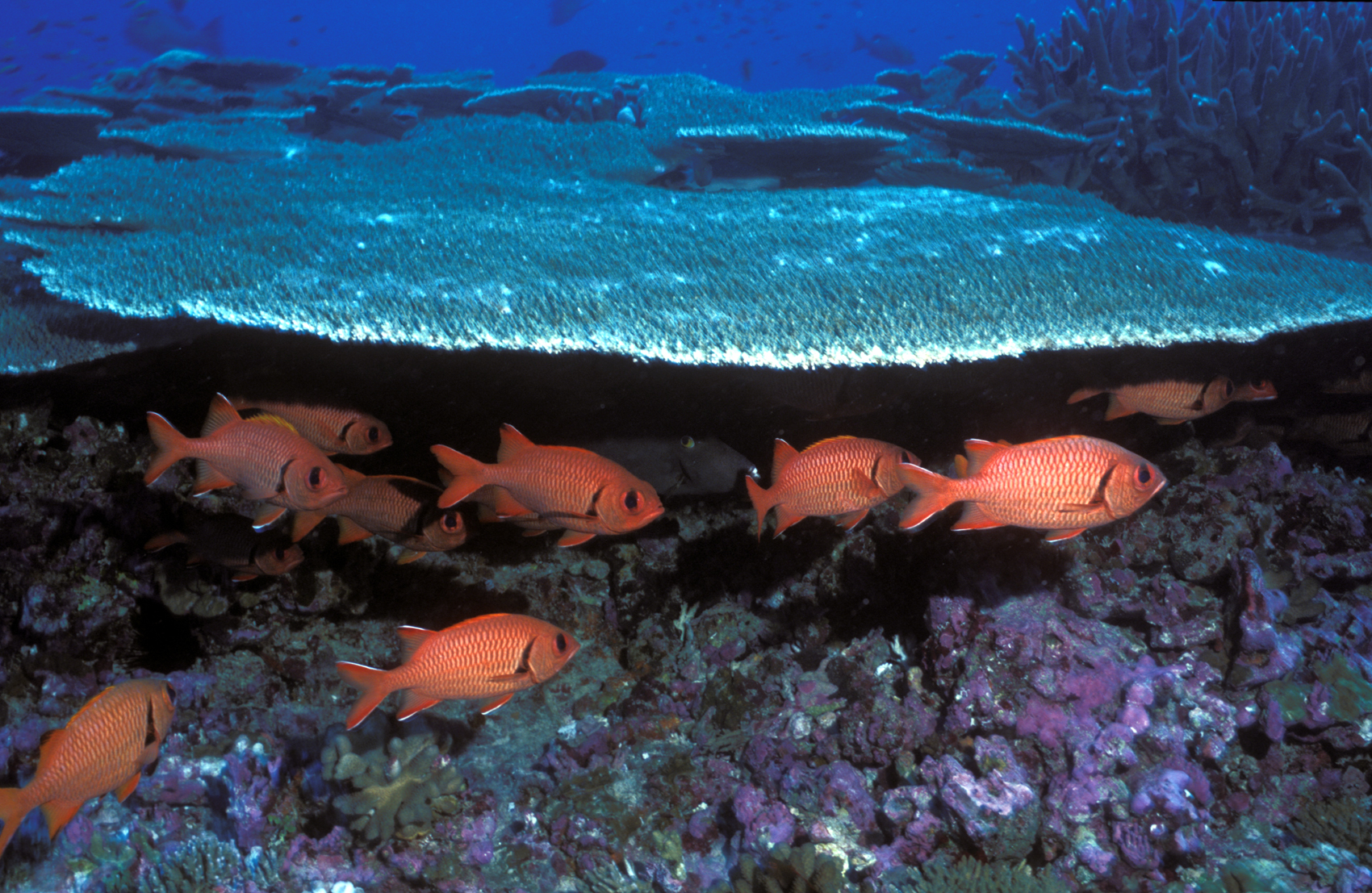
Soldierfish among Baker Island corals

A cemetery and remnants from previous settlements are located near the middle of Baker Island's west coast, where the boat landing area is situated. There are no ports or harbors on the island, and offshore anchorage is prohibited. The narrow fringing reef surrounding Baker Island presents a significant maritime hazard, making access to the shore difficult. To aid in navigation, a day beacon is positioned near the site of the former village.

Baker Island's abandoned World War II runway, which measures 5,463 ft (1,665 m) in length, is now completely overgrown with vegetation and is unserviceable.

The United States asserts an exclusive economic zone (EEZ) extending 200 nautical miles (370 km) and a territorial sea of 12 nmi (22 km) around the Island.

During a colonization attempt from 1935 to 1942, Baker Island was likely operating on Hawaii time, which was then 10.5 hours behind UTC. Today, the island remains uninhabited, and its time zone is unspecified, though it falls within a nautical time zone 12 hours behind UTC (UTC−12:00). Since Kiribati moved across the international date line, Baker Island is the last place on Earth to chronologically enter a New Year.

== History ==
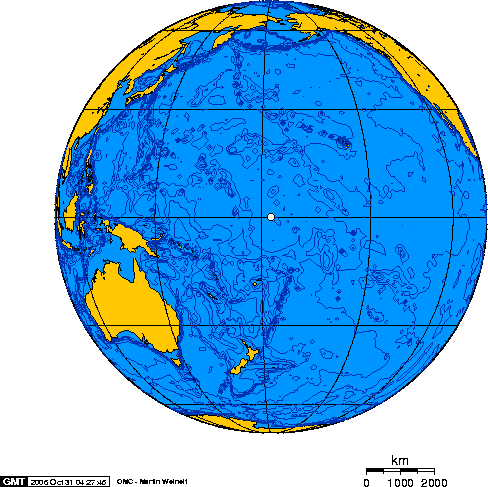
Orthographic projection over Baker Island

Baker Island was first discovered in 1818 by Captain Elisha Folger of the Nantucket whaling ship Equator, who named the island "New Nantucket". In August 1825, it was sighted again by Captain Obed Starbuck aboard the Loper, another Nantucket whaler. The island later took its name from Captain Michael Baker, who visited it in 1834. Some accounts suggest that Baker visited the island earlier, in 1832, and returned on August 14, 1839, aboard the whaler Gideon Howland, where he reportedly buried an American seaman. Captain Baker formerly claimed the island in 1855 and subsequently sold his interest to a group that later established the American Guano Company.

The United States officially took possession of Baker Island in 1857 under the Guano Islands Act of 1856. The island's guano deposits were mined by the American Guano Company from 1859 until 1878. Workers from various parts of the Pacific, including Hawaiʻi, were brought in for the mining operations. The Hawaiian laborers referred to Baker Island as "Puaka‘ilima", named after the ilima flower. The scale of guano extraction can be illustrated by ship movements in late 1868, where several ships, including the British vessel Montebello and the American ship Eldorado, transported tons of guano to Liverpool, England.

In February 1869, the British ship Shaftsbury, captained by John Davies, was wrecked on Baker's Island reef after a sudden wind shift and squall caused the ship to drag its moorings. Later that year, the American ship Robin Hood was destroyed by fire while loading guano.

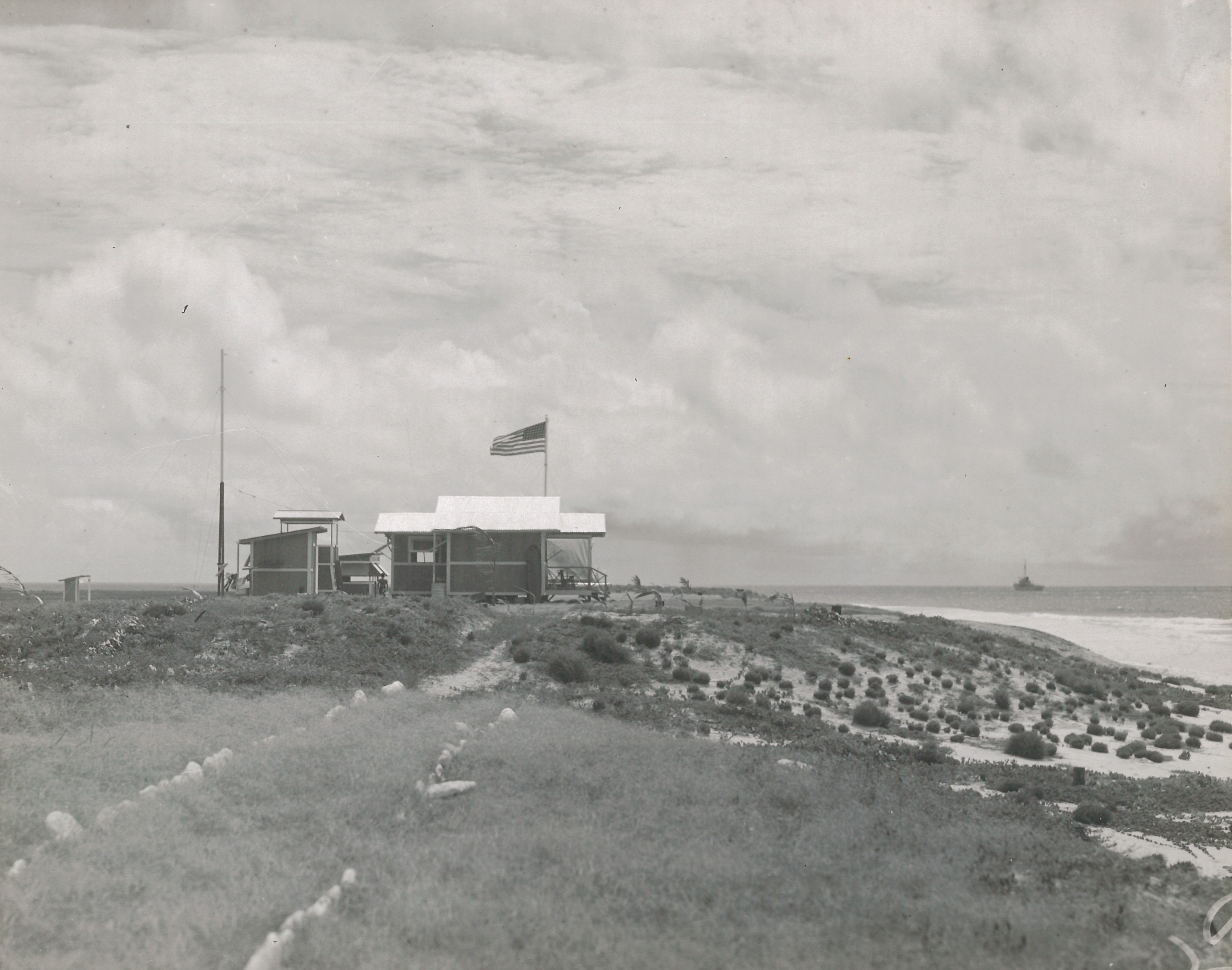
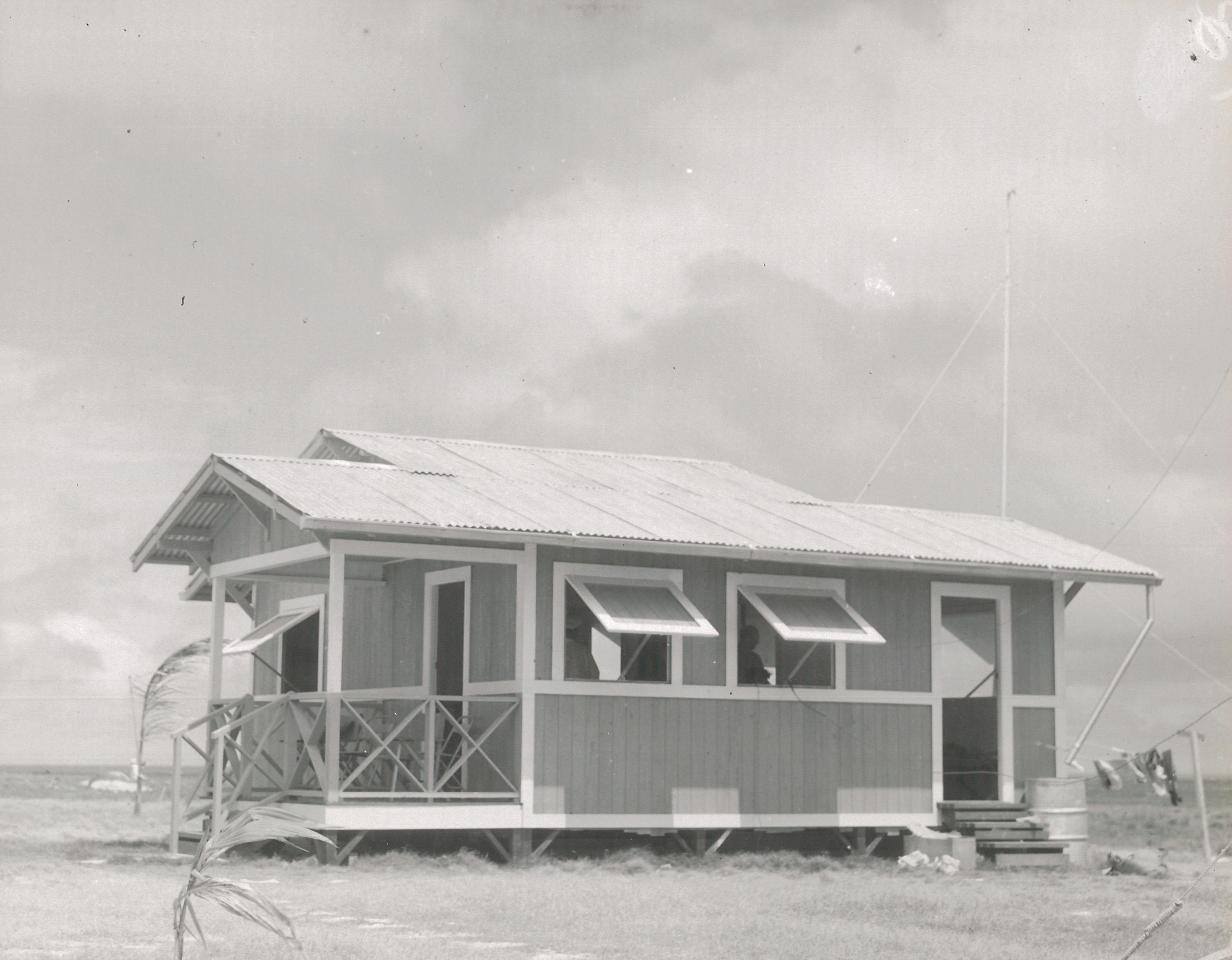
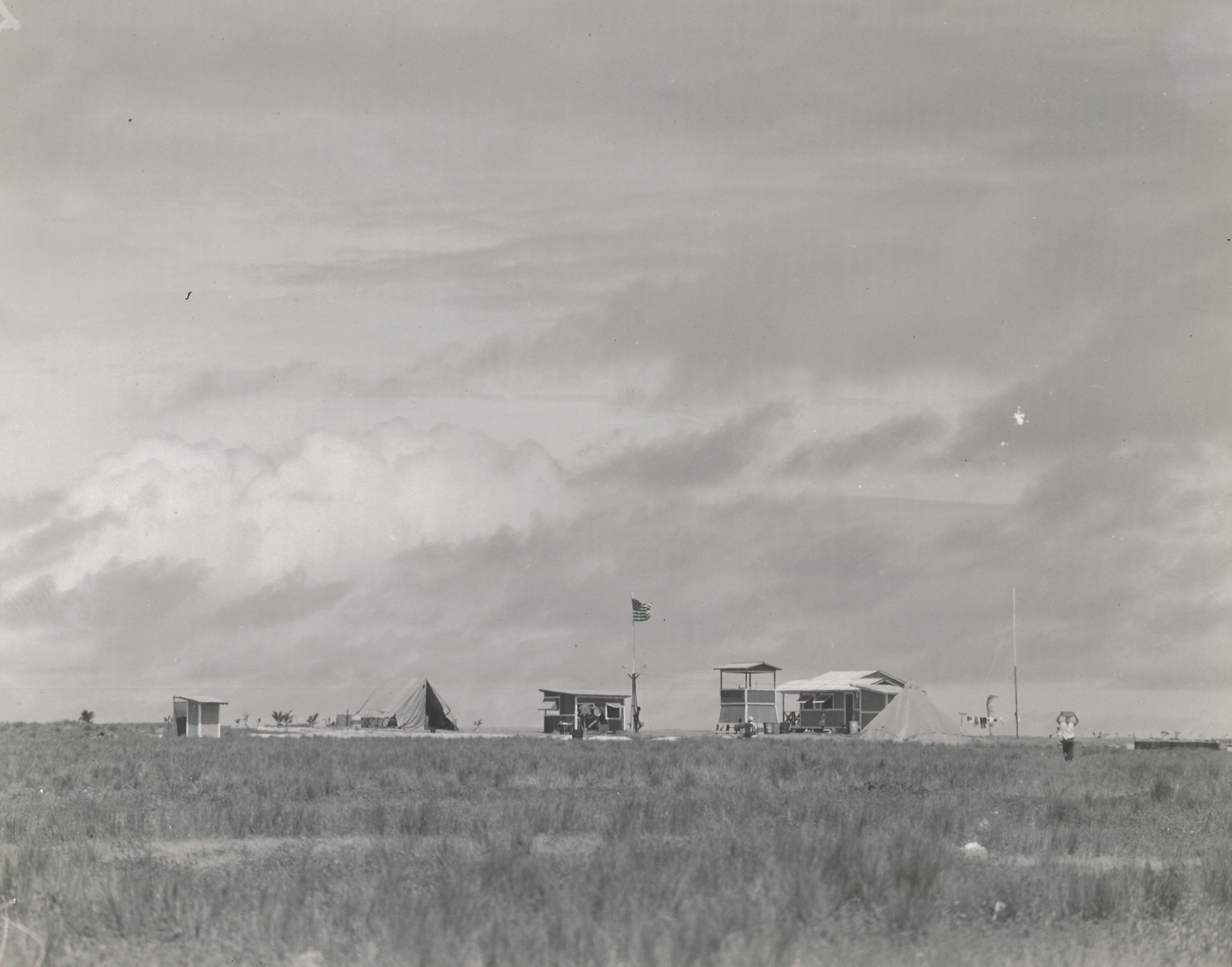
Settlers erected makeshift campsites on Baker Island during the American Equatorial Islands Colonization Project.

On December 7, 1886, the American Guano Company sold its rights to the British firm John T. Arundel and Company. The company then used Baker Island as its headquarters for guano operations in the Pacific from 1886 to 1891. Believing that the U.S. had abandoned its claim, Arundel applied to the British Colonial Office in 1897 for a license to work the island. While the United Kingdom considered Baker Island a British territory, they never formally annexed it. The U.S. reasserted its claim in the early 1920s, and after diplomatic discussions, they initiated the American Equatorial Islands Colonization Project in 1935. In May 1936, Executive Order 7368 was issued to reaffirm U.S. sovereignty.

During the American Equatorial Islands Colonization Project, American settlers set up temporary camps on Baker Island. As part of the colonization effort, American settlers arrived on Baker Island aboard the USCGC Itasca, which also brought colonists to neighboring Howland Island, on April 3, 1935, establishing a settlement named Meyerton. The settlers built a lighthouse and dwellings and attempted to cultivate plants. However, most of these efforts were unsuccessful due to the island's harsh conditions, including its dry climate and the impact of seabirds. Meyerton's population was recorded as three American civilians in the 1940 U.S. Census. The settlement was eventually evacuated in 1942 following Japanese attacks during World War II, and the U.S. military forces subsequently occupied the island. The town was named for Captain H. A. Meyer, United States Army, who assisted in establishing living quarters and rainwater cisterns for the colonists. It was located on the west side of the island, at an elevation of 13 feet (4.0 m) above sea level.

== Airfield ==
Baker Island Day Beacon
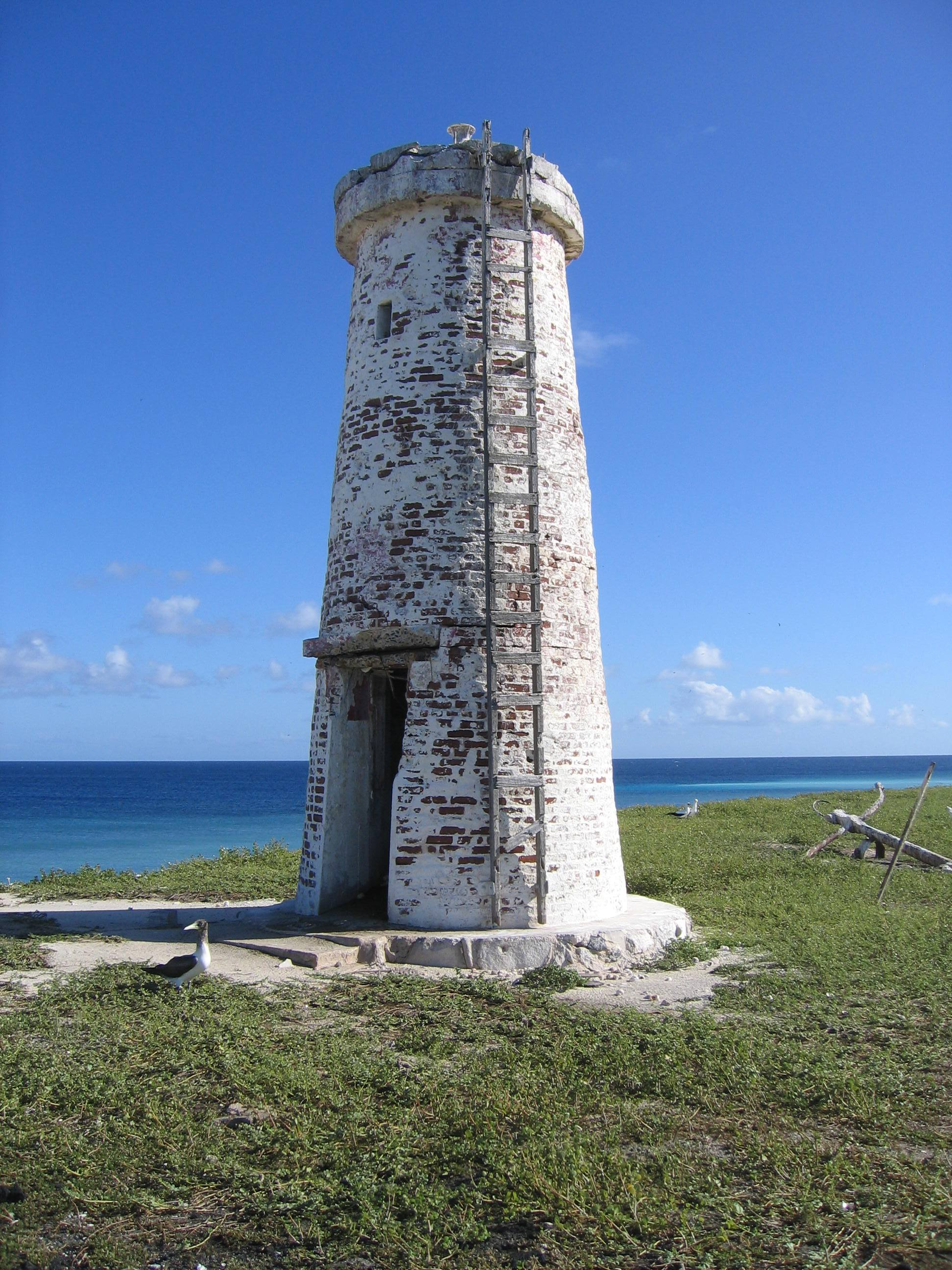
- Baker Island Light
- Location: Baker Island, Baker Island, United States
- Coordinates: 0°11′45″N 176°29′03″W

Tower
- Constructed: 1935
- Construction: brick
- Height: 5 m (16 ft)
- Shape: cylindrical tower, no lantern
- Markings: White

Light
- Deactivated: 1942

On August 11, 1943, a U.S. Army defense force arrived on Baker Island as part of the broader Gilbert and Marshall Islands campaign during World War II. By September 1943, the Army had constructed a 5,463-foot (1,665 m) airfield on the island. This airfield served as a crucial staging base for the Seventh Air Force, allowing B-24 Liberator bombers to launch attacks on Japanese positions, including Mili Atoll in the Marshall Islands. Additionally, the 45th Fighter Squadron operated P-40 fighters from Baker Island's airfield from September 1 to November 27, 1943. However, the strategic importance of the airfield diminished quickly, and by January 1, 1944, it was abandoned as military operations shifted further west.

== LORAN Station Baker ==
The LORAN (Long Range Navigation) radio station on Baker operated from September 1944 until July 1946. This station, designated as Unit 91 with the radio call sign NRN-1, was a critical navigation aid for U.S. military operations in the Pacific during and immediately after World War II. LORAN stations like the one on Baker Island were part of a network used to assist ships and aircraft in determining their positions accurately, particularly in the vast and often featureless expanse of the Pacific Ocean.

== Flora and fauna ==
Baker Island is devoid of natural fresh water sources and receives minimal rainfall, making it an arid and inhospitable environment. The island, over 3700 feet wide, is remote and uninhabited despite its historical significance. It is designated as a wildlife refuge and is characterized by sparse vegetation, including four types of grass, prostrate vines, and low-growing shrubs. The treeless landscape provides a crucial habitat for various seabirds, waders, and marine wildlife.

Baker Island has been recognized as an Important Bird Area (IBA) by BirdLife International due to its support for large breeding colonies of seabirds, such as lesser frigatebirds, masked boobies and sooty terns. The island is home to over one million seabirds, including significant populations of albatrosses. Migratory waders, including ruddy turnstones, bar-tailed godwits, sanderlings, and Pacific golden plovers, visit the island seasonally. Additionally, endangered species like green turtles and hawksbill turtles, as well as gray reef sharks, spinner dolphins, monk seals, and hermit crabs, can be found along the surrounding reef.

== National Wildlife Refuge ==
On June 27, 1974, Secretary of the Interior Rogers Morton established the Baker Island National Wildlife Refuge. In 2009, the refuge was expanded to include submerged lands extending 12 nautical miles (22 km) from the island's shoreline. The refuge now encompasses 531 acres (215 hectares) of land and 410,184 acres (165,996 hectares) of surrounding marine waters. Baker Island, along with six other islands, is managed by the U.S. Fish and Wildlife Service as part of the Pacific Remote Islands National Wildlife Refuge Complex. In January 2009, this entity was redesignated as the Pacific Remote Islands Marine National Monument by President George W. Bush. This was renamed Pacific Islands Heritage Marine National Monument in 2025.

Environmental challenges facing the refuge include remnants of abandoned military debris from World War II and the threat of illegal fishing in offshore waters. Additionally, invasive species introduced by human activity, such as cockroaches and coconut palms, have displaced native wildlife. Feral cats, which were first introduced to the island in 1937, were eradicated by 1965.

Public access to Baker Island is highly restricted and requires a special use permit issued by the U.S. Fish and Wildlife Service. Permits are typically granted only to scientists and educators. Although limited tour packages are available from early June to mid-August, unauthorized visits and activities such as swimming, fishing, and lighting fires are strictly prohibited. The atoll is only visited during daylight hours, and scuba diving is restricted to scientists affiliated with the U.S. Fish and Wildlife Service. Agency representatives visit the island approximately once every two years, often coordinating transportation with a National Oceanic and Atmospheric Administration vessel.

== Human debris and remnants ==
Debris from past human activity, particularly from the U.S. military's occupation of Baker Island during World War II, is scattered across the island and in the surrounding offshore waters. The most prominent remnant is the 5,400-by-150-foot (1,646-by-46-meter) airstrip, which is now completely overgrown with vegetation and is unusable. On the western coast of the island, a day beacon remains from the wartime era, although it has not been maintained since World War II. This beacon is now primarily used by albatross birds and hermit crabs for breeding, and it also serves as a landmark for the U.S. Fish and Wildlife Service during their infrequent visits to the atoll.

In the northeast section of the island, which appears to have been the main camp area during the military occupation, the remains of several buildings and heavy equipment are still visible. Five wooden antenna poles, each approximately 40 feet (12 meters) tall, continue to stand. Additionally, debris from several crashed aircraft, along with large equipment such as bulldozers, can be found both on the island and underwater.

Numerous bulldozer excavations containing remnants of metal, fuel, and water drums are scattered throughout the north-central portion and along the island's northern edge. The U.S. Navy reported the loss of 11 landing craft in the surf during the wartime operations, contributing to the debris found in the waters surrounding the island.

== Gallery ==
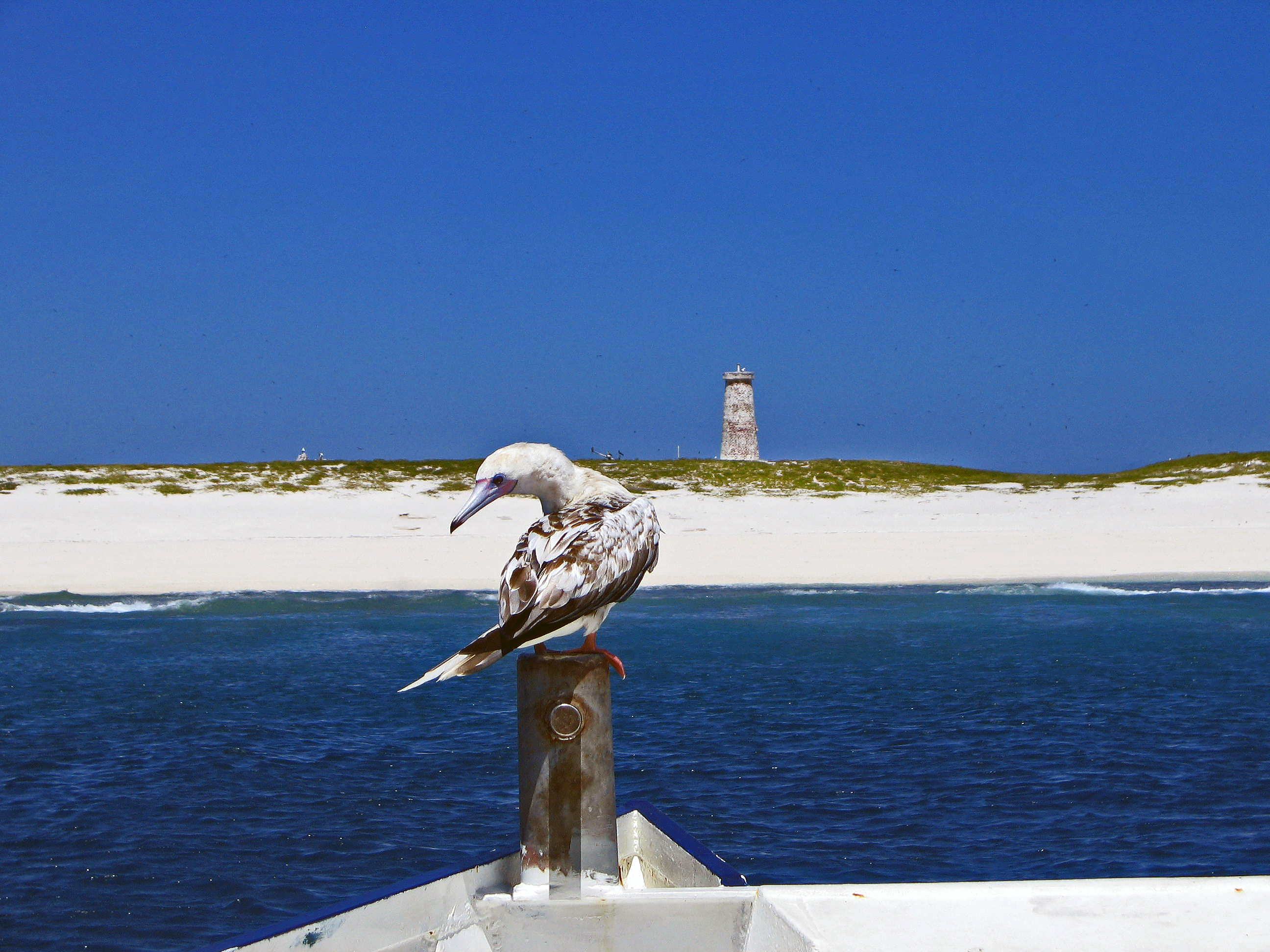
Baker Island coastline with red-footed booby

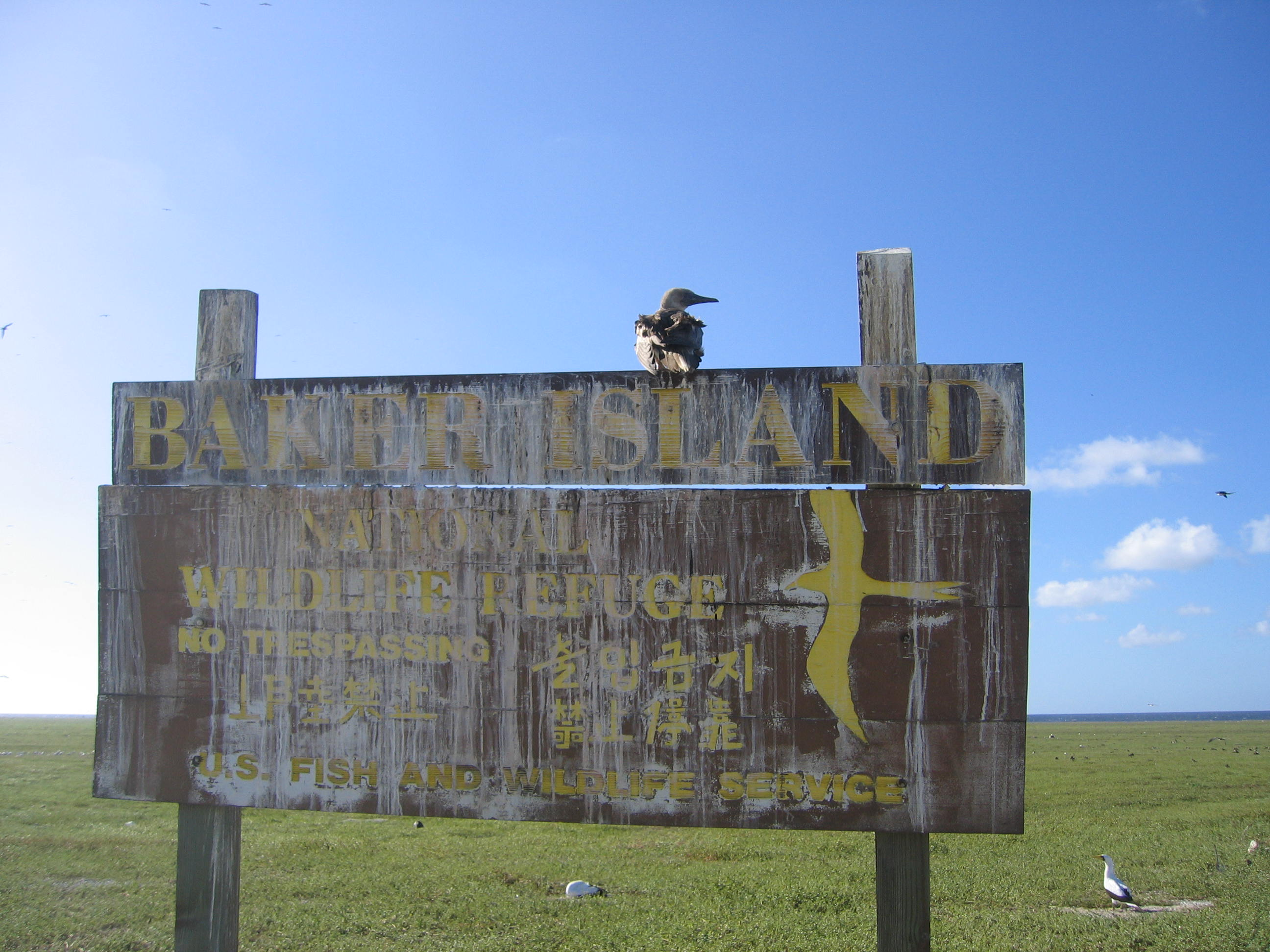
Fish and Wildlife sign

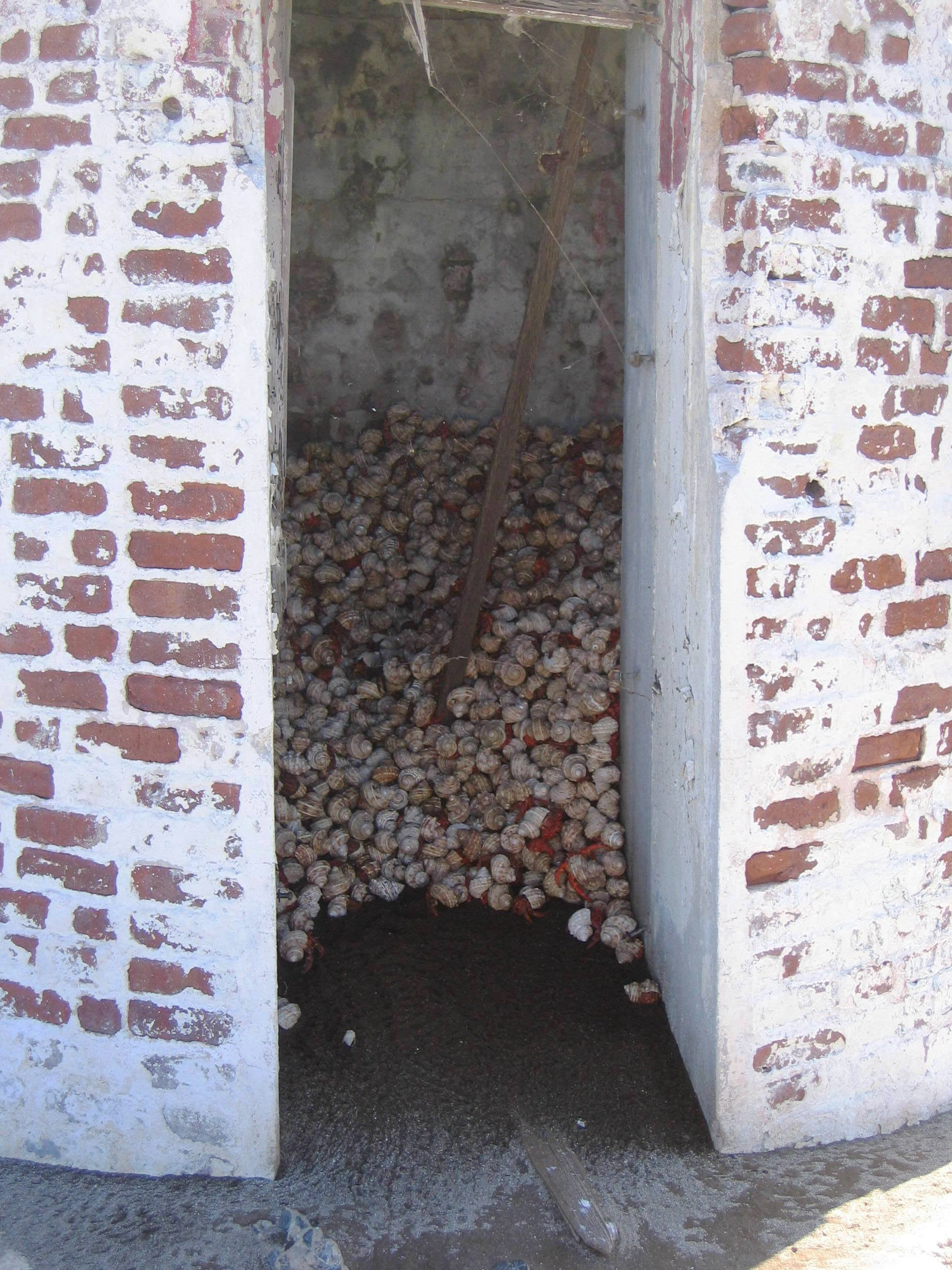
Hermit crabs taking shade in day beacon

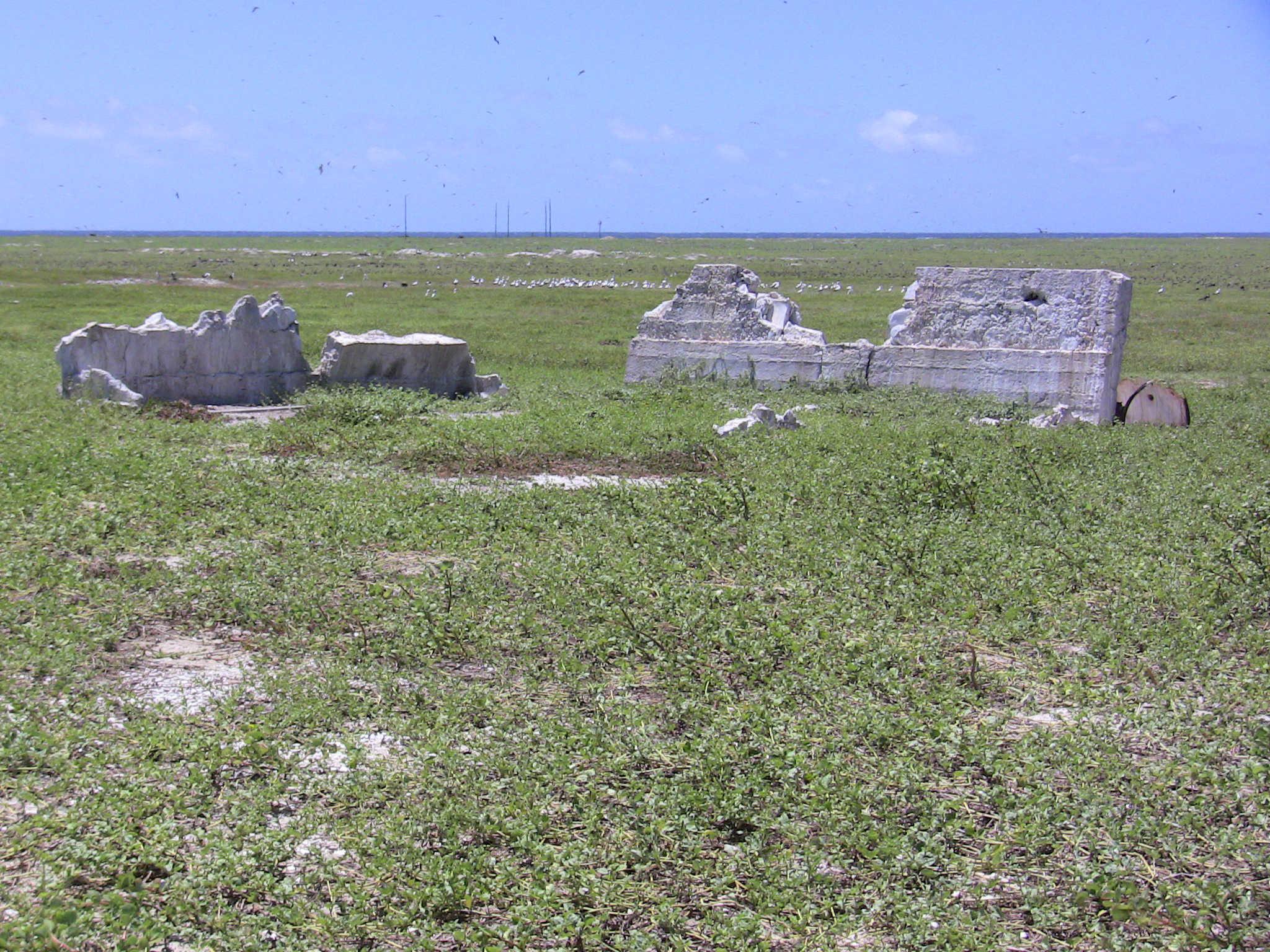
Settlement remains, radio mast in the background

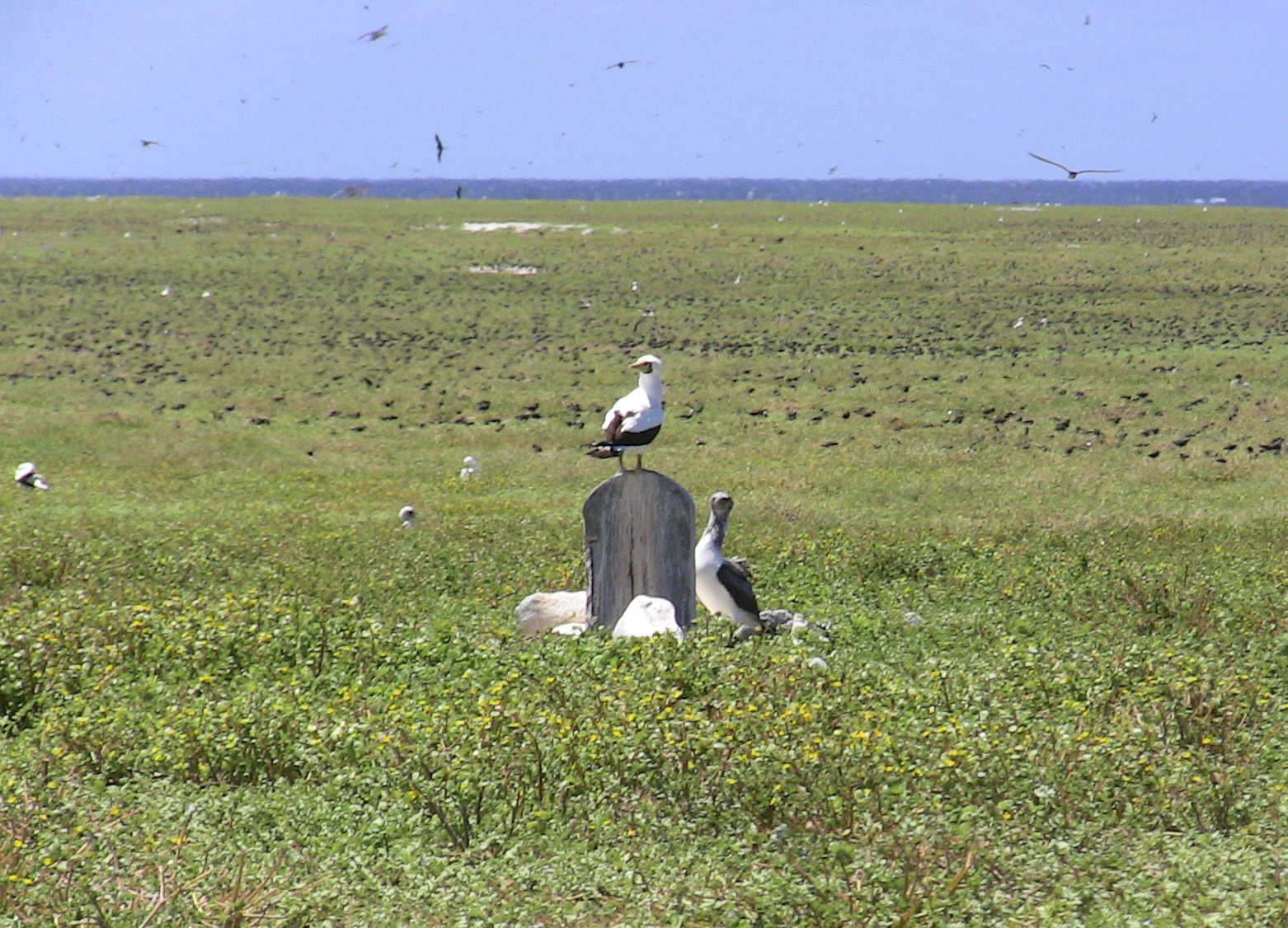
Masked booby on gravestone

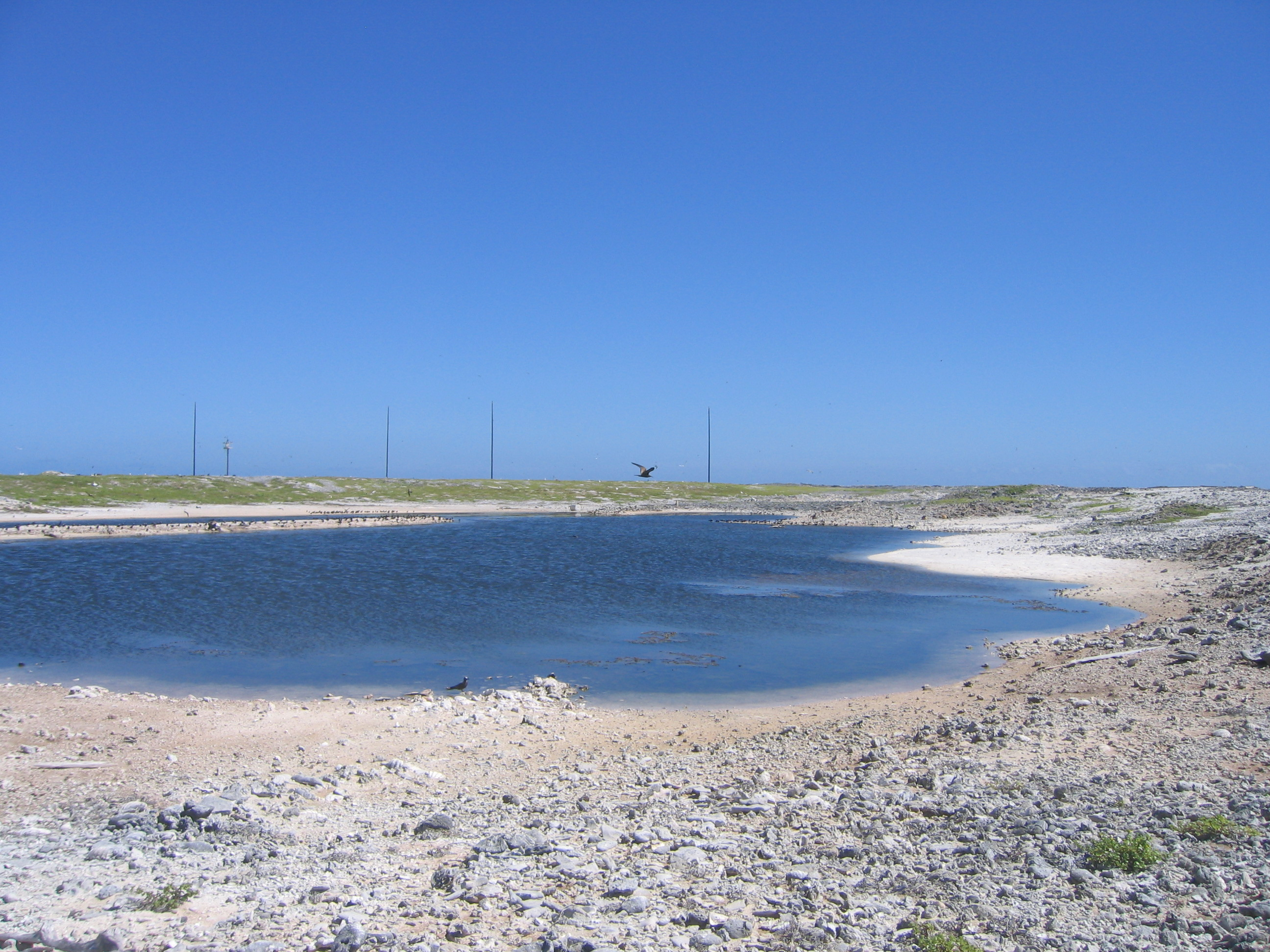
Brown noddies with radio masts in the background

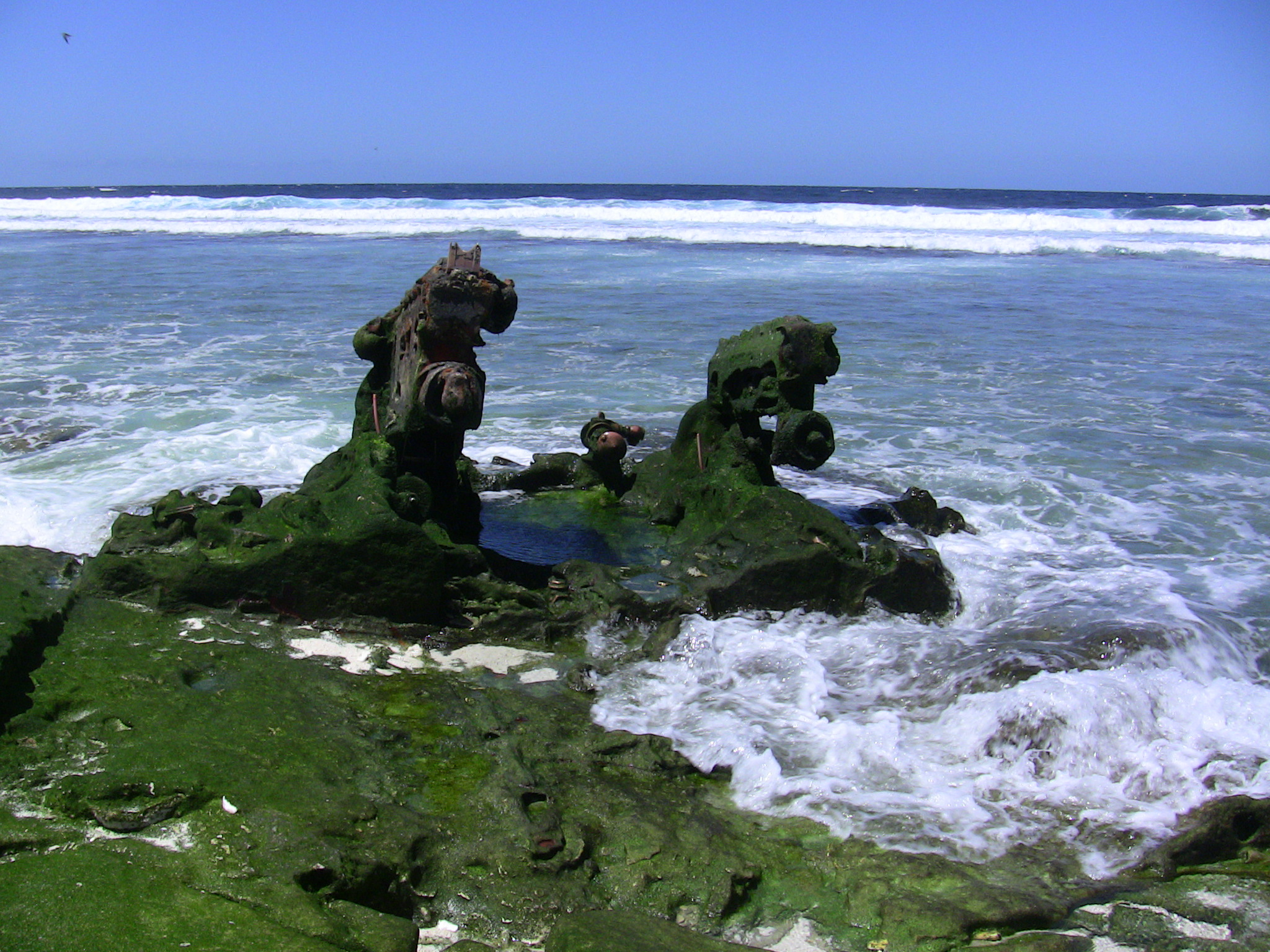
Landing craft wreckage on Baker Island coast

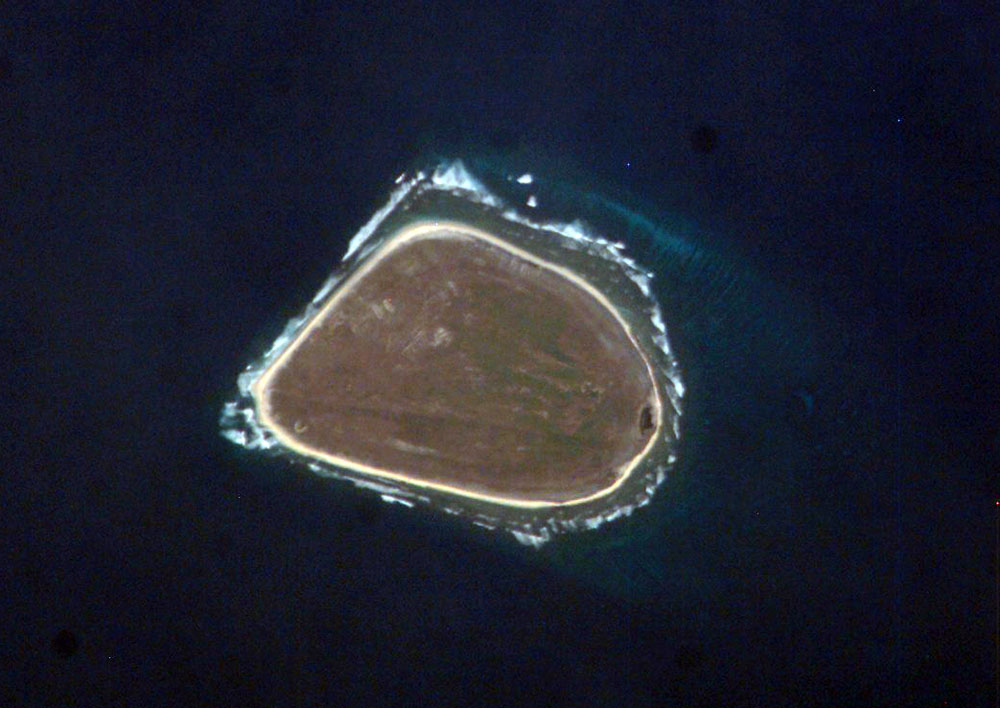
Baker Island satellite image

== See also ==
- 64th Coast Artillery (United States)
- History of the Pacific Islands
- Howland and Baker Islands, includes coverage of the Howland-Baker EEZ
- List of Guano Island claims
- List of islands of the United States
- List of lighthouses in the United States Minor Outlying Islands
- Canton and Enderbury Islands (U.S.- U.K condominium)
