= Pacific Islands Heritage Marine National Monument =

Group of unorganized United States Pacific Island territories

- IUCN category V (protected landscape/seascape)
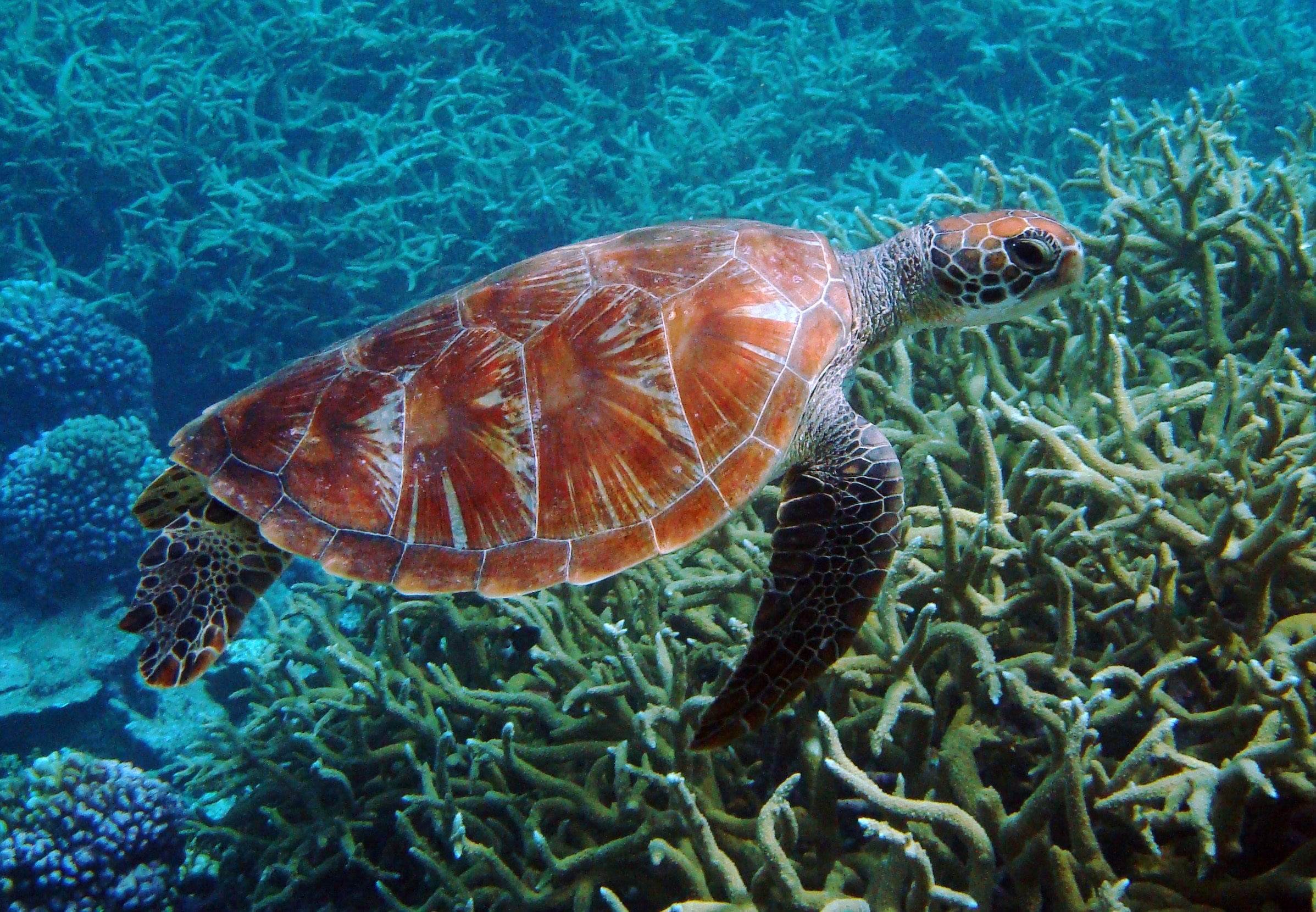
- Green sea turtle at Palmyra Atoll National Wildlife Refuge
- Interactive map of Pacific Islands Heritage Marine National Monument
- Location: Central Pacific Ocean
- Area: 313,818,892 acres (1,269,980.00 km^{2})
- Created: January 6, 2009
- Administrator: John Klavitter, Superintendent, U.S. Fish and Wildlife Service
- Website: Pacific Islands Heritage Marine National Monument

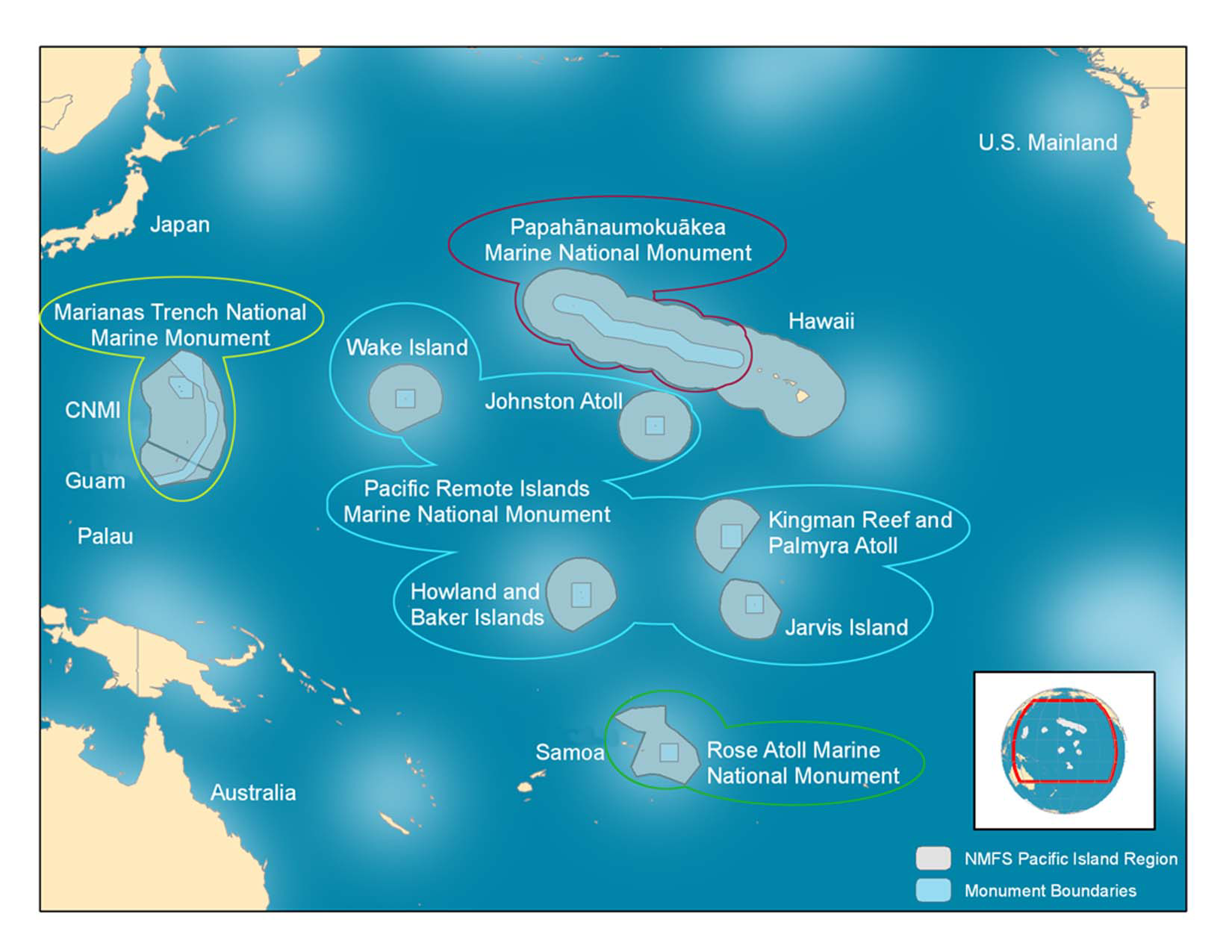
The previous (2011) boundaries of the Pacific Islands Heritage Marine National Monument are outlined in light blue.

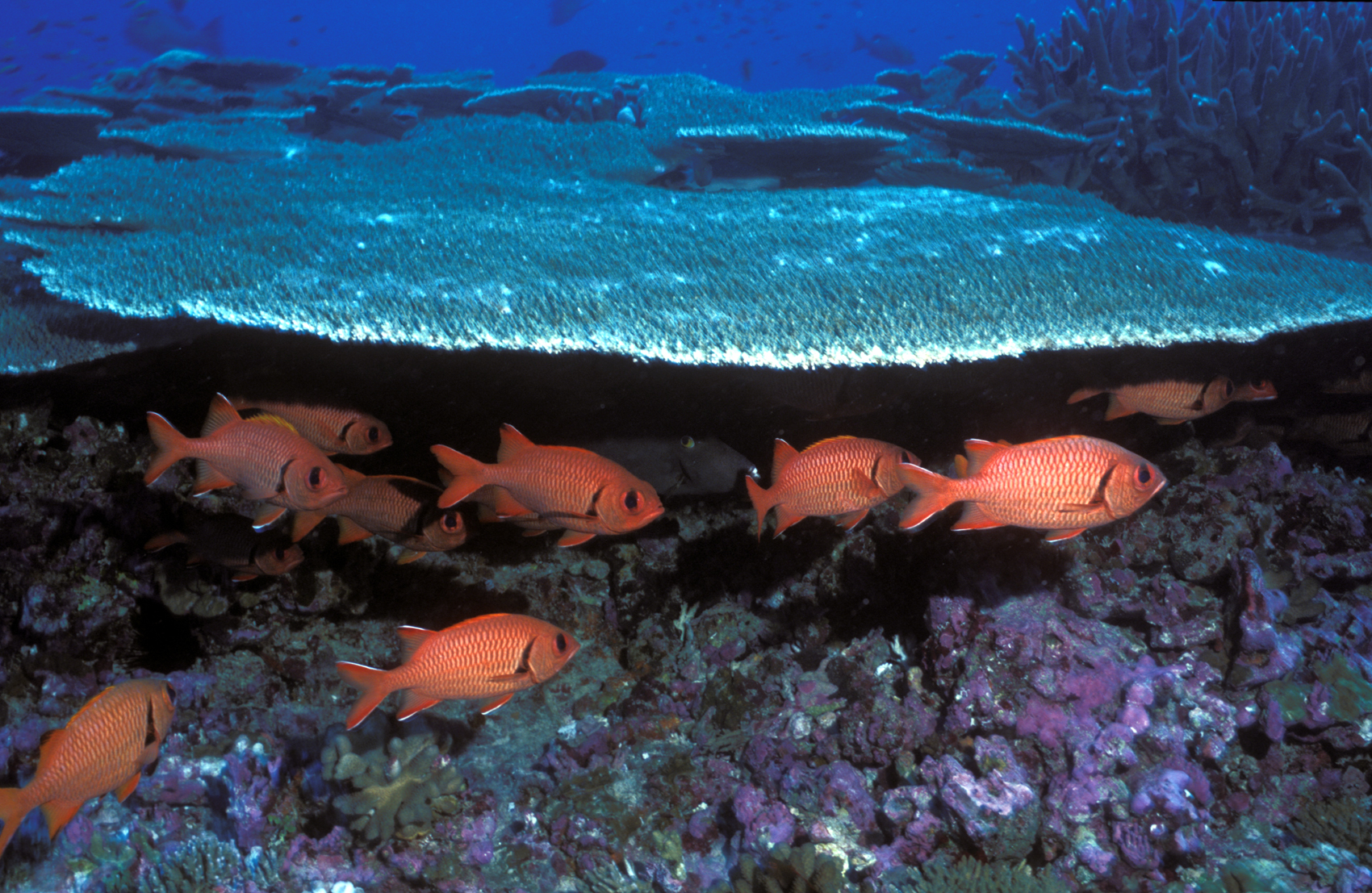
Soldierfish, Baker Island NWR

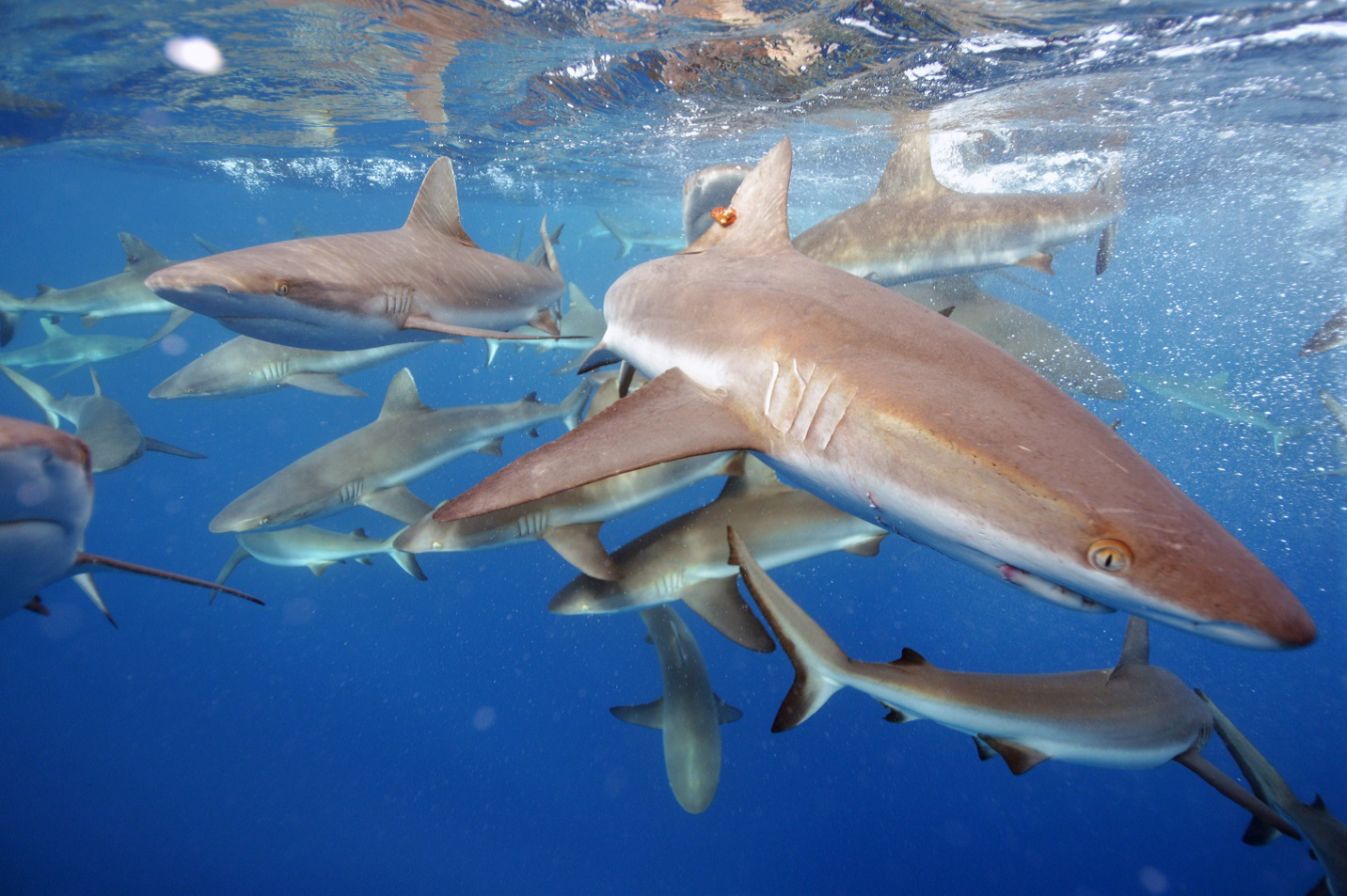
Grey reef sharks, Pacific Islands Heritage MNM

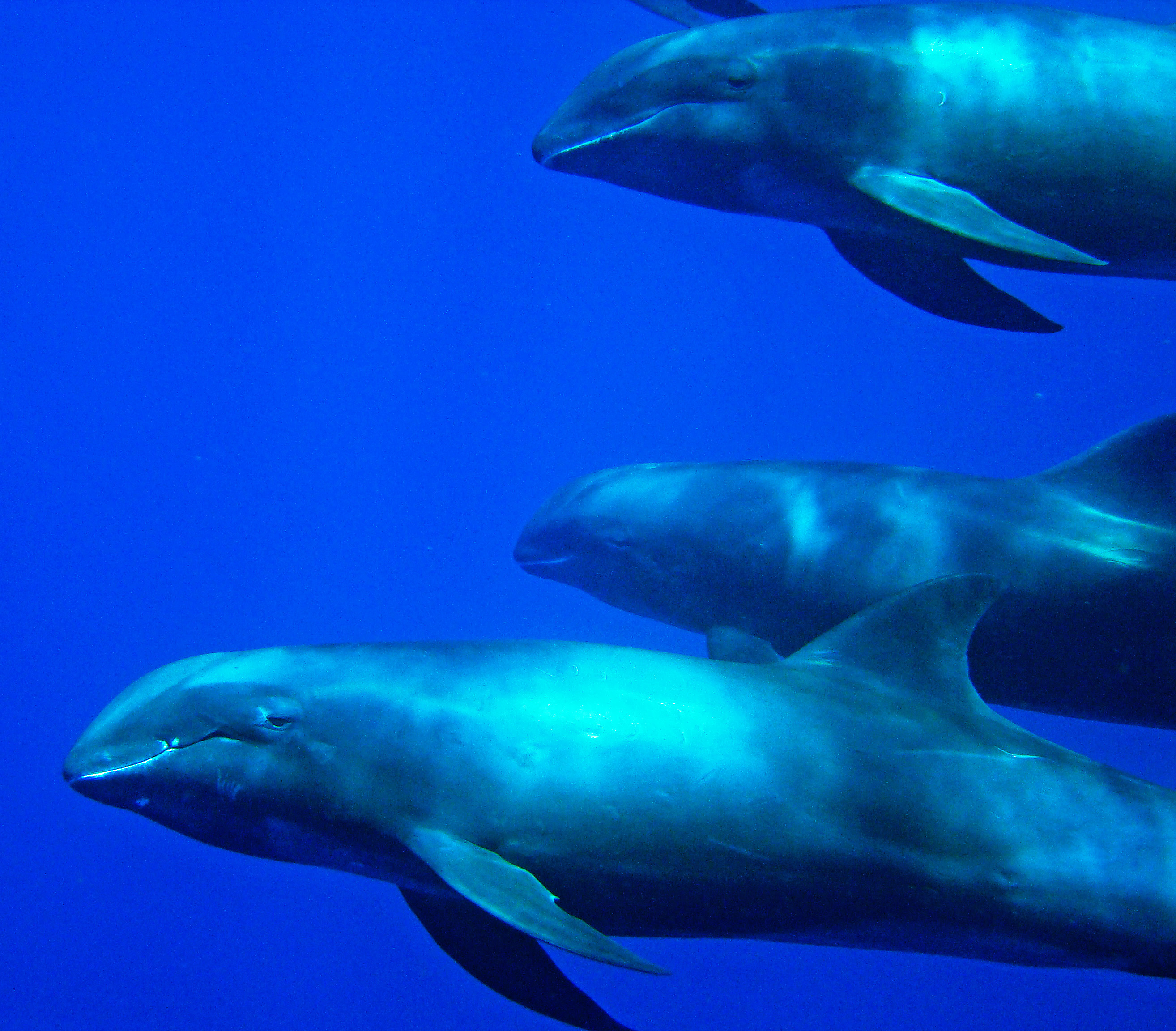
Melonhead whales

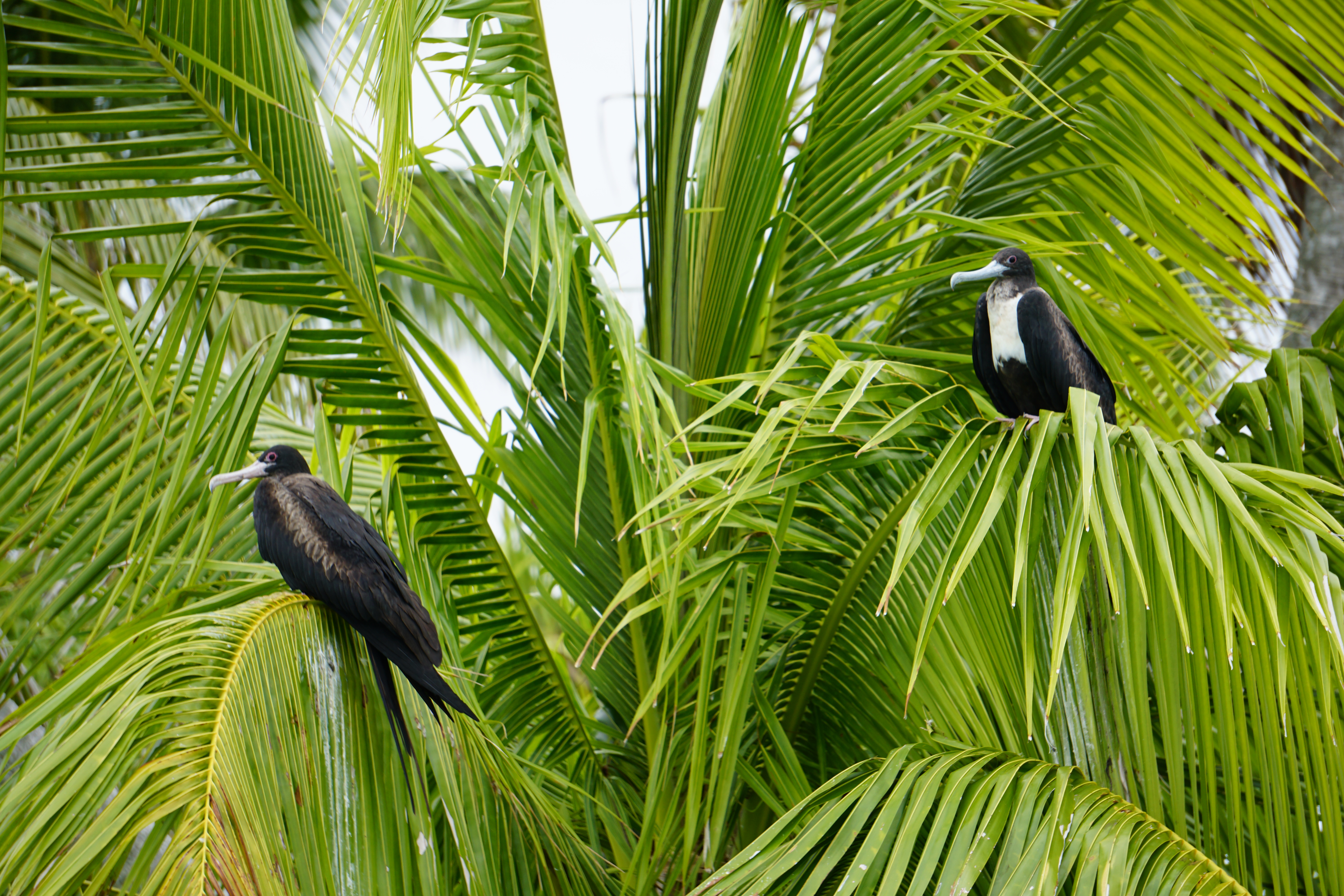
Seabirds on Palmyra Island flora

The Pacific Islands Heritage Marine National Monument, formerly named Pacific Remote Islands Marine National Monument, is a group of unorganized, mostly unincorporated United States Pacific Island territories managed by the United States Fish and Wildlife Service of the United States Department of the Interior and the National Oceanic and Atmospheric Administration (NOAA) of the United States Department of Commerce. These remote refuges are "the most widespread collection of marine- and terrestrial-life protected areas on the planet under a single country's jurisdiction". They protect many endemic species including corals, fish, shellfish, marine mammals, seabirds, water birds, land birds, insects, and vegetation not found elsewhere.

== History ==
The Pacific Remote Islands Marine National Monument was proclaimed a national monument on January 6, 2009, by U.S. president George W. Bush and follows his June 6, 2006, creation of the Papahānaumokuākea Marine National Monument in the Northwestern Hawaiian Islands. The original area was about 83,000 square miles (210,000 km^{2}). It was expanded on September 25, 2014, by U.S. president Barack Obama. The monument covers 490,343 square miles (1,269,980 km^{2}), spanning areas to the far south and west of Hawaii: Baker Island, Howland Island, Jarvis Island, Johnston Atoll, Kingman Reef, Palmyra Atoll, and Wake Island. At Baker Island, Howland Island, Jarvis Island, Kingman Reef, and Palmyra Atoll, the terrestrial areas, reefs, and waters out to 12 nautical miles (22 km; 14 mi) (radius) are part of the National Wildlife Refuge System. For Baker Island, Howland Island, Kingman Reef, and Palmyra Atoll, fishery-related activities seaward from the 12 nmi (22 km) refuge boundaries out to the 50 nmi (93 km) MNM boundary (about 100 nmi (190 km) square across) are managed by NOAA. For Jarvis Island, Johnston Atoll, and Wake Island, fishery-related activities seaward from the 12 nmi (22 km) refuge boundaries out to the 200 nmi (370 km) MNM boundary (U.S. exclusive economic zone waters) are managed by NOAA. The land areas at Wake and Johnston Atolls remain under the jurisdiction of the U.S. Air Force, but the waters from 0 to 12 nmi (22 km) are protected as units of the National Wildlife Refuge System. The monument is closed to commercial fishing and other resource extraction activities, such as deep sea mining.

The monument includes endemic trees, grasses, and birds adapted to life at the equator, the rare sea turtles and whales and Hawaiian monk seals that visit Johnston Atoll, and high-quality coral reefs. U.S. federal law prohibits resource destruction or extraction, waste dumping, and commercial fishing in the monument areas. Research, free passage, and recreation are allowed.

On June 17, 2014, U.S. president Barack Obama proposed using his executive powers to expand the marine protected area to 782,000 square miles (2,030,000 km^{2}). Sport fishing is exempt, and public comments were solicited. He then signed a proclamation on September 25, 2014, expanding the monument to six times its original size, resulting in 490,343 square miles (1,269,982 square kilometers) of protected area around these tropical islands and atolls in the south-central Pacific Ocean. Expanding the monument protected the deep coral reefs, seamounts, and marine ecosystems unique to this part of the world, which are also among the most vulnerable areas to the impacts of climate change and ocean acidification. Specifically, it expanded the boundaries to the 200 nautical-mile outer limits of the U.S. exclusive economic zone (EEZ) around Wake Island, Johnston Atoll, and Jarvis Island while leaving in place the 50 nautical-mile boundaries for Kingman Reef and Palmyra Atoll and Howland and Baker Islands created by the 2009 proclamation.

In September 2017, Trump administration U.S. interior secretary Ryan Zinke recommended that the U.S. government reduce the monument's boundaries by an unspecified amount. By the end of his term in office, in January 2021, former president Trump had not followed this recommendation.

In March 2023, President Biden directed the secretary of commerce to consider making the monument and additional areas within the U.S. EEZ a National Marine Sanctuary, as well as to study a renaming of the monument, its islands, and their related national wildlife refuges. Following a collaborate process with Pacific Island communities and report published in March 2024, Biden renamed the monument as Pacific Islands Heritage Marine National Monument on January 2, 2025, to recognize traditional voyages and cultural connections in the region.

On April 17, 2025, President Donald Trump signed an executive order removing protected status from areas of the national monument. The executive order restored commercial fishing access from 50 to 200 nautical miles (the limit of the U.S. EEZ) from the land. Previously the area had been the largest marine protected area in the world.

== Geography ==
=== Location and area ===
The following islands form the basis of the Pacific Islands Heritage Marine National Monument:

- Baker Island, an atoll in the North Pacific Ocean 1,830 nautical miles (3,390 kilometres) southwest of Honolulu, coordinates 0°13′N 176°31′W, about halfway between Hawaii and Australia. The atoll has a total area of 129 km^{2}, of which 2.1 km^{2} is land and 127 km^{2} is water.
- Howland Island, an island in the North Pacific Ocean 1,815 nmi (3,361 km) southwest of Honolulu, coordinates 0°48′N 176°38′W, about halfway between Hawaii and Australia. The island has a total area of 139 km^{2}, of which 2.6 km^{2} is land and 136 km^{2} is water.
- Jarvis Island, an island in the South Pacific Ocean 1,305 nmi (2,417 km) south of Honolulu, coordinates 0°23′S 160°01′W, about halfway between Hawaii and the Cook Islands. The island has a total area of 152 km^{2}, of which 5 km^{2} is land and 147 km^{2} is water.
- Johnston Atoll, an atoll in the North Pacific Ocean 717 nmi (1,328 km) southwest of Honolulu, coordinates 16°45′N 169°31′W, about one-third of the way from Hawaii to the Marshall Islands. The atoll has a total area of 276.6 km^{2}, of which 2.6 km^{2} is land and 274 km^{2} is water.
- Kingman Reef, a reef in the North Pacific Ocean 930 nmi (1,720 km) south of Honolulu, coordinates 6°23′N 162°25′W, about halfway between Hawaii and American Samoa. The reef has a total area of 1,958.01 km^{2}, of which 0.01 km^{2} is land and 1,958 km^{2} is water.
- Palmyra Atoll, an atoll in the North Pacific Ocean 960 nmi (1,780 km) south of Honolulu, coordinates 5°53′N 162°05′W, about halfway between Hawaii and American Samoa. The atoll has a total area of 1,949 km^{2}, of which 3.9 km^{2} is land and 1,946 km^{2} is water.
- Wake Island, an atoll in the North Pacific Ocean 2,298 mi (3,698 km) west of Honolulu, coordinates 19°17′N 166°37′E, about two-thirds of the way from Honolulu to Guam. The atoll has a total area of 13.86 km^{2}, of which 7.38 km^{2} is land and 6.48 km^{2} is water.

South of the monument is the Phoenix Islands Protected Area, with a size of 408,250 km^{2} (157,630 sq mi), which was created by the government of Kiribati.

=== Climate ===
Because the islands are scattered throughout the ocean, the climate is different on each island. Baker, Howland, and Jarvis Islands have an equatorial climate, with scant rainfall, constant wind, and burning sun. Johnston Atoll and Kingman Reef have a tropical climate but are generally dry, with consistent northeast trade winds with little seasonal temperature variation. Palmyra Atoll has a hot, equatorial climate. Because the atoll is located within the low-pressure area of the Intertropical Convergence Zone where the northeast and southeast trade winds meet, it is extremely wet with between 4,000–5,000 mm (160–200 in) of rainfall each year.

=== Effects of climate change ===
A recent study in the journal Climatic Change suggests the expanded reserve could make pelagic fish populations in the Pacific more resilient to ocean warming. Researchers found that by 2060, warmer temperatures will attract skipjack tuna from the Western Pacific to the protected waters of the monument, away from areas that are heavily fished.

== Population ==
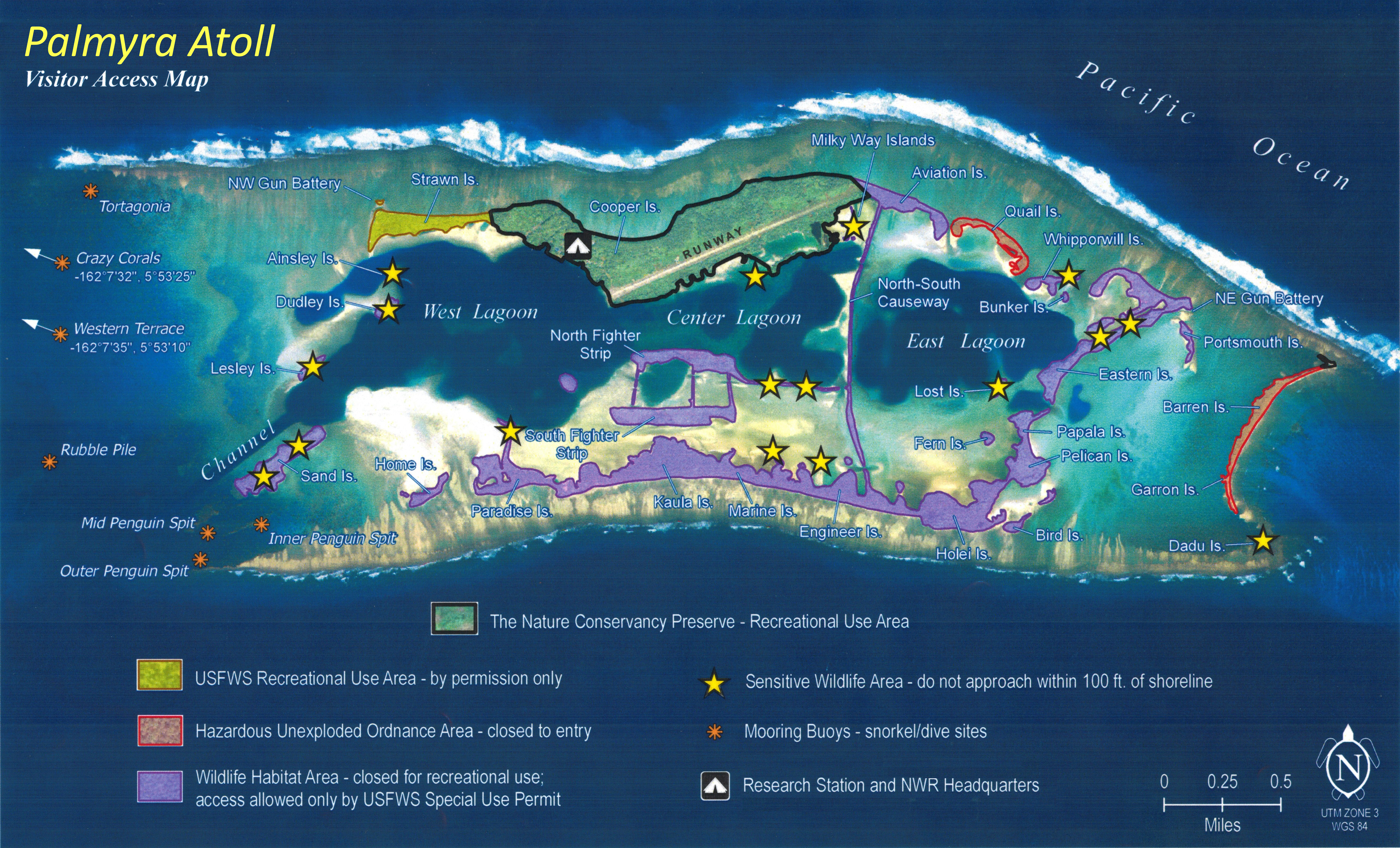
Visitor access map for Palmyra Atoll

Although the islands have no permanent residents, the seven islands that make up the marine national monument are stepping stones that connect Hawaii to Micronesia and other Polynesian sea voyaging cultures. The voyage from Hawaii to the neighboring Marshall Islands once included a stop at Johnston Atoll. Wake Atoll is geographically, culturally, and historically linked to the people who live in the Republic of the Marshall Islands. Kingman, Palmyra, Jarvis, Howland, and Baker are connected to the Republic of Kiribati. Voyaging and culture link all of these islands.

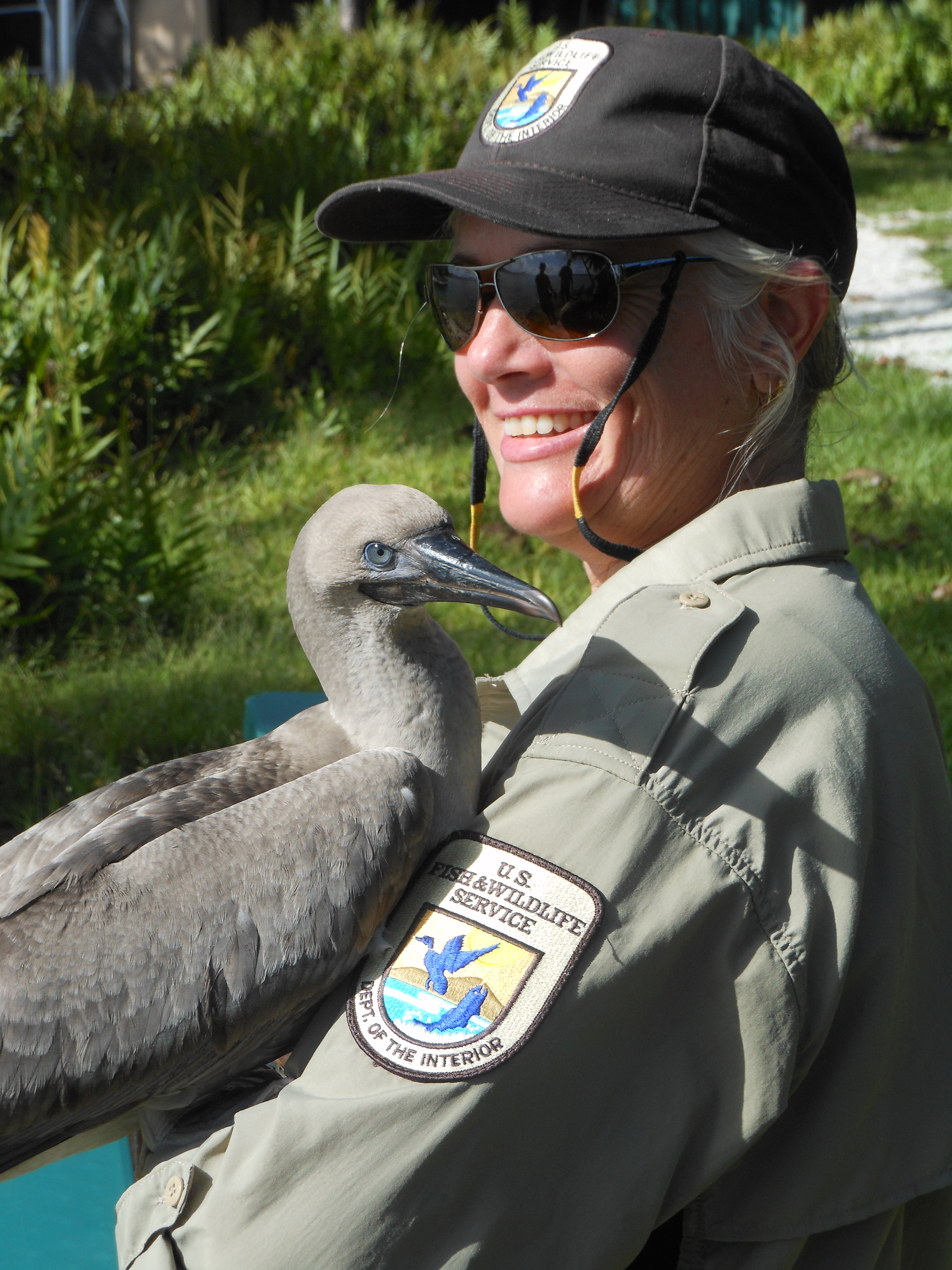
Susan White, Operations Superintendent, holding a young red-footed booby, 2014

Wake has a current transient population of ca. 125 military personnel and contractors. Johnston Atoll had a peak population of 1,100 military and civilian contractor personnel in 2000, but it was evacuated by 2007. From 2010 through 2021, volunteer biologists lived and worked on the island in groups of 5, but since May 2021, the island has had no permanent inhabitants. Four to twenty Nature Conservancy and U.S. Fish and Wildlife staff live at Palmyra Atoll. The four other islands are usually uninhabited.

Public entry to the islands is by special-use permit from the U.S. Fish and Wildlife Service. It is generally restricted to scientists and educators. Only Wake Island and Palmyra Atoll have serviceable runways; Jarvis, Johnston Atoll, Baker, and Howland Islands had airstrips in earlier times but they have long been abandoned and are no longer operational.

== See also ==
- List of national monuments of the United States
- Howland and Baker Islands, includes coverage of the Howland-Baker Islands EEZ
- Marianas Trench Marine National Monument
- Rose Atoll Marine National Monument
- United States Minor Outlying Islands, a political designation largely overlapping this ecological region
