= Howland and Baker Islands =

Unincorporated U.S. territory

Coordinates: 0°48′24″N 176°36′59″W

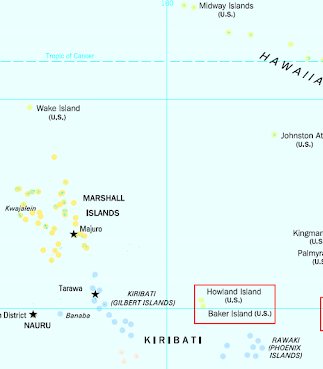
Location of the Howland and Baker Islands

Howland Island and Baker Island are two reserved U.S. coral islands in the Equatorial Pacific that are located close to one another. Both islands are strict wildlife refuges, the larger of which is Howland Island. They are both part of the larger political territory of the United States Minor Outlying Islands and they are also both part of the larger geographic grouping of the Phoenix Islands. Each is a National Wildlife Refuge managed by a division of Interior, the U.S. Fish and Wildlife Service. On January 6, 2009, U.S. President George W. Bush included both islands in the Pacific Islands Heritage Marine National Monument.

The Howland-Baker exclusive economic zone (EEZ) is a 400-nautical-mile-diameter (460 mi; 740 km) area protected by the U.S. Coast Guard. The area of the Howland-Baker EEZ is 425,700 km^{2} (164,400 sq mi); by comparison, the area of California is 423,970 km^{2} (163,700 sq mi).

Howland Island was the area that Amelia Earhart and Fred Noonan were trying to reach in 1937 when they disappeared. The islands are the only land masses in the world associated with UTC−12:00, which is the last area on Earth for deadlines with a date to pass.

== EEZ history ==
The 1976 Magnuson–Stevens Fishery Conservation and Management Act provided for the U.S. EEZs, which were further established by the Presidential Proclamation of 1983. The Treaty of Tarawa, signed in September 1979, came into force in September 1983, and created the international boundary of the EEZ between Baker Island and McKean Island. Article 4 specifically states, "The two Governments recognize the interest of their peoples in close cooperation for their mutual benefit in economic development relating to fisheries off their coasts." Since 2008, the Kiribati side of this boundary has been a marine protected area, the Phoenix Islands Protected Area.

== Land area and territorial claim ==
The islands combined are 855 acres (1.336 sq mi; 3.46 km^{2}) of strict nature reserve. Howland and Baker are separated by 37 nautical miles (43 mi; 69 km). Were Howland and Baker separate EEZs, the 200-nautical-mile (230 mi; 370 km) EEZ radius for either of the two islands would overlap with 80% of the EEZ for the other island. As a combined area, this EEZ is 4% of the total U.S. coastline (425,000 km^{2} out of 11,300,000 km^{2}), larger than that of South Korea or Cuba.

The Pacific Remote Islands Marine National Monument extends out 50 nautical miles (58 mi; 93 km) from each island.

As per the 2009 presidential proclamation, the National Wildlife Refuge extends out 12 nautical miles (14 mi; 22 km) from each island.

== Geologic setting ==
Howland and Baker islands are volcanoes approximately 120-75 million years old, on top of which coral has formed platforms. In the EEZ there are ten moderate-sized seamounts from the Cretaceous Period. Most of the seabed is more than 5,000 meters (16,000 ft) in depth, covered with abyssal sediment.

== Economic potential ==
The only immediate mining potential is on and immediately offshore of the islands themselves (phosphates, sand, gravel, and coral) which would conflict with their protected status per the study. Iron deposits on a few seamounts are also mentioned as an intermediate possibility but no energy resources are identified. The islands have phosphorite and guano resources. However, all commercial extraction activities, including fishing and deep-sea mining, are prohibited in the wildlife refuges and submerged lands and waters of the monument.

== Boundary with Kiribati ==
The islands are considered to be a part of the Phoenix Islands, the rest of which are in Kiribati. The Winslow Reef borders the Howland-Baker EEZ, but is in Kiribati. The PacIOOS mentions that Winslow Reef is "on the southeast boundary line of the EEZ". The EEZ boundary lies halfway between Baker Island and McKean Island.

Kiribati, as traced by the 1995 realignment of the International Date Line, arcs around Howland and Baker Islands as well as the US Possession Jarvis Island, from the west to the south and to the east. For example while the Winslow Reef in Kiribati is to the southeast of Howland and Baker Islands, the capital of Kiribati is on the Tarawa archipelago, and lies 625 nautical miles (719 mi; 1,158 km) to the west of Howland.

After the Pacific Leaders Forum met in August 2009, Kiribati invited the U.S. to add Howland and Baker to its Phoenix Islands Protected Area to create its Phoenix Ocean Arc concept. In November 2014, U.S. Secretary of the Interior Sally Jewell joined Republic of Kiribati President Anote Tong to sign a Cooperative Arrangement to coordinate and jointly support research and conservation activities for nearly 490,000 square nautical miles (650,000 sq mi; 1,700,000 km^{2}) in the Pacific Remote Islands Marine National Monument (Monument) in the United States and the Phoenix Islands Protected Area (PIPA) in Kiribati.

== Boundary enforcement ==
In 2005, the U.S. Coast Guard seized a $3,000,000 purse seiner two miles (3.2 km) from the Howland-Baker EEZ border with Kiribati, and a year later the case went to the federal District Court of Guam. The jurisdiction in Guam is provided by the 1976 Magnuson–Stevens Fishery Conservation and Management Act.

== At the corner of the world ==
Based on nautical time, the Howland and Baker islands are the last part of the U.S. to bring in the New Year, being the only territory of the U.S. in UTC−12. They are 24 hours behind the Wake Island Time Zone.

The area is also in the equatorial band above which satellites can remain in geosynchronous Earth orbit, and NSS-9 is above. In 1964, Syncom 3 was positioned on the International Date Line at the equator, a point 210 nautical miles (240 mi; 390 km) from Howland, and 22,236 miles (35,785 km) into space. Syncom 3 was the first geostationary satellite, and was used to convey live TV coverage of the 1964 Tokyo Summer Olympics.

== PTWC warning point ==
The Pacific Tsunami Warning Center issues tsunami warnings for "Howland-Baker", with the name of the "Warning Point" as "HOWLAND_IS.".

== Under a Jarvis Moon ==
The colonization of Jarvis, Howland, and Baker islands by a few Hawaiians and military personnel in 1935 was followed a year later by the claim of possession by Franklin D. Roosevelt in May 1936. Canton Island and Enderbury Island, now a part of Kiribati, were colonized in March 1938.

An 88-minute documentary, Under a Jarvis Moon (2010) captures the story of the 130 Americans who colonized these islands between March 1935 and February 1942. The settlers lived on the islands for three- to four-month shifts. This colonization was kept secret until Franklin Roosevelt claimed these islands as the territory of the United States in May 1936. It was these settlers who prepared the airstrip for Amelia Earhart.

The colonization came to an end on December 8, 1941, the day after the attack on Pearl Harbor. Howland and Baker were bombed, and two of the four colonists on Howland died. Although Wake Island was also bombed on December 8, Wake is west of the International Date Line, and the attack on Wake occurred only a few hours after the attack on Pearl Harbor. The last of the colonists on Jarvis, Howland, Baker, and Enderbury islands were removed in February 1942.

== See also ==
- Canton and Enderbury Islands, between 1939 and 1979, administration was jointly exercised by the U.S. and the United Kingdom
- Line Islands
- Office of Insular Affairs
- .um, short-lived TLD for the United States Minor Outlying Islands

=== Other combined EEZ ===
- Bassas/Europa
- Hawaii/Midway
- Kingman/Palmyra
