= Anywhere on Earth =

Calendar designation

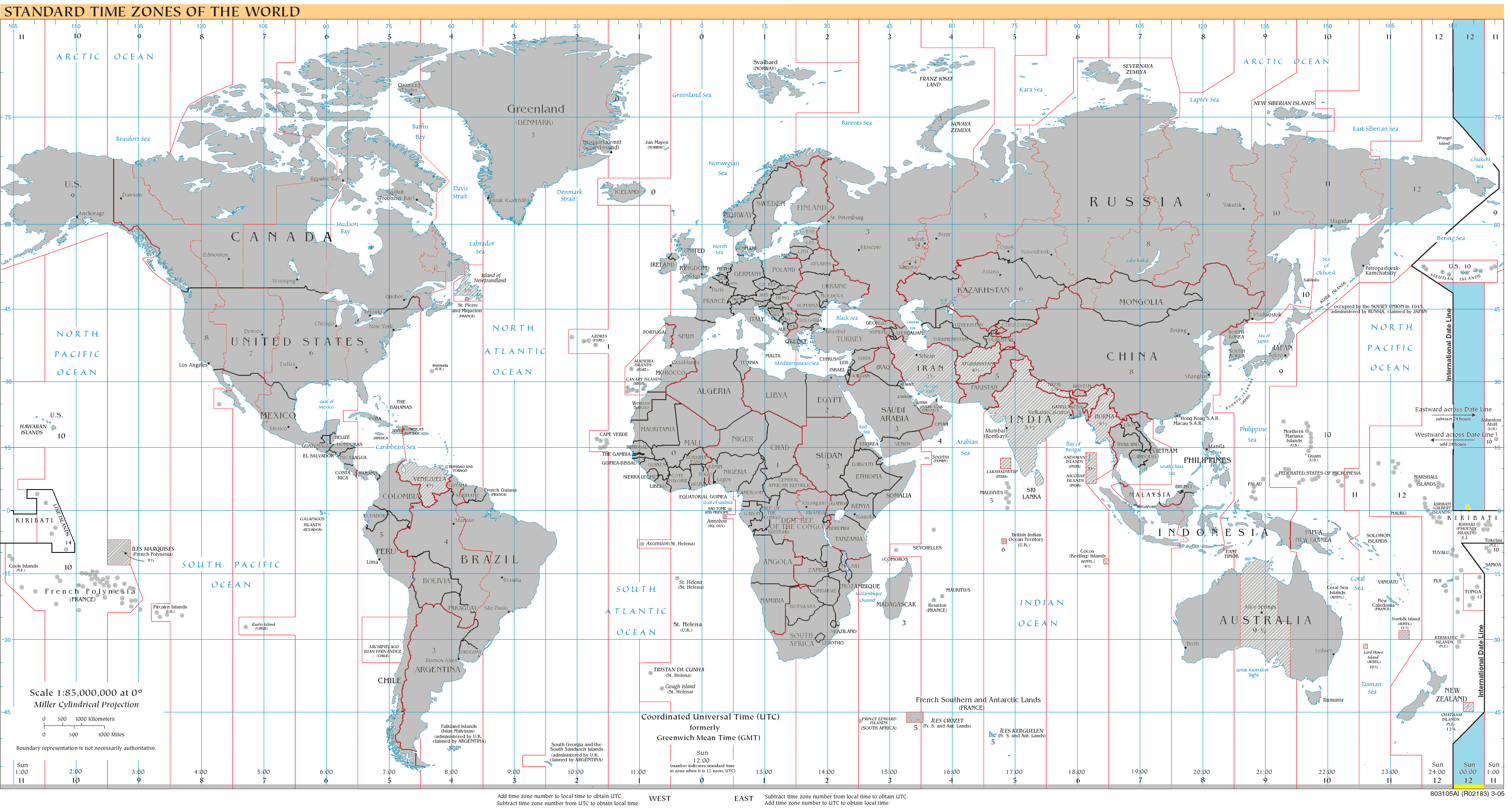
World map of time zones, with the UTC−12 time zone highlighted.

Anywhere on Earth (AoE) is a calendar designation that indicates that a period expires when the date passes everywhere on Earth. It is a practice to help specify deadlines such as "May 5, 2026, End of Day, Anywhere on Earth (AoE)" without requiring time zone calculations or daylight saving time adjustments.

For any given date, the latest place on Earth where it would be valid is on Howland and Baker Islands, in the IDLW time zone (the Western Hemisphere side of the International Date Line). Therefore, the day ends AoE when it ends on Howland Island.

The convention originated in IEEE 802.16 balloting procedures. Many IEEE 802 ballot deadlines are established as the end of day using "AoE", for "Anywhere on Earth" as a designation. This means that the deadline has not passed if, anywhere on Earth, the deadline date has not yet passed.

The day's end AoE occurs at noon UTC of the following day, Howland and Baker Islands being halfway around the world from the prime meridian that is the base reference longitude for UTC. Thus, in standard notation this is:

UTC−12:00 (DST is not applicable)
