= UTC−12:00 =

Time zone

- Time zone
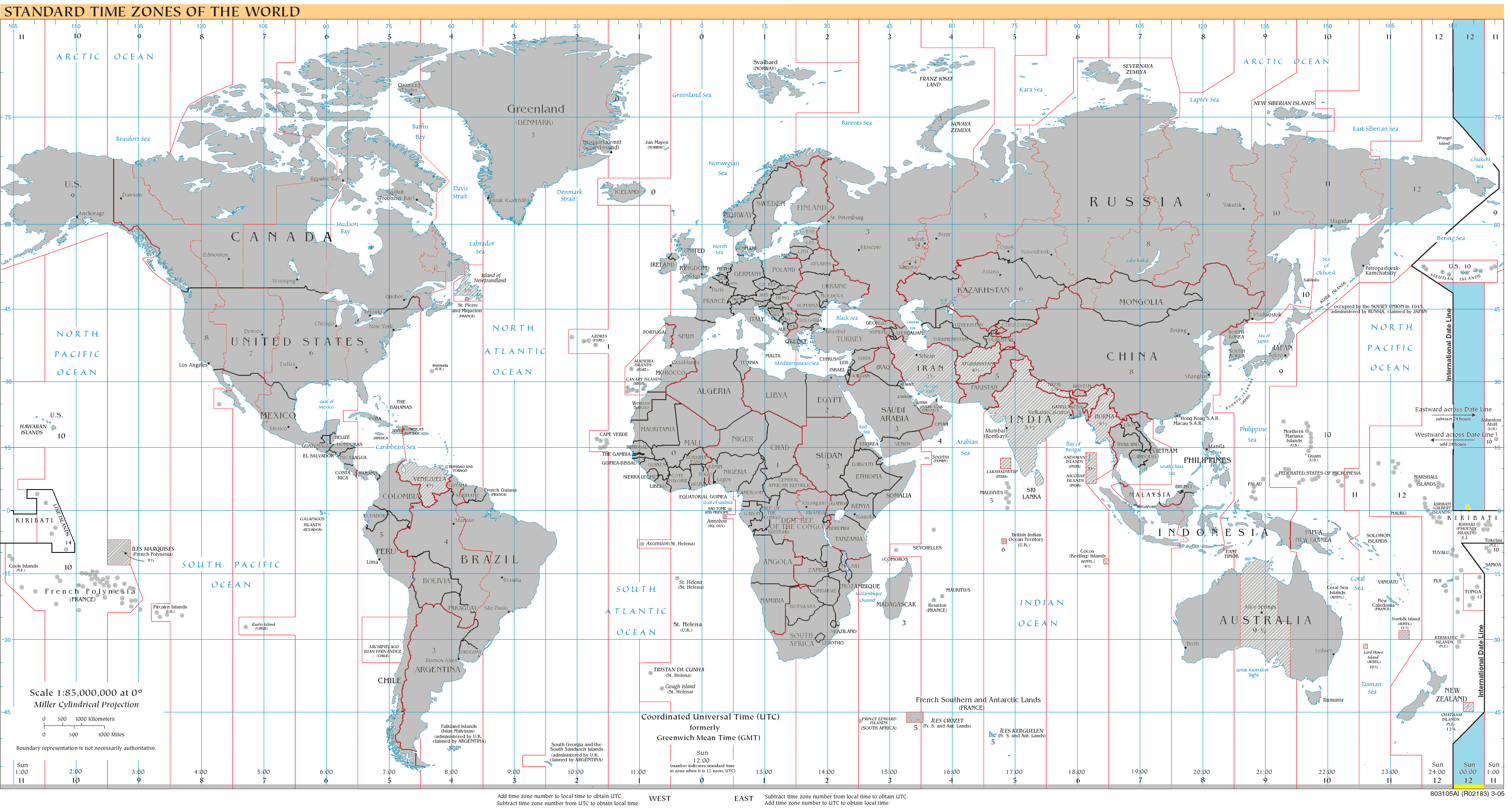
- World map with the time zone highlighted

UTC offset
- UTC: UTC−12:00

Current time
- 06:41, 22 September 2026 UTC−12:00 [refresh]

Central meridian
- 180 degrees

Date-time group
- Y

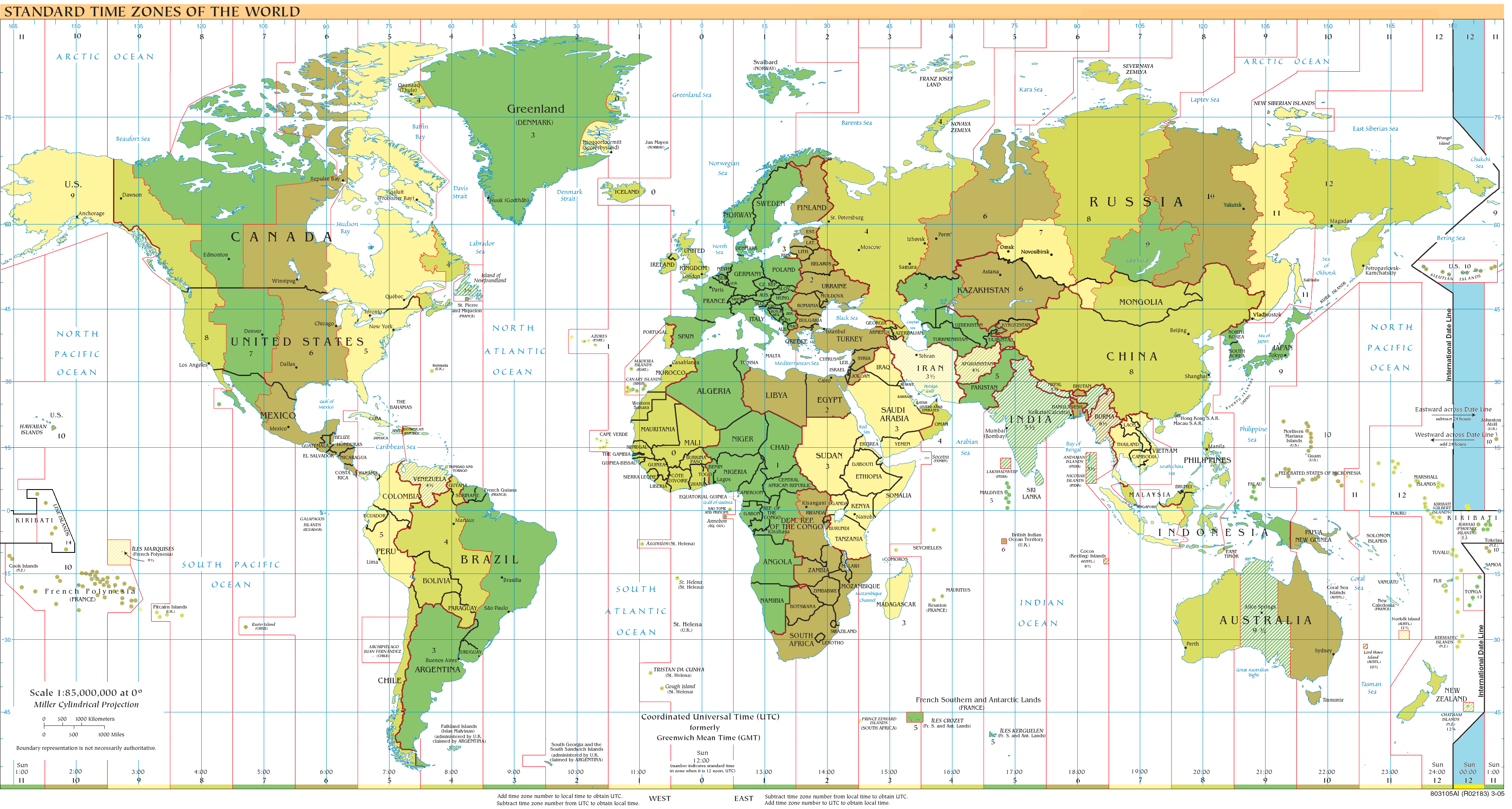
UTC−12:00: blue (December), orange (June), yellow (year-round), light blue (sea areas)

UTC−12:00 is an identifier for a time offset from UTC of −12:00. It is the last to enter a New Year, and is sometimes referred to as the International Date Line West (IDLW) time zone.

== Characteristics ==
UTC−12:00 is a nautical time zone comprising the high seas between 180° and 172°30′W longitude, and the time is obtained by subtracting twelve hours from Coordinated Universal Time (UTC). No inhabited territory lies within this time zone offset, either as standard time or daylight saving time; it only comprises the United States Minor Outlying Islands, specifically Baker Island and Howland Island (strict nature reserves belonging to the United States), as standard time. It is therefore also sometimes known as Baker Island Time (BIT).

A number of inhabited territories lie within the longitudinal limits of this time zone. These are Tonga, Wallis and Futuna and Chatham Islands as well as parts of Chukotka Autonomous Okrug of Russia, the US state of Alaska, Fiji, Tokelau, and Samoa. However, none of them keep the date and time of UTC−12:00. Instead, they keep the time and date (or just the date) of one of the neighboring zones, usually because they belong, politically, to a country which lies mostly in the neighboring time zone.

The International Date Line West (IDLW) time zone represents the last place on Earth a particular time and date exists, it is also referred to as Anywhere on Earth (AoE). A deadline specified as "Anywhere on Earth" has not passed if there is a place on Earth where the deadline has not passed, which is equivalent to the statement that the deadline has not passed in the UTC−12:00 zone.

== See also ==
- Greenwich Mean Time
- Howland and Baker Islands
- International Date Line
- UTC+12:00
- UTC+14:00
- Anywhere on Earth
