= List of countries by truck exports =

The following is a list of countries by truck exports, using the Harmonised System code 8704.

== International Trade Centre ==
Data is for 2024, in thousands of United States dollars and tons/units.

List of countries by truck exports (2024)
Country	Value exported (thousands USD)	Trade balance (thousands USD)	Quantity exported	
Country	Value exported (thousands USD)	Trade balance (thousands USD)	Value	Units
World	186,899,766	−9,863,070	–	–
Mexico	41,368,743	36,356,943	–	–
United States	21,175,935	−26,577,346	425,486	Units
China	13,892,390	13,258,557	3,390,841	Tons
Germany	12,171,362	4,095,515	962,934	Tons
France	9,486,884	2,803,701	971,138	Tons
Japan	8,800,605	8,417,689	501,378	Units
Thailand	8,645,159	8,362,013	–	–
Poland	7,919,426	5,453,179	832,961	Tons
Canada	7,726,085	−12,154,597	182,802	Units
Turkey	6,336,823	3,554,735	599,885	Tons
South Africa	5,503,574	4,670,474	181,131	Units
Italy	5,475,352	1,401,121	505,200	Tons
Spain	5,464,777	2,044,284	502,557	Tons
Belgium	3,746,809	−980,182	452,883	Tons
Netherlands	3,741,082	−537,424	709,799	Tons
Argentina	3,615,368	2,672,937	269,879	Tons
United Kingdom	3,340,275	−7,616,409	419,420	Tons
Brazil	2,522,196	−1,705,561	250,909	Tons
Sweden	2,214,141	632,179	179,212	Tons
Austria	2,175,499	885,611	142,229	Tons
South Korea	1,801,725	1,218,531	342,950	Tons
India	1,409,837	1,342,771	75,060	Units
Portugal	1,110,389	110,020	100,258	Tons
Finland	929,286	64,690	65,158	Tons
Romania	586,099	−388,996	60,507	Tons
Czech Republic	508,143	−615,623	64,957	Tons
Hungary	446,141	−889,114	–	–
Uruguay	423,707	−8,780	38,659	Tons
Morocco	413,541	−93,681	37,131	Tons
Norway	360,389	−1,409,105	66,117	Tons
Indonesia	354,515	−1,646,718	63,025	Tons
Switzerland	341,278	−1,678,904	62,645	Tons
Denmark	302,926	−966,074	80,071	Tons
Slovakia	300,355	−118,562	32,319	Tons
Kuwait	294,336	−318,627	36,092	Tons
Estonia	183,120	−71,464	25,721	Tons
Slovenia	156,159	−550,688	25,400	Tons
Australia	132,933	−10,366,563	–	–
Lithuania	125,177	−294,251	26,470	Tons
Saudi Arabia	109,662	−2,521,463	14,839	Tons
Kazakhstan	89,556	−392,905	6,782	Tons
Singapore	80,701	−130,559	18,348	Units
Ireland	80,557	−1,013,813	8,725	Tons
Bulgaria	75,707	−296,311	26,195	Tons
United Arab Emirates	66,635	−1,708,633	–	–
Colombia	61,932	−683,397	5,594	Tons
Serbia	60,866	−125,384	9,154	Tons
Luxembourg	52,002	−94,037	11,144	Tons
Croatia	45,527	−361,156	10,176	Tons
Zambia	41,877	−436,246	11,835	Tons
Latvia	41,815	−55,751	4,306	Tons
Chile	40,816	−2,720,071	4,924	Units
Tanzania	39,891	−302,708	12,334	Tons
Belarus	34,526	−20,673	3,904	Tons
Russia	32,646	−2,759,815	–	–
Côte d'Ivoire	30,501	−246,030	4,986	Tons
Uzbekistan	28,951	−429,683	3,601	Tons
Guatemala	23,880	−866,522	2,593	Tons
Kenya	22,313	−99,776	5,603	Tons
Israel	21,134	−807,889	2,276	Tons
Taiwan	20,291	−208,546	6,804	Tons
Uganda	18,322	−151,581	5,904	Tons
Namibia	18,124	−253,198	8,363	Tons
Burkina Faso	13,332	−47,482	2,253	Tons
Botswana	12,978	−136,940	3,077	Tons
New Zealand	12,206	−1,018,101	3,702	Tons
Moldova	11,479	−46,002	847	Tons
Senegal	10,979	−151,402	1,384	Tons
Peru	10,898	−1,522,715	2,452	Tons
Bosnia and Herzegovina	9,996	−131,010	2,797	Tons
Togo	9,322	−44,887	1,779	Tons
Vietnam	9,233	−748,377	–	–
Greece	9,156	−355,972	–	–
Armenia	9,081	−88,253	448	Tons
Hong Kong	8,988	−121,282	566	Units
Mali	8,877	−72,194	2,952	Tons
Panama	7,999	−72,395	747	Tons
New Caledonia	7,909	−25,338	–	–
Lesotho	7,879	−24,941	1,862	Tons
Cyprus	7,038	−86,071	476	Tons
Philippines	6,357	−2,271,463	1,034	Tons
Malaysia	5,528	−798,438	2,153	Units
Sri Lanka	5,465	−2,967	52	Units
Ghana	5,033	−333,059	–	–
El Salvador	4,786	−416,668	841	Tons
Ukraine	4,389	−981,745	1,354	Tons
Central African Republic	3,683	−19,899	444	Tons
Niger	2,884	−15,211	1,009	Tons
Cambodia	2,719	−118,987	170	Tons
Burundi	2,581	−13,631	2,334	Tons
Fiji	2,357	−63,583	–	–
Azerbaijan	2,280	−138,746	481	Tons
Trinidad and Tobago	2,210	−122,901	122	Tons
Iceland	2,084	−131,456	1,161	Tons
Montenegro	2,042	−56,682	442	Tons
Angola	1,940	−175,519	1,874	Tons
Egypt	1,829	−237,439	178	Tons
Iran	1,778	−7,705	–	–
Costa Rica	1,704	−394,290	464	Tons
Faroe Islands	1,558	−12,915	330	Tons
Grenada	1,464	−11,712	176	Tons
Mongolia	1,401	−720,355	207	Tons
Dominican Republic	1,391	−571,892	231	Tons
North Macedonia	1,379	−75,956	550	Tons
Kyrgyzstan	1,310	−147,887	573	Tons
Zimbabwe	1,268	−276,586	403	Tons
Barbados	1,237	−25,653	108	Tons
Bahamas	1,228	−25,866	8	Units
Nigeria	1,160	−278,225	715	Tons
Albania	1,104	−84,110	–	–
Malawi	935	−45,937	540	Tons
Suriname	922	−94,315	267	Tons
Gambia	880	377	460	Tons
Greenland	770	−5,076	132	Tons
Jamaica	721	−89,855	–	–
British Virgin Islands	691	−4,017	183	Tons
Guyana	643	−187,275	86	Tons
Cameroon	594	−67,350	802	Tons
North Korea	592	586	–	–
DR Congo	556	−414,502	544	Tons
Mauritania	537	−51,358	76	Tons
Honduras	460	−578,977	75	Tons
Gibraltar	400	−1,032	–	–
Saint Lucia	364	−9,778	93	Tons
Tunisia	362	−244,605	160	Tons
Mozambique	360	−241,808	–	–
Benin	327	−29,347	190	Tons
Tajikistan	318	−93,972	32	Tons
Pakistan	303	−165,141	8,392	Units
Jordan	270	−305,976	–	–
Andorra	250	−13,256	32	Tons
Curaçao	243	−19,188	34	Tons
Bangladesh	239	−106,132	–	–
Solomon Islands	225	−17,376	5	Units
Madagascar	208	−99,252	355	Tons
Antigua and Barbuda	204	−16,161	19	Tons
Ecuador	183	−468,795	38	Tons
Nepal	182	−23,166	–	–
Papua New Guinea	171	−144,094	1	Units
Sudan	153	−67,351	105	Tons
Nicaragua	134	−373,991	67	Tons
Afghanistan	132	−26,513	14	Tons
Mauritius	125	−93,466	9	Units
Belize	113	−28,508	39	Tons
Turkmenistan	103	−31,719	8	Tons
Djibouti	100	−215,781	20	Tons
Qatar	93	−168,879	–	–
Oman	88	−365,715	27	Tons
Algeria	83	−813,318	47	Tons
Georgia	81	−5,227	8	Tons
Guinea	66	−232,322	8	Tons
Congo	58	−37,633	4	Tons
Eswatini	56	−49,232	–	–
Sierra Leone	44	−42,073	10	Tons
Bolivia	42	−135,646	9	Tons
Laos	42	−279,002	8	Tons
Bhutan	40	−10,878	–	–
Venezuela	40	−60,008	–	–
Brunei	36	−1,936	1	Units
Malta	36	−38,133	41	Tons
Saint Kitts and Nevis	36	−2,239	2	Tons
Gabon	31	−74,263	11	Tons
Libya	30	−153,940	115	Tons
Dominica	29	−6,935	5	Tons
Guinea-Bissau	24	−3,517	16	Tons
Tuvalu	23	−808	1	Units
United States Minor Outlying Islands	22	−4,168	–	–
Saint Vincent and the Grenadines	21	−4,024	25	Tons
Turks and Caicos Islands	19	−8,128	–	–
Aruba	17	−10,212	15	Tons
Chad	16	−14,278	77	Tons
Equatorial Guinea	14	−7,837	8	Tons
Haiti	13	−9,812	3	Tons
Norfolk Island	12	12	–	–
Liberia	12	−35,767	13	Tons
Iraq	11	−540,088	8	Tons
Timor-Leste	10	−37,309	5	Tons
Eritrea	10	−6,200	2	Tons
Tonga	10	−6,004	1	Units
South Sudan	10	−12,733	–	–
Sint Maarten (Dutch part)	4	−4,746	2	Tons
Cook Islands	3	−1,937	2	Tons

== Observatory of Economic Complexity ==
Data is for 2023, in United States dollars.

List of countries by truck exports (2023)
Country	Trade value
Mexico	31,581,687,853
United States	22,806,715,152
Germany	13,867,164,621
Thailand	13,205,721,254
China	12,274,970,292
France	10,491,275,483
Japan	9,689,073,080
Spain	7,603,267,661
Canada	7,025,673,252
Italy	6,722,382,772
South Africa	6,718,686,360
Poland	6,123,670,022
Turkey	5,894,517,996
Argentina	4,641,439,625
Sweden	4,044,895,893
Netherlands	3,680,365,497
United Kingdom	3,645,804,136
Belgium	3,122,217,196
Brazil	2,572,143,145
India	1,804,627,558
Austria	1,570,502,679
Portugal	1,547,694,462
United Arab Emirates	1,475,179,683
South Korea	1,177,644,580
Finland	852,572,984
Morocco	728,424,739
Slovakia	552,832,065
Indonesia	546,736,167
Czech Republic	431,761,503
Norway	340,793,009
Hungary	291,551,566
Uruguay	286,752,348
Singapore	267,402,752
Slovenia	255,101,366
Switzerland	248,008,284
Denmark	219,905,346
Lithuania	174,061,634
Kuwait	167,037,215
Australia	165,986,728
Zambia	159,435,233
Estonia	133,222,173
Saudi Arabia	109,080,845
Oman	107,595,815
Romania	99,638,324
Chile	77,080,323
Ireland	73,513,882
Luxembourg	71,763,312
Colombia	71,128,858
Kazakhstan	70,394,006
Bahrain	63,176,207
Philippines	62,300,754
Russia	58,246,132
Bulgaria	56,965,744
Serbia	56,108,564
Latvia	40,378,233
Greece	37,974,478
Croatia	32,611,972
Kenya	27,815,825
Uzbekistan	27,776,056
Hong Kong	27,317,272
Burkina Faso	23,278,930
Israel	20,761,639
Guatemala	20,260,484
Taiwan	18,847,078
New Zealand	18,057,330
Armenia	17,447,619
Uganda	17,316,532
Namibia	17,158,389
Tanzania	14,985,189
Malaysia	12,561,728
Tunisia	12,236,048
Belarus	12,226,036
Cote d'Ivoire	8,832,166
Senegal	8,006,143
Sri Lanka	7,833,543
Qatar	7,830,213
Bosnia and Herzegovina	7,349,141
Botswana	7,173,098
Iceland	7,058,311
Peru	5,563,740
Ukraine	5,128,275
Dominican Republic	5,034,759
Benin	4,700,268
Ethiopia	4,678,482
Niger	4,218,643
Togo	4,108,856
Cyprus	3,908,902
Montenegro	3,513,792
Iran	3,387,882
Andorra	3,247,918
Azerbaijan	3,205,440
British Virgin Islands	3,058,542
Georgia	2,915,651
Eswatini	2,697,746
Ghana	2,673,152
Mozambique	2,547,120
North Macedonia	2,425,068
Egypt	2,383,874
Mauritius	2,349,913
El Salvador	2,200,083
Jordan	1,965,201
Saint Helena	1,936,924
Lesotho	1,912,632
Panama	1,899,990
Vietnam	1,780,541
Albania	1,657,870
Bolivia	1,201,754
Malta	1,140,209
Honduras	1,132,520
Malawi	1,051,832
Mali	1,031,265
Pakistan	1,005,210
Gabon	996,189
Ecuador	983,236
Costa Rica	896,366
Yemen	863,011
Fiji	741,267
Paraguay	734,491
Zimbabwe	681,891
Jamaica	629,701
Nicaragua	627,495
Nigeria	617,441
Kyrgyzstan	551,416
Sierra Leone	541,763
New Caledonia	539,436
Seychelles	522,764
Liberia	497,368
Gambia	469,526
Moldova	454,482
Gibraltar	441,958
Curacao	427,234
Mauritania	424,440
Barbados	422,078
Papua New Guinea	334,592
DR Congo	317,963
Belize	260,830
North Korea	255,038
Lebanon	241,973
Somalia	202,635
Algeria	199,340
Djibouti	172,569
Bahamas	171,124
Brunei	167,474
Afghanistan	147,000
Macau	141,657
Angola	132,054
Cameroon	119,807
Marshall Islands	113,386
Haiti	110,386
Myanmar	80,630
Madagascar	80,008
Iraq	76,111
Suriname	75,704
Saint Vincent and the Grenadines	75,198
Mongolia	73,139
Guinea-Bissau	63,693
Congo	60,255
Trinidad and Tobago	58,306
Tajikistan	52,927
Equatorial Guinea	44,439
Venezuela	41,114
South Sudan	39,000
Eritrea	34,219
Aruba	22,806
French Polynesia	19,068
Sudan	16,905
Libya	15,174
Antigua and Barbuda	12,587
Cayman Islands	12,193
Nepal	11,036
Cambodia	10,320
Central African Republic	10,046
Grenada	8,273
Saint Martin	7,163
Norfolk Island	6,000
Cuba	5,830
Dominica	5,830
Greenland	5,780
Rwanda	3,332
Guinea	2,638
San Marino	865
Burundi	549
