= List of countries by telephone exports =

The following is a list of countries by telephone exports, including mobile phones, using the Harmonised System code 8517.

== International Trade Centre ==
Data is for 2024, in thousands of United States dollars and tons.

List of countries by telephone exports (2024)
Country	Value exported (thousands USD)	Trade balance (thousands USD)	Quantity exported (tons)
World	624,029,061	−35,989,584	0
China	225,614,696	193,502,030	1,289,882
Vietnam	72,515,437	55,369,631	0
Hong Kong	59,859,870	−3,316,161	0
United States	39,887,456	−76,243,519	0
India	22,149,646	3,422,919	–
Netherlands	21,791,638	−2,989,600	89,748
Czech Republic	18,299,386	2,385,213	0
Mexico	15,148,635	−7,903,742	0
Singapore	15,092,390	325,768	0
Taiwan	14,043,504	5,838,020	72,448
South Korea	12,095,997	1,339,722	30,450
Germany	11,930,578	−14,149,642	42,736
Thailand	11,727,810	3,577,956	0
Malaysia	7,103,355	785,018	0
Saudi Arabia	6,622,482	−3,267,767	4,947
Italy	5,916,786	−5,423,372	27,806
United Kingdom	5,626,790	−14,705,126	15,533
Slovakia	5,175,034	−1,776,564	11,661
Austria	5,092,428	−1,737,896	7,720
Hungary	4,628,123	−806,982	0
Sweden	4,352,885	−1,761,502	0
Poland	3,881,898	−4,987,024	22,341
France	3,215,074	−9,600,443	25,364
Japan	2,649,279	−24,162,069	0
Belgium	2,614,738	−2,096,736	11,444
Israel	2,408,581	−879,335	6,981
Canada	2,088,539	−10,371,996	0
Indonesia	2,081,185	−4,794,900	21,780
Spain	1,886,268	−6,017,669	9,891
Ireland	1,507,208	−1,550,686	2,622
United Arab Emirates	1,467,571	−27,372,962	0
Australia	1,279,284	−7,171,132	0
Estonia	1,145,983	332,241	5,242
Romania	1,145,815	−1,584,478	6,577
Philippines	1,061,261	−1,365,482	11,366
Denmark	1,032,270	−1,507,460	3,797
Latvia	789,232	81,927	3,246
Lithuania	707,603	−384,148	1,618
Armenia	672,520	−155,036	1,162
Panama	664,572	−147,904	7,528
Switzerland	556,664	−2,823,468	1,930
Norway	513,845	−1,643,142	3,761
Finland	499,542	−1,211,475	1,330
Kazakhstan	439,655	−1,210,955	865
Laos	365,098	222,239	0
Portugal	344,840	−1,579,346	1,412
Greece	338,419	−1,121,243	963
Bulgaria	327,202	−720,726	844
Turkey	325,816	−4,623,480	3,574
Tunisia	295,047	−4,879	0
South Africa	294,712	−2,849,449	0
New Zealand	274,485	−1,027,916	1,076
Slovenia	266,271	−339,806	714
Brazil	241,666	−4,431,587	3,239
Kuwait	231,894	−1,480,768	668
Macao	169,420	−505,775	141
Chile	154,837	−2,154,006	0
Russia	142,378	−5,161,086	0
Croatia	138,568	−599,054	507
Kyrgyzstan	90,335	−156,781	985
Luxembourg	73,235	−234,061	370
Cyprus	71,811	−172,740	139
Dominican Republic	70,803	−248,860	839
Egypt	67,810	−1,860,138	0
Ukraine	65,071	−1,206,336	649
Serbia	63,626	−472,768	354
Cambodia	48,477	−80,178	892
Colombia	38,957	−2,393,204	1,528
Morocco	26,631	−571,120	0
Uzbekistan	25,651	−1,337,980	0
North Macedonia	20,787	−104,499	787
Qatar	18,684	−319,055	0
Guatemala	16,126	−1,052,666	187
Costa Rica	15,073	−641,179	253
Nigeria	14,916	−1,286,152	0
Pakistan	14,330	−2,169,977	0
Oman	12,148	−217,003	0
Peru	11,840	−1,713,446	233
Algeria	11,635	−690,283	0
Kenya	11,430	−264,277	535
Cayman Islands	11,127	−3,825	0
Malta	10,268	−76,538	24
Bahrain	9,411	−60,295	0
Iceland	9,238	−206,182	174
Jordan	8,992	−283,097	0
Argentina	8,711	−1,524,408	16
Mauritius	8,516	−149,076	0
Central African Republic	7,066	−7,223	6
British Virgin Islands	6,907	−1,962	0
Ecuador	6,759	−621,388	151
Tanzania	5,468	−202,504	28
El Salvador	5,251	−377,710	49
Paraguay	4,801	−1,503,023	202
Eswatini	4,702	−8,613	0
Ghana	4,690	−318,320	0
Lebanon	4,680	−62,901	0
Fiji	4,249	−89,392	0
Senegal	3,970	−126,600	64
Bosnia and Herzegovina	3,836	−154,114	29
Botswana	3,400	−90,559	33
Iraq	3,315	−408,761	0
Uruguay	3,263	−333,124	134
Bolivia	3,240	−103,847	26
Montenegro	3,072	−74,991	15
Azerbaijan	3,020	−624,571	19
Albania	2,936	−56,830	0
Georgia	2,696	−338,200	12
Côte d'Ivoire	2,657	−117,848	88
Montserrat	2,638	2,507	0
Greenland	2,592	−8,096	0
Iran	2,383	−35,706	0
Moldova	2,381	−176,526	18
Cameroon	2,344	−207,355	0
Namibia	2,292	−92,632	43
Ethiopia	2,278	−204,027	0
Zambia	2,243	−78,814	51
Bangladesh	2,178	−739,577	0
Belarus	2,166	−130,762	0
Madagascar	2,126	−46,221	99
Uganda	2,087	−169,928	339
Afghanistan	1,962	−54,614	0
Angola	1,843	−158,197	33
Nicaragua	1,837	−75,613	190
Sri Lanka	1,680	−242,048	0
Bahamas	1,564	−39,790	0
Nepal	1,440	−287,222	0
Yemen	1,412	−16,508	6
Guyana	1,398	−61,137	8
Samoa	1,353	−3,973	–
Barbados	1,254	−13,376	4
Mozambique	1,251	−76,163	0
North Korea	1,212	1,168	6
Benin	1,117	−44,240	642
United States Minor Outlying Islands	1,090	−14,675	0
Brunei	1,022	−29,094	0
Honduras	1,016	−278,403	24
Sierra Leone	998	−32,123	0
Mali	963	−254,239	0
Cuba	933	−77,980	4
Mongolia	852	−244,351	11
French Southern and Antarctic Territories	838	−1,021	20
Jamaica	770	−50,823	0
Rwanda	728	−121,832	0
Faroe Islands	633	−27,620	3
Venezuela	554	−390,690	0
Cook Islands	502	−1,417	0
Libya	477	−106,534	0
Togo	458	−26,386	46
Papua New Guinea	443	−93,093	0
New Caledonia	438	−20,776	0
Djibouti	360	−65,263	0
Turkmenistan	349	−148,552	0
Timor-Leste	339	−18,652	0
Micronesia	328	−3,025	0
Zimbabwe	317	−122,966	28
Trinidad and Tobago	304	−11,679	4
Andorra	279	−29,900	0
Haiti	253	−40,858	0
Burkina Faso	249	−32,461	23
Burundi	245	−13,033	3
Malawi	231	−44,076	7
Eritrea	214	−1,747	0
Curaçao	187	−42,901	0
Tokelau	178	169	0
DR Congo	175	−185,735	0
Chad	162	−41,524	0
French Polynesia	152	−32,891	1
Christmas Island	138	−150	0
Gibraltar	134	−8,216	0
Vanuatu	125	−10,097	0
Niger	107	−15,111	2
Bermuda	106	−7,048	0
Lesotho	105	−24,115	2
Sudan	100	−35,763	0
Bhutan	98	−68,355	0
Congo	93	−105,388	0
Aruba	92	−28,419	0
Suriname	81	−2,158	0
Saint Lucia	78	−5,614	0
Saint Vincent and the Grenadines	69	−3,203	0
Tajikistan	65	−64,995	0
Saint Kitts and Nevis	61	−2,718	0
Anguilla	58	−985	0
Guinea	58	−115,558	0
Dominica	57	−1,342	0
Palestine	51	−3,713	1
Cocos (Keeling) Islands	50	−51	0
Saint Helena	49	−7,128	0
Marshall Islands	48	−8,608	0
Liberia	46	−25,774	0
South Sudan	43	−13,076	0
Tonga	41	−6,959	0
Somalia	41	−41,049	0
Belize	38	−10,359	0
Turks and Caicos Islands	37	−2,511	0
Myanmar	35	−42,800	0
Nauru	32	−1,412	0
Pitcairn	31	27	1
Sao Tome and Principe	30	−1,157	0
Seychelles	24	−15,046	3
Gabon	18	−19,138	0
Palau	17	−316	0
Grenada	15	−1,300	0
Niue	12	−117	0
Comoros	12	−1,565	0
Tuvalu	12	−362	0
Equatorial Guinea	11	−8,381	0
Sint Maarten (Dutch part)	9	−792	0
Bonaire, Sint Eustatius and Saba	9	−388	0
Falkland Islands	8	−837	0
Saint Pierre and Miquelon	7	−678	0
Wallis and Futuna	6	−511	0
Solomon Islands	5	−10,657	0
Antigua and Barbuda	4	−523	0
Kiribati	3	−2,339	0
Northern Mariana Islands	2	−137	0
Guinea-Bissau	2	−5,224	0
Syria	1	−16,640	0
Western Sahara	1	−16	0

== Observatory of Economic Complexity ==
Data is for 2023, in United States dollars.

List of countries by telephone exports (2023)
Country	Trade value
China	296,997,543,012
Vietnam	62,916,449,173
United States	29,630,091,778
Netherlands	21,134,103,624
United Arab Emirates	19,329,793,889
India	19,262,224,446
Taiwan	16,738,771,023
Mexico	15,926,289,807
Czech Republic	14,408,911,184
Thailand	11,613,763,492
Hong Kong	11,485,150,423
Germany	10,973,784,430
South Korea	9,967,603,712
Malaysia	9,733,408,519
Singapore	6,201,465,420
United Kingdom	4,792,399,047
Ireland	4,031,350,335
Slovakia	3,996,453,044
Hungary	3,869,813,329
Sweden	3,766,324,812
Italy	3,674,932,920
Indonesia	3,307,790,081
Japan	3,299,185,178
France	3,072,119,682
Israel	2,960,540,231
Poland	2,419,217,279
Canada	2,000,121,051
Romania	1,787,136,851
Spain	1,593,724,597
Belgium	1,454,816,117
Philippines	1,315,345,185
Austria	1,230,486,706
Estonia	1,055,195,513
Finland	806,652,855
Latvia	760,019,802
Denmark	727,061,983
Australia	647,060,702
Saudi Arabia	548,178,819
Armenia	534,997,592
Lithuania	527,340,364
Switzerland	470,197,124
Turkey	389,996,468
Tunisia	389,287,586
Portugal	360,050,633
Kazakhstan	356,384,293
Greece	336,752,954
Norway	319,464,960
South Africa	265,021,321
Oman	248,983,508
Bulgaria	236,215,290
Slovenia	235,282,435
Brazil	228,895,258
New Zealand	199,933,936
Laos	181,268,641
Morocco	147,196,050
Kuwait	142,143,885
Russia	139,828,078
Macau	139,578,861
Qatar	105,603,528
Bahrain	98,231,414
Kyrgyzstan	93,091,413
Cyprus	92,370,620
Croatia	90,463,423
Ukraine	84,070,922
Cambodia	79,320,323
Chile	68,507,642
Luxembourg	68,251,333
Serbia	64,788,237
Uzbekistan	62,228,091
Egypt	50,745,078
Costa Rica	45,856,716
Dominican Republic	43,381,238
Panama	40,906,207
North Macedonia	39,085,066
Colombia	25,131,969
Guatemala	24,530,341
Nigeria	18,305,242
Malta	13,500,840
Peru	13,160,216
Pakistan	12,830,584
Sri Lanka	11,155,548
Kenya	9,876,176
Ecuador	9,782,278
Mauritius	8,084,627
Paraguay	7,481,946
Jordan	7,468,811
Cayman Islands	6,965,307
Albania	6,710,671
Seychelles	6,186,933
Namibia	6,109,846
Iceland	5,532,410
Curacao	5,416,504
Lebanon	5,128,659
El Salvador	5,057,793
Argentina	4,891,270
Montenegro	4,885,876
Tanzania	4,553,999
Ghana	4,114,989
Uruguay	4,043,693
Jamaica	3,960,506
Myanmar	3,867,261
North Korea	3,854,202
Tokelau	3,611,258
Belarus	3,432,421
Bosnia and Herzegovina	3,311,436
Uganda	3,180,488
Bolivia	3,161,770
Cote d'Ivoire	3,127,574
Azerbaijan	3,067,204
Cameroon	3,062,991
Senegal	2,890,804
Fiji	2,842,006
Moldova	2,221,855
Bangladesh	2,164,101
Suriname	1,987,625
Georgia	1,955,837
Honduras	1,910,527
Iraq	1,907,392
DR Congo	1,855,085
Zambia	1,705,226
Nepal	1,676,106
Mozambique	1,597,527
Nicaragua	1,545,434
Papua New Guinea	1,456,775
Iran	1,433,800
Botswana	1,431,157
Algeria	1,382,551
Gabon	1,352,938
American Samoa	1,247,789
Brunei	1,216,751
Andorra	1,062,557
Aruba	994,132
Eswatini	935,358
Cuba	874,899
Timor-Leste	869,187
Angola	858,774
Greenland	782,065
French Polynesia	774,589
Ethiopia	749,520
Mali	733,615
Samoa	726,637
Tuvalu	702,470
Benin	701,508
Cape Verde	615,732
Trinidad and Tobago	605,766
Christmas Island	565,076
Venezuela	531,392
San Marino	502,827
Libya	437,013
New Caledonia	429,598
Madagascar	416,085
Chad	412,880
Burkina Faso	399,518
Mongolia	354,224
Sudan	329,659
Belize	297,604
Rwanda	284,859
Cocos (Keeling) Islands	273,796
Tajikistan	270,905
Zimbabwe	253,911
Maldives	233,889
Guinea	232,663
Afghanistan	230,184
Togo	194,592
Comoros	175,020
Haiti	165,427
Sierra Leone	164,597
Gibraltar	146,550
Lesotho	145,159
Bahamas	143,250
Saint Vincent and the Grenadines	141,914
Guyana	140,929
Malawi	135,261
Niger	130,563
Falkland Islands	128,718
Somalia	126,333
Djibouti	122,440
Micronesia	114,328
Palestine	114,005
Congo	112,115
British Virgin Islands	111,985
Guam	100,291
Montserrat	87,189
Bermuda	75,040
Bhutan	74,552
Barbados	72,854
Saint Lucia	71,056
Saint Helena	70,490
Eritrea	70,322
Central African Republic	69,700
Saint Martin	54,916
Syria	54,787
Palau	54,665
Liberia	50,942
Saint Kitts and Nevis	45,431
Dominica	40,587
Mauritania	38,937
Kiribati	37,284
Turks and Caicos Islands	36,133
Gambia	35,863
Saint Barthelemy	30,060
Equatorial Guinea	24,954
Vanuatu	24,242
Yemen	24,241
Marshall Islands	22,485
Cook Islands	21,623
Anguilla	17,047
Grenada	14,140
Niue	14,078
Tonga	12,609
Nauru	12,587
Antigua and Barbuda	12,225
Northern Mariana Islands	11,206
Norfolk Island	9,065
Solomon Islands	8,516
Pitcairn Islands	5,480
Sao Tome and Principe	4,609
French South Antarctic Territory	3,931
South Sudan	3,688
Burundi	3,256
Guinea-Bissau	3,112
Turkmenistan	3,022
Wallis and Futuna	2,538
Bonaire	2,353
Saint Pierre and Miquelon	1,485
British Indian Ocean Territory	36

== Sources ==
- atlas.media.mit.edu − Observatory of Economic complexity − Countries that export Telephones (2012)
