= List of countries by pharmaceutical exports =

The following is a list of countries by pharmaceutical exports, using the Harmonized System code 30.

Global sales from exported drugs and medicines by country total US$371.3 billion in 2018. Overall the value of drugs and medicine exports grew by an average 5.80% for all exporting countries since 2014 when drugs and medicines shipments were valued at $344.1 billion. Year over year, there was a 7.9% uptick from 2017 to 2018.

Among continents, European countries sold the highest dollar value worth of exported drugs and medicines during 2018 with shipments from Europe totalling $295.8 billion or 79.70% of the global total. In second place were Asian pharmaceutical exporters at 10.70% while 8.10% of worldwide drugs and medicine shipments originated from North America.

Smaller percentages came from drugs and medicines suppliers in Latin America (0.7%) excluding Mexico but including the Caribbean, Oceania (0.5%) led by Australia and New Zealand, then Africa (0.2%).

The 4−digit Harmonized Tariff System code prefixes for drugs and medicines are:

- 3003 for medicaments consisting of two or more constituents mixed together (4.3% of global total)
- 3004 for medicaments consisting of mixed or unmixed products (95.7%).

== International Trade Centre ==
Data is for 2024, in thousands of United States dollars.

List of countries by pharmaceutical exports (2024)
Country	Value exported (thousands USD)	Value imported (thousands USD)	Trade balance (thousands USD)
World	928,975,232	976,677,484	−47,702,252
Germany	129,088,980	79,237,877	49,851,103
Switzerland	110,678,748	68,285,831	42,392,917
United States	102,488,068	217,320,782	−114,832,714
Ireland	89,815,222	16,650,911	73,164,311
Belgium	84,934,569	66,194,364	18,740,205
Italy	55,552,143	33,048,343	22,503,800
France	40,322,238	34,683,115	5,639,123
Netherlands	38,541,479	27,063,777	11,477,702
United Kingdom	29,103,095	31,087,682	−1,984,587
Slovenia	27,196,651	10,999,363	16,197,288
India	23,427,774	3,292,984	20,134,790
Denmark	21,824,168	6,724,953	15,099,215
Austria	21,211,914	11,776,542	9,435,372
Spain	18,260,920	22,754,657	−4,493,737
China	13,702,663	46,697,335	−32,994,672
Sweden	13,493,707	7,380,861	6,112,846
Canada	11,873,874	19,690,138	−7,816,264
Hungary	10,972,609	8,018,791	2,953,818
Singapore	9,559,148	6,110,402	3,448,746
South Korea	8,499,876	10,128,546	−1,628,670
Japan	8,423,103	31,347,839	−22,924,736
Poland	6,978,302	14,287,579	−7,309,277
Czech Republic	4,415,386	7,893,177	−3,477,791
Portugal	3,612,606	4,184,907	−572,301
Australia	3,254,149	11,447,613	−8,193,464
Greece	3,042,868	4,300,459	−1,257,591
Mexico	2,742,639	8,818,795	−6,076,156
Finland	2,450,748	2,645,009	−194,261
Turkey	2,315,473	5,669,979	−3,354,506
Panama	2,308,559	2,558,535	−249,976
Romania	2,056,243	6,582,943	−4,526,700
Hong Kong	2,008,408	3,815,150	−1,806,742
Israel	1,845,373	3,641,872	−1,796,499
Norway	1,524,111	3,174,523	−1,650,412
Lithuania	1,351,383	1,929,237	−577,854
Croatia	1,339,394	2,065,168	−725,774
Bulgaria	1,310,610	2,250,752	−940,142
Brazil	1,230,170	12,779,962	−11,549,792
Taiwan	1,160,640	6,008,821	−4,848,181
Slovakia	876,232	3,072,503	−2,196,271
Indonesia	748,916	1,429,908	−680,992
Latvia	700,554	1,048,023	−347,469
Thailand	688,782	3,201,646	−2,512,864
Russia	665,338	12,655,426	−11,990,088
South Africa	601,707	2,633,041	−2,031,334
Saudi Arabia	580,395	9,807,895	−9,227,500
Dominican Republic	535,523	1,047,439	−511,916
Serbia	474,451	1,735,746	−1,261,295
Cyprus	470,897	552,854	−81,957
Malta	458,989	521,288	−62,299
Costa Rica	456,107	1,172,707	−716,600
Malaysia	451,183	2,354,228	−1,903,045
Egypt	448,712	3,611,926	−3,163,214
Jordan	439,144	824,100	−384,956
Guatemala	422,791	1,120,242	−697,451
Pakistan	421,722	834,505	−412,783
New Zealand	410,267	1,487,296	−1,077,029
Colombia	396,271	4,038,381	−3,642,110
Ukraine	362,592	2,507,054	−2,144,462
United Arab Emirates	343,450	4,669,623	−4,326,173
Vietnam	336,021	3,629,048	−3,293,027
Argentina	317,561	2,610,223	−2,292,662
Luxembourg	253,866	842,053	−588,187
Uruguay	198,098	453,933	−255,835
North Macedonia	197,068	290,566	−93,498
Chile	184,928	2,515,863	−2,330,935
El Salvador	182,846	675,917	−493,071
Kenya	175,224	793,474	−618,250
Bangladesh	160,613	388,756	−228,143
Estonia	153,357	896,332	−742,975
Iceland	128,972	283,579	−154,607
Bosnia and Herzegovina	108,028	545,997	−437,969
Peru	98,725	1,212,262	−1,113,537
Iran	97,536	1,002,441	−904,905
Kazakhstan	81,407	2,434,319	−2,352,912
Morocco	79,914	953,534	−873,620
Belarus	77,342	729,559	−652,217
Paraguay	74,707	512,039	−437,332
Georgia	67,312	579,667	−512,355
Oman	65,550	473,159	−407,609
Tunisia	53,765	531,026	−477,261
Moldova	52,872	323,866	−270,994
Kuwait	50,193	2,481,573	−2,431,380
Honduras	46,671	785,511	−738,840
Montenegro	41,940	224,803	−182,863
Philippines	38,559	2,451,564	−2,413,005
Armenia	35,717	250,768	−215,051
Uganda	33,752	385,815	−352,063
Ecuador	32,189	1,224,337	−1,192,148
Uzbekistan	31,574	2,784,482	−2,752,908
Mauritius	30,607	189,537	−158,930
Barbados	30,246	48,500	−18,254
Algeria	23,113	1,578,262	−1,555,149
Cambodia	15,759	273,569	−257,810
Botswana	15,582	157,887	−142,305
Ghana	14,804	466,083	−451,279
Nepal	14,717	284,850	−270,133
Cuba	14,185	86,967	−72,782
Nicaragua	12,593	571,600	−559,007
Fiji	11,717	37,860	−26,143
Albania	11,627	302,386	−290,759
Lebanon	11,376	511,517	−500,141
Côte d'Ivoire	10,462	553,376	−542,914
Sri Lanka	8,068	476,634	−468,566
Venezuela	7,395	331,357	−323,962
Eritrea	6,098	9,684	−3,586
Mali	5,917	214,880	−208,963
Brunei	5,626	112,519	−106,893
Guyana	5,536	34,475	−28,939
Togo	5,523	125,562	−120,039
Zimbabwe	5,157	212,532	−207,375
Djibouti	4,316	37,760	−33,444
Jamaica	4,241	172,474	−168,233
North Korea	4,188	28,205	−24,017
Zambia	4,177	381,467	−377,290
Tanzania	3,922	421,464	−417,542
Namibia	3,211	173,200	−169,989
Trinidad and Tobago	3,075	198,093	−195,018
Azerbaijan	2,915	529,967	−527,052
Senegal	2,837	361,779	−358,942
United States Minor Outlying Islands	2,752	684	2,068
Syria	2,583	79,027	−76,444
Sierra Leone	2,431	109,893	−107,462
Cameroon	2,359	282,974	−280,615
Andorra	2,246	49,460	−47,214
Qatar	2,181	723,230	−721,049
Kyrgyzstan	2,171	238,652	−236,481
Bolivia	2,054	269,078	−267,024
Eswatini	1,768	34,541	−32,773
Ethiopia	1,536	461,087	−459,551
Benin	1,515	161,708	−160,193
Mozambique	1,409	257,087	−255,678
Aruba	1,315	48,358	−47,043
Nigeria	1,164	1,026,539	−1,025,375
Laos	1,063	68,506	−67,443
Burkina Faso	960	287,968	−287,008
Myanmar	678	341,039	−340,361
French Southern and Antarctic Territories	675	241	434
Tokelau	641	120	521
Dominica	619	2,637	−2,018
Belize	533	20,081	−19,548
Macao	521	493,691	−493,170
Palestine	472	76,364	−75,892
Bahrain	443	293,942	−293,499
Afghanistan	423	392,676	−392,253
Yemen	420	278,261	−277,841
Madagascar	398	197,032	−196,634
Antigua and Barbuda	391	9,244	−8,853
Curaçao	389	47,078	−46,689
Saint Helena	371	864	−493
Iraq	342	1,681,765	−1,681,423
New Caledonia	321	126,469	−126,148
Congo	301	66,572	−66,271
Bahamas	287	72,022	−71,735
Niger	276	133,728	−133,452
Mongolia	263	200,020	−199,757
Angola	249	264,355	−264,106
Cayman Islands	241	32,637	−32,396
Lesotho	232	36,597	−36,365
Saint Lucia	225	9,122	−8,897
Rwanda	217	93,179	−92,962
Greenland	214	2,625	−2,411
Haiti	210	42,201	−41,991
Central African Republic	194	65,474	−65,280
Papua New Guinea	189	46,597	−46,408
Sudan	179	246,096	−245,917
Cocos (Keeling) Islands	168	15	153
Guinea	145	76,360	−76,215
Solomon Islands	142	5,196	−5,054
Saint Kitts and Nevis	109	6,545	−6,436
Micronesia	107	1,032	−925
DR Congo	103	366,488	−366,385
Grenada	96	9,266	−9,170
Comoros	87	9,587	−9,500
Turkmenistan	84	124,956	−124,872
Faroe Islands	68	38,091	−38,023
Falkland Islands	68	1,841	−1,773
Burundi	59	46,165	−46,106
Gabon	56	66,338	−66,282
Suriname	48	15,481	−15,433
Somalia	46	130,715	−130,669
Sint Maarten (Dutch part)	45	10,434	−10,389
Mauritania	45	109,666	−109,621
Vanuatu	42	5,137	−5,095
Nauru	38	641	−603
Libya	36	434,781	−434,745
Turks and Caicos Islands	35	6,349	−6,314
Malawi	34	175,983	−175,949
British Virgin Islands	30	4,882	−4,852
British Indian Ocean Territory	25	7,505	−7,480
Guinea-Bissau	24	8,124	−8,100
Liberia	23	41,252	−41,229
Anguilla	22	621	−599
Tajikistan	20	92,348	−92,328
Saint Pierre and Miquelon	17	4,732	−4,715
Kiribati	17	1,859	−1,842
Bonaire, Sint Eustatius and Saba	11	9,954	−9,943
Sao Tome and Principe	8	1,832	−1,824
Chad	7	114,320	−114,313
Bermuda	7	39,019	−39,012
Cook Islands	6	1,629	−1,623
Northern Mariana Islands	6	47	−41
Gambia	5	7,232	−7,227
Seychelles	5	20,050	−20,045
Samoa	3	6,041	−6,038
Bhutan	3	10,523	−10,520
Equatorial Guinea	1	8,718	−8,717
Palau	1	624	−623
Gibraltar	1	1,511	−1,510
Saint Vincent and the Grenadines	1	5,791	−5,790

== Observatory of Economic Complexity ==
Data is for 2023, in United States dollars.

List of countries by pharmaceutical exports (2023)
Country	Trade value
Germany	116,845,883,345
United States	91,343,281,207
Ireland	86,198,572,374
Switzerland	81,028,562,071
Belgium	52,685,297,073
Italy	50,735,824,856
France	38,485,364,971
Netherlands	32,822,862,900
United Kingdom	26,837,515,169
Spain	25,352,568,760
India	24,123,265,597
Denmark	20,837,002,856
Singapore	20,641,813,264
Austria	18,718,595,357
Slovenia	18,031,196,851
Sweden	14,640,392,962
Japan	13,068,866,431
South Korea	12,448,628,651
China	11,820,100,212
Hungary	10,059,862,799
Canada	9,735,132,771
Poland	3,858,025,682
Czech Republic	3,710,874,025
Portugal	2,966,468,959
Greece	2,923,093,488
Australia	2,648,049,172
Finland	2,556,512,247
Mexico	2,520,325,371
Turkey	2,464,241,358
Israel	2,119,184,945
Romania	1,510,237,593
United Arab Emirates	1,454,719,395
Brazil	1,400,629,854
Bulgaria	1,398,228,108
Taiwan	1,304,754,136
Croatia	1,224,587,612
Lithuania	1,218,632,380
Argentina	1,038,006,381
Norway	1,033,627,430
Hong Kong	956,031,481
Jordan	893,019,746
Thailand	760,061,446
Slovakia	746,524,017
Malta	722,794,273
Indonesia	715,782,318
Latvia	697,919,175
Malaysia	592,015,160
Russia	569,623,259
Saudi Arabia	552,570,829
Cyprus	502,675,174
Egypt	490,079,014
Colombia	479,287,514
New Zealand	473,503,404
Serbia	466,296,107
South Africa	457,660,266
Dominican Republic	454,044,813
Costa Rica	440,242,425
Guatemala	402,739,113
Kenya	370,105,056
Pakistan	359,605,590
Ukraine	283,127,969
Chile	262,758,585
Vietnam	239,076,223
El Salvador	183,523,571
North Macedonia	182,290,551
Uruguay	174,925,818
Estonia	174,097,936
Panama	158,314,330
Luxembourg	155,832,506
Morocco	151,608,177
Qatar	149,566,386
Peru	119,192,168
Bangladesh	117,485,060
Georgia	116,375,810
Oman	111,356,291
Iceland	110,270,010
Tunisia	107,881,051
Bosnia and Herzegovina	96,501,212
Paraguay	90,218,537
Iran	82,328,554
Philippines	64,261,077
Montenegro	63,416,053
Belarus	59,079,900
Kazakhstan	49,234,550
Mauritius	47,645,934
Lebanon	45,427,862
Kuwait	44,361,390
Moldova	43,444,078
Ecuador	43,095,405
Uganda	37,131,173
Armenia	34,092,219
Honduras	33,757,223
Uzbekistan	23,498,824
Nicaragua	21,394,826
San Marino	17,803,616
Cambodia	17,254,470
Azerbaijan	14,777,675
Sri Lanka	14,393,705
Cuba	14,375,127
Macau	14,329,587
Mali	12,990,216
Botswana	12,387,976
Nepal	11,225,227
Bahrain	10,777,834
Fiji	10,278,314
Albania	9,358,187
Anguilla	7,921,816
Ghana	7,568,096
Jamaica	7,250,235
Venezuela	6,225,425
Barbados	5,863,615
Zimbabwe	5,829,850
Curacao	5,398,918
Togo	5,185,494
Algeria	4,545,237
Cote d'Ivoire	4,348,371
Tanzania	4,209,563
Zambia	3,811,928
North Korea	3,736,675
Kyrgyzstan	3,679,808
Senegal	3,382,646
Eswatini	3,126,771
Benin	2,951,710
Ethiopia	2,916,642
Bolivia	2,701,765
Nigeria	2,595,892
Niger	2,460,829
Aruba	2,268,305
Namibia	2,215,602
Palestine	2,211,256
Sierra Leone	2,146,694
Syria	2,134,310
Myanmar	1,998,522
Cameroon	1,799,187
Angola	1,622,498
Dominica	1,586,444
Brunei	1,510,399
Burkina Faso	1,333,687
Rwanda	1,089,989
Seychelles	1,087,748
Belize	963,472
Iraq	912,491
Tokelau	654,450
Nauru	583,645
Trinidad and Tobago	552,828
Guyana	532,847
Liberia	499,779
Madagascar	407,061
Grenada	363,104
Bahamas	315,242
Saint Helena	309,739
Bermuda	304,741
Lesotho	280,422
Saint Barthelemy	274,466
Guinea	255,438
Andorra	234,203
Mongolia	225,480
Antigua and Barbuda	206,988
Mozambique	193,887
Afghanistan	165,536
Turkmenistan	152,085
Laos	139,856
Suriname	136,422
Pitcairn Islands	134,655
Yemen	134,251
Gabon	130,325
Mauritania	111,660
New Caledonia	101,678
Eritrea	97,562
Sudan	95,265
French Polynesia	89,239
Cook Islands	89,113
Montserrat	85,659
Marshall Islands	80,250
Samoa	75,364
American Samoa	72,868
Chad	70,872
Turks and Caicos Islands	67,330
DR Congo	63,076
Bhutan	62,096
Cayman Islands	46,230
Timor-Leste	43,583
Malawi	43,402
Congo	39,958
Saint Vincent and the Grenadines	36,869
Saint Martin	33,536
Djibouti	33,393
Cape Verde	28,723
South Sudan	26,653
Maldives	25,500
Haiti	22,472
Saint Lucia	18,517
Gambia	18,366
Bonaire	14,834
Libya	14,402
Saint Pierre and Miquelon	13,818
Somalia	12,169
British Virgin Islands	9,529
Greenland	9,062
Central African Republic	7,164
Sao Tome and Principe	6,592
Papua New Guinea	6,179
British Indian Ocean Territory	5,588
Vanuatu	5,338
Gibraltar	5,033
Niue	4,584
Tuvalu	4,019
Cocos (Keeling) Islands	3,248
Wallis and Futuna	2,422
Tonga	2,265
Tajikistan	2,053
Guam	1,957
Burundi	1,386
Saint Kitts and Nevis	1,318
Falkland Islands	1,243
French South Antarctic Territory	959
Comoros	539
Kiribati	413
Equatorial Guinea	178
Christmas Island	95
Micronesia	94
Guinea-Bissau	73
Solomon Islands	47
Northern Mariana Islands	1
