= List of birds of the United States Minor Outlying Islands =

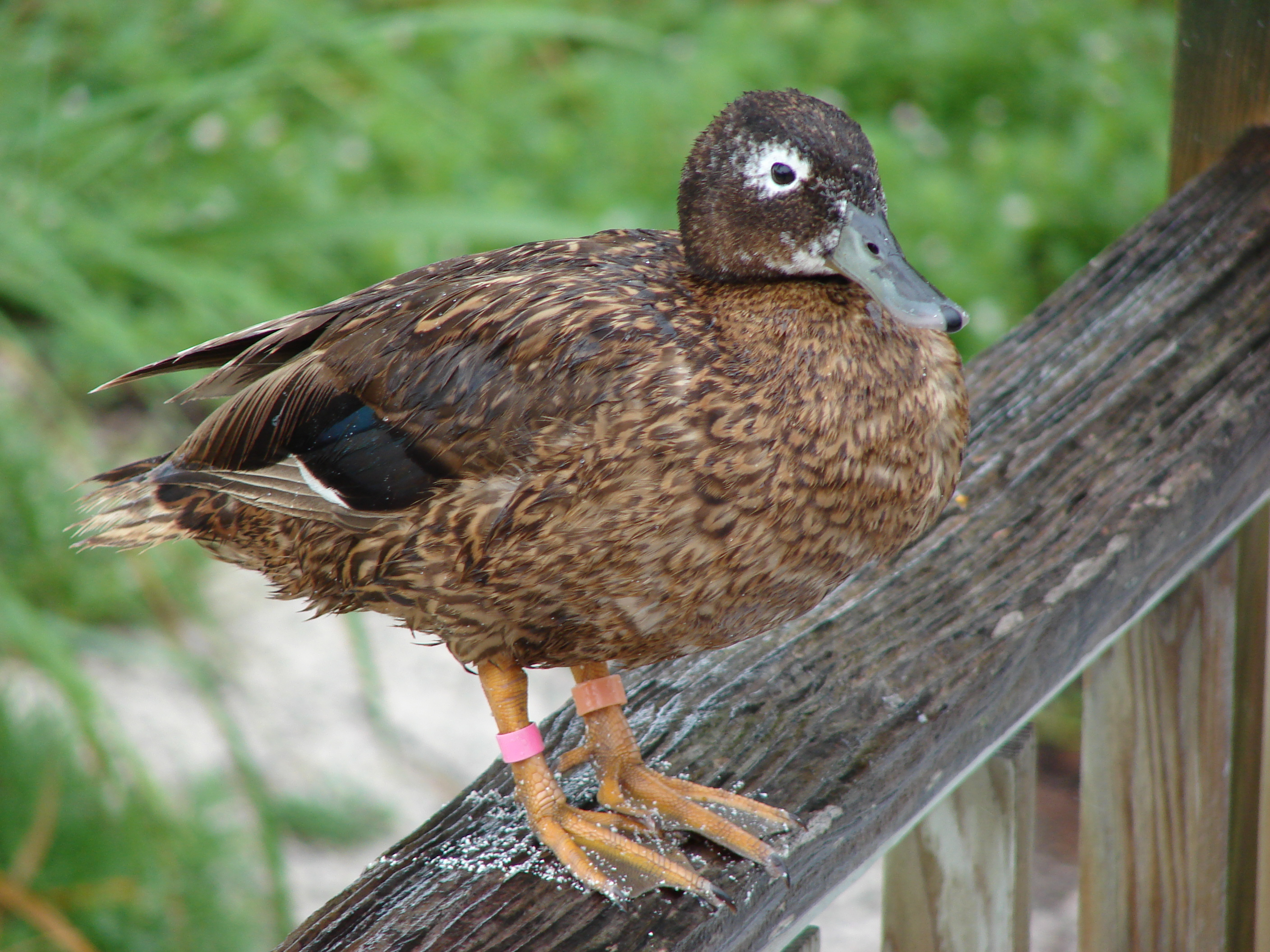
The critically endangered Laysan duck is found at Midway Atoll

This is a list of birds of the United States Minor Outlying Islands. This area consists of Baker Island, Howland Island, Jarvis Island, Johnston Atoll, Kingman Reef, Midway Atoll, Palmyra Atoll, and Wake Island in the Pacific Ocean and Navassa Island in the Caribbean Sea.

The two areas between them have recorded 236 species. Of them, 24 have been recorded at both Navassa Island and at least one of the Pacific Ocean entities and 49 have been found only on Navassa Island. Of the 236, 123 are rare or accidental at one or both of the areas. Three species are endemic, one is extinct, two have been extirpated, and nine were introduced by humans.

The Wake Island rail was a species endemic to Wake Island, but it is now extinct. The Laysan duck is endemic to the Northwest Hawaiian Islands (which includes Midway Atoll — Midway Atoll is part of the U.S. Minor Outlying Islands, not the state of Hawaii). The endemic and critically endangered Nihoa finch was extirpated from Midway Atoll.

This list's taxonomic treatment (designation and sequence of orders, families and species) and nomenclature (English and scientific names) are those of The Clements Checklist of Birds of the World, 2019 edition.

The following tags are used to designate some species. Unless noted otherwise, the species has been recorded only in the Pacific Ocean entities.

- (A) Accidental – occurrence based on one or two (rarely more) records and unlikely to occur regularly
- (E) Extinct – a species which no longer exists
- (Ex) Extirpated – a species which no longer occurs in this list's area, but other populations still exist elsewhere
- (I) Introduced – a species established solely as result of direct or indirect human intervention
- (En) Endemic – a native species found only in this list's area
- (Nav) Navassa – a species recorded only on Navassa Island
- (Both) Both – a species recorded in both a Pacific Ocean entity and Navassa Island

== Ducks, geese, and waterfowl ==
Order: Anseriformes Family: Anatidae

Anatidae includes the ducks and most duck-like waterfowl, such as geese and swans. These birds are adapted to an aquatic existence with webbed feet, bills which are flattened to a greater or lesser extent, and feathers that are excellent at shedding water due to special oils.

- Emperor goose, Anser canagica (A)
- Snow goose, Anser caerulescens (A)
- Greater white-fronted goose, Anser albifrons (A)
- Brant, Branta bernicla (A)
- Cackling goose, Branta hutchinsii
- Tundra swan, Cygnus columbianus (A)
- Garganey, Spatula querquedula
- Blue-winged teal, Spatula discors (Both) (A – Pacific islands)
- Northern shoveler, Spatula clypeata
- Gadwall, Mareca strepera (A)
- Falcated duck, Mareca falcata (A)
- Eurasian wigeon, Mareca penelope (A)
- American wigeon, Mareca americana (Both) (A – Navassa)
- Laysan duck, Anas laysanensis (I) (The Laysan duck was introduced to Midway Atoll, but the native population is considered endemic the state of Hawaii.)
- Mallard, Anas platyrhynchos (A)
- Northern pintail, Anas acuta
- Green-winged teal, Anas crecca (A)
- Canvasback, Aythya valisineria (A)
- Redhead, Aythya americana (A)
- Common pochard, Aythya ferina (A)
- Ring-necked duck, Aythya collaris
- Tufted duck, Aythya fuligula (A)
- Greater scaup, Aythya marila (A)
- Lesser scaup, Aythya affinis (A)
- Harlequin duck, Histrionicus histrionicus (A)
- Black scoter, Melanitta americana (A)
- Long-tailed duck, Clangula hyemalis (A)
- Bufflehead, Bucephala albeola (A)
- Common goldeneye, Bucephala clangula (A)
- Red-breasted merganser, Mergus serrator (A)

== Pigeons and doves ==
Order: Columbiformes Family: Columbidae

Pigeons and doves are stout-bodied birds with short necks and short slender bills with a fleshy cere. They feed on seeds, fruit, and plants. Unlike most other birds, the doves and pigeons produce "crop milk," which is secreted by a sloughing of fluid-filled cells from the lining of the crop. Both sexes produce this highly nutritious substance to feed to the young.

- Rock pigeon, Columba livia (I)
- Scaly-naped pigeon, Patagioenas squamosa (Nav)
- White-crowned pigeon, Patagioenas leucocephala (Nav)
- Plain pigeon, Patagioenas inornata (Nav)
- Common ground dove, Columbina passerina (Nav)
- White-winged dove, Zenaida asiatica (Nav)
- Mourning dove, Zenaida macroura (A)

== Cuckoos ==
Order: Cuculiformes Family: Cuculidae

The family Cuculidae includes cuckoos, roadrunners, and anis. These birds are of variable size with slender bodies, long tails, and strong legs.

- Smooth-billed ani, Crotophaga ani (Nav)
- Yellow-billed cuckoo, Coccyzus americanus (Nav)
- Mangrove cuckoo, Coccyzus minor (Nav)
- Long-tailed koel, Urodynamis tailtensis
- Common cuckoo, Cuculus canorus (A)
- Oriental cuckoo, Cuculus optatus (A)

== Nightjars and allies ==
Order: Caprimulgiformes Family: Caprimulgidae

Nightjars are medium-sized nocturnal birds that usually nest on the ground. They have long wings, short legs, and very short bills. Most have small feet, of little use for walking, and long pointed wings. Their soft plumage is cryptically colored to resemble bark or leaves.

- Common nighthawk, Chordeiles minor (Nav) (A)
- Antillean nighthawk, Chordeiles gundlachii (A)
- Chuck-will's-widow, Antrostomus carolinensis (Nav) (A)

== Swifts ==
Order: Caprimulgiformes Family: Apodidae

The swifts are small birds which spend the majority of their lives flying. These birds have very short legs and never settle voluntarily on the ground, perching instead only on vertical surfaces. Many swifts have long swept-back wings which resemble a crescent or boomerang.

- Chimney swift, Chaetura pelagica (Nav) (A)
- Pacific swift, Apus pacificus (A)

== Rails, gallinules, and coots ==
Order: Gruiformes Family: Rallidae

Rallidae is a large family of small to medium-sized birds which includes the rails, crakes, coots, and gallinules. The most typical family members occupy dense vegetation in damp environments near lakes, swamps, or rivers. In general they are shy and secretive birds, making them difficult to observe. Most species have strong legs and long toes which are well adapted to soft uneven surfaces. They tend to have short, rounded wings and to be weak fliers.

- Wake Island rail, Gallirallus wakensis (Ex) (E)
- Eurasian moorhen, Gallinula chloropus (A)
- Common gallinule, Gallinula galeata (Nav)
- Hawaiian coot, Fulica alai (A)
- Laysan rail, Zapornia palmeri (E)

== Stilts and avocets ==
Order: Charadriiformes Family: Recurvirostridae

Recurvirostridae is a family of large wading birds which includes the avocets and stilts. The avocets have long legs and long up-curved bills. The stilts have extremely long legs and long, thin, straight bills.

- Black-winged stilt, Himantopus himantopus (A)
- Black-necked stilt, Himantopus mexicanus (A)

== Plovers and lapwings ==
Order: Charadriiformes Family: Charadriidae

The family Charadriidae includes the plovers, dotterels, and lapwings. They are small to medium-sized birds with compact bodies, short thick necks, and long, usually pointed, wings. They are found in open country worldwide, mostly in habitats near water.

- Black-bellied plover, Pluvialis squatarola (A)
- Pacific golden-plover, Pluvialis fulva
- Lesser sand-plover, Charadrius mongolus (A)
- Common ringed plover, Charadrius hiaticula (A)
- Semipalmated plover, Charadrius semipalmatus (A)
- Little ringed plover, Charadrius dubius (A)

== Sandpipers and allies ==
Order: Charadriiformes Family: Scolopacidae

Scolopacidae is a large diverse family of small to medium-sized shorebirds including the sandpipers, curlews, godwits, shanks, tattlers, woodcocks, snipes, dowitchers, and phalaropes. The majority of these species eat small invertebrates picked out of the mud or soil. Different lengths of legs and bills enable multiple species to feed in the same habitat, particularly on the coast, without direct competition for food.

- Bristle-thighed curlew, Numenius tahitiensis
- Whimbrel, Numenius phaeopus (A)
- Far Eastern curlew, Numenius madagascariensis (A)
- Bar-tailed godwit, Limosa lapponica (A)
- Black-tailed godwit, Limosa limosa (A)
- Marbled godwit, Limosa fedoa (A)
- Ruddy turnstone, Arenaria interpres (Both)
- Red knot, Calidris canutus (A)
- Ruff, Calidris pugnax (A)
- Sharp-tailed sandpiper, Calidris acuminata
- Long-toed stint, Calidris subminuta (A)
- Sanderling, Calidris alba (Both)
- Dunlin, Calidris alpina
- Baird's sandpiper, Calidris bairdii (A)
- Little stint, Calidris minuta (A)
- Buff-breasted sandpiper, Calidris subruficollis (A)
- Pectoral sandpiper, Calidris melanotos (A)
- Western sandpiper, Calidris mauri (A)
- Short-billed dowitcher, Limnodromus griseus (A)
- Long-billed dowitcher, Limnodromus scolopaceus (A)
- Common snipe, Gallinago gallinago
- Wilson's snipe, Gallinago delicata (A)
- Red-necked phalarope, Phalaropus lobatus (A)
- Red phalarope, Phalaropus fulicarius
- Spotted sandpiper, Actitis macularius (A)
- Solitary sandpiper, Tringa solitaria (Nav) (A)
- Gray-tailed tattler, Tringa brevipes (A)
- Wandering tattler, Tringa incana
- Greater yellowlegs, Tringa melanoleuca
- Lesser yellowlegs, Tringa flavipes (A)
- Marsh sandpiper, Tringa stagnatilis (A)
- Wood sandpiper, Tringa glareola (A)

== Skuas and jaegers ==
Order: Charadriiformes Family: Stercorariidae

Skuas are in general medium to large birds, typically with gray or brown plumage, often with white markings on the wings. They have longish bills with hooked tips and webbed feet with sharp claws. They look like large dark gulls, but have a fleshy cere above the upper mandible. They are strong, acrobatic fliers.

- Pomarine jaeger, Stercorarius pomarinus (Both)

== Auks, murres, and puffins ==
Order: Charadriiformes Family: Alcidae

Alcids are superficially similar to penguins due to their black-and-white colors, their upright posture, and some of their habits. However, they are only distantly related to the penguins and are able to fly. Auks live on the open sea, only deliberately coming ashore to nest.

- Japanese murrelet, Synthliboramphus wumizusume (A)
- Parakeet auklet, Aethia psittacula (A)
- Horned puffin, Fratercula corniculata (A)
- Tufted puffin, Fratercula cirrhata (A)

== Gulls, terns, and skimmers ==
Order: Charadriiformes Family: Laridae

Laridae is a family of medium to large seabirds and includes gulls, terns, and skimmers. Gulls are typically gray or white, often with black markings on the head or wings. They have stout, longish bills and webbed feet. Terns are a group of generally medium to large seabirds typically with grey or white plumage, often with black markings on the head. Most terns hunt fish by diving but some pick insects off the surface of fresh water. Terns are generally long-lived birds, with several species known to live in excess of 30 years. Skimmers are a small family of tropical tern-like birds. They have an elongated lower mandible which they use to feed by flying low over the water surface and skimming the water for small fish.

- Black-legged kittiwake, Rissa tridactyla (A)
- Bonaparte's gull, Chroicocephalus philadelphia (Both) (A – Pacific islands)
- Silver gull, Chroicocephalus novaehollandiae (A)
- Black-headed gull, Chroicocephalus ridibundus (A)
- Laughing gull, Leucophaeus atricilla (A)
- Franklin's gull, Leucophaeus pipixcan (A)
- Common gull, Larus canus (A)
- Ring-billed gull, Larus delawarensis (A)
- Western gull, Larus occidentalis (A)
- Herring gull, Larus argentatus (A)
- Lesser black-backed gull, Larus fuscus (A)
- Slaty-backed gull, Larus schistisagus (A)
- Glaucous-winged gull, Larus glaucescens (A)
- Glaucous gull, Larus hyperboreus (A)
- Brown noddy, Anous stolidus (Both)
- Black noddy, Anous minutus (Both)
- Blue-gray noddy, Anous ceruleus
- White tern, Gygis alba
- Sooty tern, Onychoprion fuscatus (Both)
- Gray-backed tern, Onychoprion lunatus
- Bridled tern, Onychoprion anaethetus (Nav)
- Little tern, Sternula albifrons
- Least tern, Sternula antillarum (Both)
- Black tern, Chlidonias niger (A)
- White-winged tern, Chlidonias leucopterus (A)
- Whiskered tern, Chlidonias hybrida (A)
- Arctic tern, Sterna paradisaea (A)
- Great crested tern, Thalasseus bergii

== Tropicbirds ==
Order: Phaethontiformes Family: Phaethontidae

Tropicbirds are slender white birds of tropical oceans, with exceptionally long central tail feathers. Their long wings have black markings, as does the head.

- White-tailed tropicbird, Phaethon lepturus (Both)
- Red-billed tropicbird, Phaethon aethereus (Both) (A)
- Red-tailed tropicbird, Phaethon rubricauda

== Albatrosses ==
Order: Procellariiformes Family: Diomedeidae

The albatrosses are among the largest of flying birds, and the great albatrosses of the genus Diomedea have the largest wingspans of any extant birds.

- Salvin's albatross, Thalassarche salvini (A)
- Laysan albatross, Phoebastria immutabilis
- Black-footed albatross, Phoebastria nigripes
- Short-tailed albatross, Phoebastria albatrus

== Southern storm-petrels ==
Order: Procellariiformes Family: Oceanitidae

The storm-petrels are the smallest seabirds, relatives of the petrels, feeding on planktonic crustaceans and small fish picked from the surface, typically while hovering. The flight is fluttering and sometimes bat-like. Until 2018, these species were included with the other storm-petrels in family Hydrobatidae.

- Polynesian storm-petrel, Nesofregetta fuliginosa

== Northern storm-petrels ==
Order: Procellariiformes Family: Hydrobatidae

Though the members of this family are similar in many respects to the southern storm-petrels, including their general appearance and habits, there are enough genetic differences to warrant their placement in a separate family.

- Fork-tailed storm-petrel, Hydrobates furcatus (A)
- Leach's storm-petrel, Hydrobates leucorhous (Both)
- Band-rumped storm-petrel, Hydrobates castro (A)
- Tristram's storm-petrel, Hydrobates tristrami

== Shearwaters and petrels ==
Order: Procellariiformes Family: Procellariidae

The procellariids are the main group of medium-sized "true petrels", characterized by united nostrils with medium septum and a long outer functional primary.

- Northern fulmar, Fulmarus glacialis
- Kermadec petrel, Pterodroma neglecta
- Herald petrel, Pterodroma heraldica (A)
- Murphy's petrel, Pterodroma ultima (A)
- Mottled petrel, Pterodroma inexpectata
- Black-capped petrel, Pterodroma hasitata (Nav) (A)
- Hawaiian petrel, Pterodroma sandwichensis
- White-necked petrel, Pterodroma cervicalis (A)
- Bonin petrel, Pterodroma hypoleuca
- Black-winged petrel, Pterodroma nigripennis
- Phoenix petrel, Pterodroma alba (A)
- Bulwer's petrel, Bulweria bulwerii
- Jouanin's petrel, Bulweria fallax
- Tahiti petrel, Pseudobulweria rostrata (A)
- Cory's shearwater, Calonectris diomedea (Nav)
- Flesh-footed shearwater, Ardenna carneipes
- Wedge-tailed shearwater, Ardenna pacificus
- Buller's shearwater, Ardenna bulleri
- Sooty shearwater, Ardenna griseus (A)
- Short-tailed shearwater, Ardenna tenuirostris
- Christmas shearwater, Puffinus nativitatis
- Newell's shearwater, Puffinus newelli
- Bryan's shearwater, Puffinus bryani (A)
- Sargasso shearwater, Puffinus lherminieri (Nav) (A)
- Tropical shearwater, Puffinus bailloni

== Frigatebirds ==
Order: Suliformes Family: Fregatidae

Frigatebirds are large seabirds usually found over tropical oceans. They are large, black, or black-and-white, with long wings and deeply forked tails. The males have colored inflatable throat pouches. They do not swim or walk and cannot take off from a flat surface. Having the largest wingspan-to-body-weight ratio of any bird, they are essentially aerial, able to stay aloft for more than a week.

- Lesser frigatebird, Fregata ariel
- Magnificent frigatebird, Fregata magnificens (Nav)
- Great frigatebird, Fregata minor

== Boobies and gannets ==
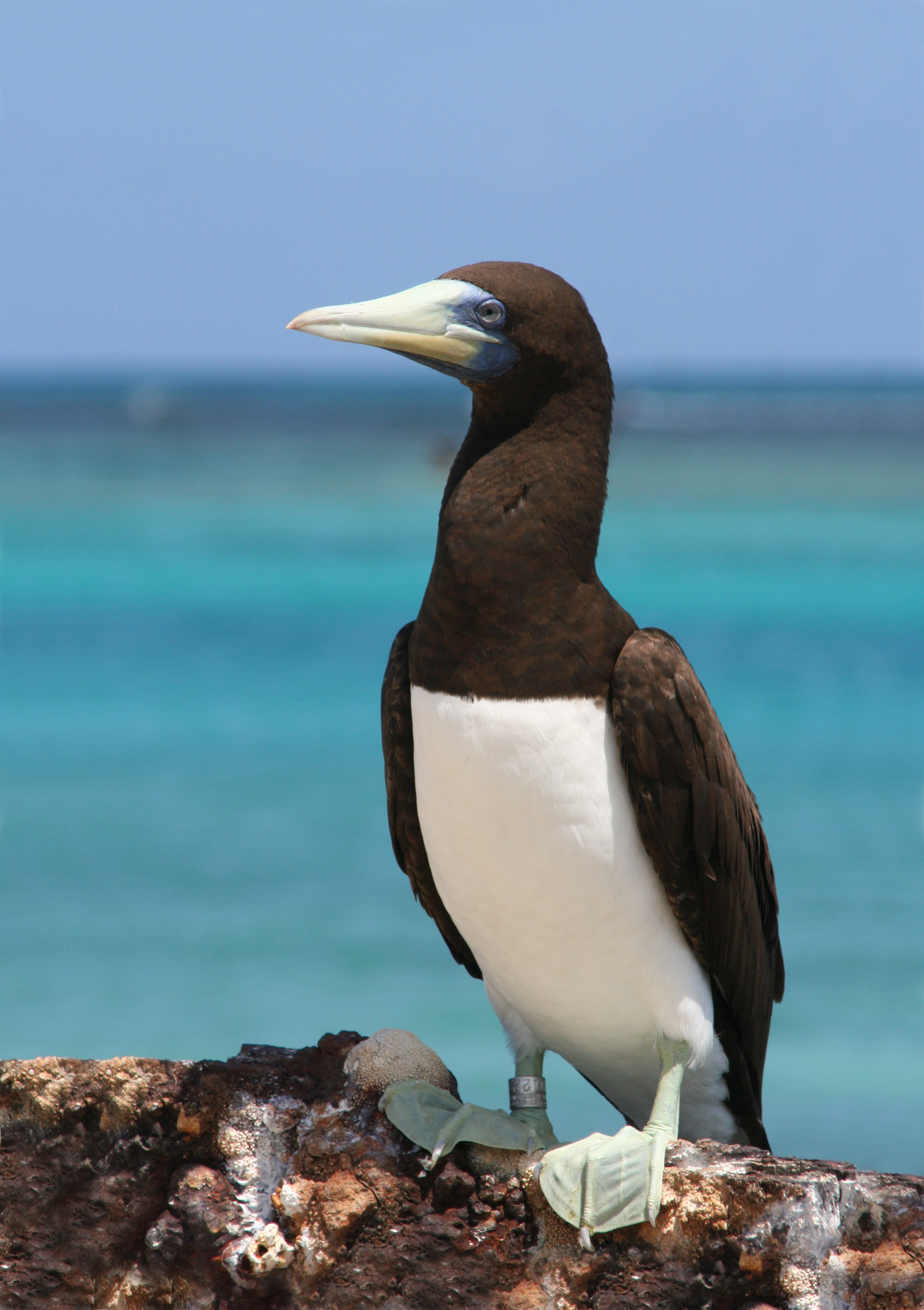
Brown Booby on Tern Island

Order: Suliformes Family: Sulidae

The sulids comprise the gannets and boobies. Both groups are medium-large coastal seabirds that plunge-dive for fish.

- Masked booby, Sula dactylatra (Both)
- Nazca booby, Sula granti (A)
- Blue-footed booby, Sula nebouxii
- Brown booby, Sula leucogaster (Both)
- Red-footed booby, Sula sula (Both)

== Cormorants ==
Order: Suliformes Family: Phalacrocoracidae

Cormorants are medium-to-large aquatic birds, usually with mainly dark plumage and areas of colored skin on the face. The bill is long, thin, and sharply hooked. Their feet are four-toed and webbed.

- Pelagic cormorant, Urile pelagicus

== Pelicans ==
Order: Pelecaniformes Family: Pelecanidae

Pelicans are very large water birds with a distinctive pouch under their beak. Like other birds in the order Pelecaniformes, they have four webbed toes.

- Brown pelican, Pelecanus occidentalis (Nav)

== Herons, egrets, and bitterns ==
Order: Pelecaniformes Family: Ardeidae

The family Ardeidae contains the herons, egrets, and bitterns. Herons and egrets are medium to large wading birds with long necks and legs. Bitterns tend to be shorter necked and more secretive. Members of Ardeidae fly with their necks retracted, unlike other long-necked birds such as storks, ibises, and spoonbills.

- Great blue heron, Ardea herodias (Both) (A – Pacific islands)
- Great egret, Ardea alba
- Intermediate egret, Ardea intermedia
- Cattle egret, Bubulcus ibis (Both)
- Black-crowned night-heron, Nycticorax nycticorax (A)

== Osprey ==
Order: Accipitriformes Family: Pandionidae

Pandionidae is a monotypic family of fish-eating birds of prey. Its single species possesses a very large and powerful hooked beak, strong legs, strong talons, and keen eyesight.

- Osprey, Pandion haliaetus (Both) (A – Pacific islands)

== Hawks, kites, and eagles ==
Order: Accipitriformes Family: Accipitridae

Accipitridae is a family of birds of prey which includes hawks, eagles, kites, harriers, and Old World vultures. These birds have very large powerful hooked beaks for tearing flesh from their prey, strong legs, powerful talons, and keen eyesight.

- Northern harrier, Circus hudsonius (A)
- Black kite, Milvus migrans (A)
- Steller's sea-eagle, Haliaeetus pelagicus (A)
- Red-tailed hawk, Buteo jamaicensis (Both) (A – Pacific islands)
- Rough-legged hawk, Buteo lagopus (A)

== Barn-owls ==
Order: Strigiformes Family: Tytonidae

Owls in the family Tytonidae are medium to large owls with large heads and characteristic heart-shaped faces.

- Barn owl, Tyto alba (Both) (A – Pacific islands)
- Ashy-faced owl, Tyto glaucops (Nav)

== Typical owls ==
Order: Strigiformes Family: Strigidae

Typical or "true" owls are small to large solitary nocturnal birds of prey. They have large forward-facing eyes and ears, a hawk-like beak, and a conspicuous circle of feathers around each eye called a facial disk.

- Short-eared owl, Asio flammeus

== Kingfishers ==
Order: Coraciiformes Family: Alcedinidae

Kingfishers are medium-sized birds with large heads, long, pointed bills, short legs, and stubby tails.

- Belted kingfisher, Megaceryle alcyon (Nav)

== Falcons and caracaras ==
Order: Falconiformes Family: Falconidae

Falconidae is a family of diurnal birds of prey, notably the falcons and caracaras. They differ from hawks, eagles, and kites in that they kill with their beaks instead of their talons.

- American kestrel, Falco sparverius (Nav)
- Merlin, Falco columbarius (A)
- Peregrine falcon, Falco peregrinus (Both) (A – Pacific islands)

== Tyrant flycatchers ==
Order: Passeriformes Family: Tyrannidae

Tyrant flycatchers are Passerine birds which occur throughout North and South America. They superficially resemble the Old World flycatchers, but are more robust and have stronger bills. They do not have the sophisticated vocal capabilities of the songbirds. Most, but not all, are rather plain. As the name implies, most are insectivorous.

- Gray kingbird, Tyrannus dominicensis (Nav)

== Vireos ==
Order: Passeriformes Family: Vireonidae

The vireos are a group of small to medium-sized passerine birds restricted to the New World, though a few other species in the family are found in Asia. They are typically greenish in color and resemble wood-warblers apart from their heavier bills.

- White-eyed vireo, Vireo griseus (Nav) (A)
- Red-eyed vireo, Vireo olivaceus (Nav)
- Black-whiskered vireo, Vireo altiloquus (Nav)

== Jays, crows, magpies, and ravens ==
Order: Passeriformes Family: Corvidae

The family Corvidae includes crows, ravens, jays, choughs, magpies, treepies, nutcrackers, and ground jays. Corvids are above average in size among the Passeriformes, and some of the larger species show high levels of intelligence.

- White-necked crow, Corvus leucognaphalus

== Larks ==
Order: Passeriformes Family: Alaudidae

Larks are small terrestrial birds with often extravagant songs and display flights. Most larks are fairly dull in appearance. Their food is insects and seeds.

- Eurasian skylark, Alauda arvensis (A)

== Reed warblers ==
Order: Passeriformes Family: Acrocephalidae

The members of this family are usually rather large for "warblers". Most are rather plain olivaceous brown above with much yellow to beige below. They are usually found in open woodland, reedbeds, or tall grass. The family occurs mostly in southern to western Eurasia and surroundings, but also ranges far into the Pacific, with some species in Africa.

- Millerbird, Acrocephalus familiaris

== Swallows and martins ==
Order: Passeriformes Family: Hirundinidae

The family Hirundinidae is adapted to aerial feeding. They have a slender streamlined body, long pointed wings, and a short bill with a wide gape. The feet are adapted to perching rather than walking, and the front toes are partially joined at the base.

- Caribbean martin, Progne dominicensis (Nav)
- Barn swallow, Hirundo rustica (Both) (A – Pacific islands)
- Cliff swallow, Petrochelidon pyrrhonota (Nav)
- Cave swallow, Petrochelidon fulva (Nav)

== Starlings and mynas ==
Order: Passeriformes Family: Sturnidae

Starlings and mynas are small to medium-sized Old World passerine birds with strong feet. Their flight is strong and direct and most are very gregarious. Their preferred habitat is fairly open country, and they eat insects and fruit. The plumage of several species is dark with a metallic sheen.

- Common myna, Acridotheres tristis (I)

== Mockingbirds and thrashers ==
Order: Passeriformes Family: Mimidae

The mimids are a family of passerine birds which includes thrashers, mockingbirds, tremblers, and the New World catbirds. These birds are notable for their vocalization, especially their remarkable ability to mimic a wide variety of birds and other sounds heard outdoors. The species tend towards dull grays and browns in their appearance.

- Gray catbird, Dumetella carolinensis (Nav)
- Northern mockingbird, Mimus polyglottos (Both) (A – Pacific islands)

== Thrushes ==
Order: Passeriformes Family: Turdidae

The thrushes are a group of passerine birds that occur mainly but not exclusively in the Old World. They are plump, soft plumaged, small to medium-sized insectivores or sometimes omnivores, often feeding on the ground. Many have attractive songs.

- Eyebrowed thrush, Turdus obscurus (A)

== Waxbills, munias, and allies ==
Order: Passeriformes Family: Estrildidae

The members of this family are small passerine birds native to the Old World tropics. They are gregarious and often colonial seed eaters with short thick but pointed bills. They are all similar in structure and habits, but have wide variation in plumage colors and patterns.

- Scaly-breasted munia, Lonchura punctulata (Nav) (I)

== Old World sparrows ==
Order: Passeriformes Family: Passeridae

Old World sparrows are small passerine birds. In general, sparrows tend to be small plump brownish or grayish birds with short tails and short powerful beaks. Sparrows are seed eaters, but they also consume small insects.

- House sparrow, Passer domesticus (I) (Ex)

== Finches, euphonias, and allies ==
Order: Passeriformes Family: Fringillidae

Finches are seed-eating passerine birds that are small to moderately large and have a strong beak, usually conical and in some species very large. All have twelve tail feathers and nine primaries. These birds have a bouncing flight with alternating bouts of flapping and gliding on closed wings, and most sing well.

- Brambling, Fringilla montifringilla (A)
- Laysan finch, Telespiza cantans (Ex)
- Nihoa finch, Telespiza ultima (En – Nihoa Island)
- House finch, Haemorhous mexicanus (I) (A)
- Common redpoll, Acanthis flammea (A)
- Lesser redpoll, Acanthis cabaret (A)
- Island canary, Serinus canaria (I)

== Longspurs and snow buntings ==
Order: Passeriformes Family: Calcariidae

The Calcariidae are a group of passerine birds that had been traditionally grouped with the New World sparrows, but differ in a number of respects and are usually found in open grassy areas.

- Snow bunting, Plectrophenax nivalis (A)

== Wood-warblers ==
Order: Passeriformes Family: Parulidae

The wood-warblers are a group of small often colorful passerine birds restricted to the New World. Most are arboreal, but some are more terrestrial. Most members of this family are insectivores.

- Ovenbird, Seiurus aurocapilla (Nav)
- Louisiana waterthrush, Parkesia motacilla (Nav)
- Northern waterthrush, Parkesia noveboracensis (Nav)
- Black-and-white warbler, Mniotilta varia (Nav)
- Nashville warbler, Leiothlypis ruficapilla (Nav)
- Mourning warbler, Geothlypis philadelphia (Nav)
- Common yellowthroat, Geothlypis trichas (Nav)
- American redstart, Setophaga ruticilla (Nav)
- Cape May warbler, Setophaga tigrina (Nav)
- Northern parula, Setophaga americana (Nav)
- Black-throated blue warbler, Setophaga caerulescens (Nav)
- Palm warbler, Setophaga palmarum (Nav)
- Pine warbler, Setophaga pinus (Nav)
- Prairie warbler, Setophaga discolor (Nav)
- Black-throated green warbler, Setophaga virens (Nav)

== Cardinals and allies ==
Order: Passeriformes Family: Cardinalidae

The cardinals are a family of robust seed-eating birds with strong bills. They are typically associated with open woodland. The sexes usually have distinct plumages.

- Northern cardinal, Cardinalis cardinalis (A)

== Tanagers ==
Order: Passeriformes Family: Thraupidae

The tanagers are a large group of small to medium-sized passerine birds restricted to the New World, mainly in the tropics. Many species are brightly colored. As a family they are omnivorous, but individual species specialize in eating fruits, seeds, insects, or other types of food.

- Bananaquit, Coereba flaveola (Nav)
- Yellow-faced grassquit, Tiaris olivaceus (Nav)
- Black-faced grassquit, Melanospiza bicolor (Nav)
