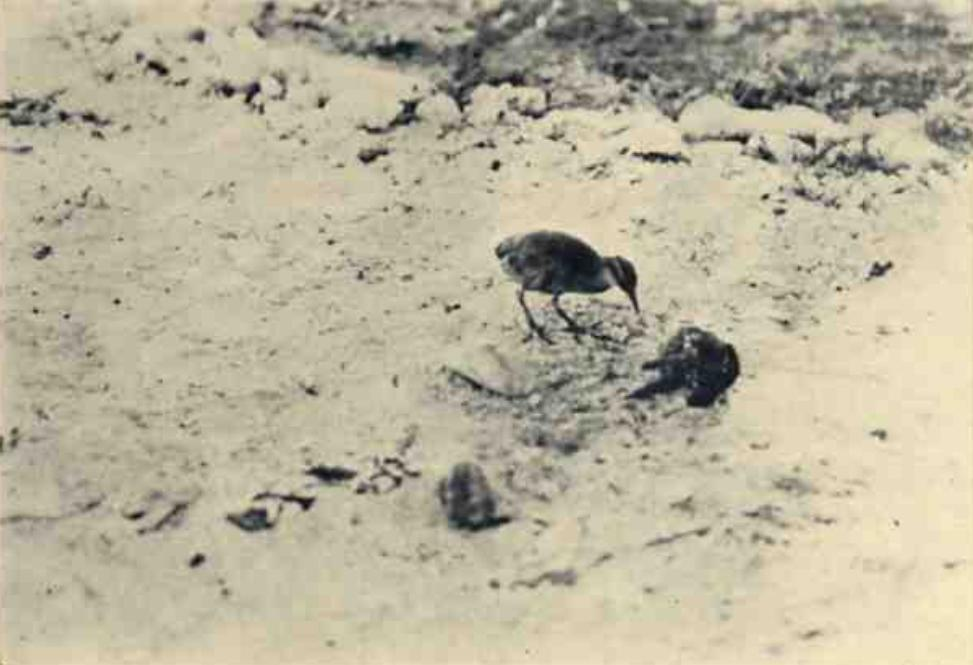
- Photo from a 1936 book

Conservation status
- Extinct (1945) (IUCN 3.1)

Scientific classification
- Kingdom: Animalia
- Phylum: Chordata
- Class: Aves
- Order: Gruiformes
- Family: Rallidae
- Genus: Gallirallus
- Species: †G. wakensis

Binomial name
- †Gallirallus wakensis (Rothschild, 1903)
- The Wake Island rail lived on Wake Island, a 3 islet atoll

Synonyms
- Hypotaenidia wakensis

= Wake Island rail =

Extinct species of bird

The extinct Wake Island rail or Wake rail (Gallirallus wakensis) is an extinct flightless rail and the only native land bird on the Pacific atoll of Wake. It was found on the islands of Wake and Wilkes, and Peale, which is separated from the others by a channel of about 100 metres (330 ft). It was hunted to extinction during World War II. The species was formerly placed in the genus Hypotaenidia.

== Description ==
The adult bird had a length of 22 cm (9 in). The wing spread was between 8.5 and 10 cm (3 and 4 in). The length of the tail was 4.5 cm (2 in). The culmen was between 2.5 and 2.9 cm (1 and 1 in) and the length of the tarsus was 3.3 to 3.7 cm (1 to 1 in). It was closely related to the buff-banded rail (Gallirallus philippensis) from the Philippines, which is able to fly. Genetic evidence indicates that amongst Gallirallus species it is most closely related to the Roviana rail and the buff-banded rail itself. Its appearance was dark greyish brown on the upperparts as well as on the crown, the lores and the cheeks. It was also characterized by ash brown underparts with striking narrow white bars on the belly, the breast, and the flanks. The upper throat and the chin were whitish. A grey superciliary was drawn from the chin over the top of the eyes to the bill. The bill, legs and feet had a brown hue.

== Ecology ==
The ecology of this species is poorly known, though a review published in 2011 has shed more light on its life and subsequent extinction. It was numerous at the time of Lionel Walter Rothschild's first scientific description as Hypotaenidia wakensis in 1903. The Wake Island rail inhabited Cordia subcordata scrubs and fed on molluscs, insects, worms and seeds which it found by digging up leaves and soil with its bill. Since its habitat offered no natural source of fresh water, it is assumed that the bird was able to subsist without drinking.

It was seen on Peale islet of Wake in the late 1930 when the Pan American seaplane port and hotel was built. Some of the last museum specimen collections were taken, between 1935 and 1939. It was observed preying on hermit crabs, and for example of photo of nest with four eggs and one being watched was recorded at this time. A few eggs would be laid in shallow bowl of nest with thick vegetation on the ground, and the eggs had a speckled camouflage pattern.

The breeding period started with courtship and copulations in late July, with actual nesting not taking place until mid-August. The nest itself was a simple saucer-shaped depression on the ground. Under favourable conditions, it may have managed to rear two broods a year. Small groups nested cooperatively, with prolonged parental care and feeding by the adults, most likely so that they could defend their young from predation by hermit crabs (Coenobita) and the Polynesian rat (Rattus exulans), with which it was able to co-exist. When ornithologist Alexander Wetmore observed the species in 1923, he described it as very curious, but quick to flee into cover when disturbed. Its call consisted of a gentle cluck or a low chattering sound.

== Extinction ==
The Wake Island rail is classified as extinct. Its inability to fly and the island's geographic isolation, combined with the bird's inquisitiveness and lack of fear of humans, made it an easy victim of over-hunting. It is now known that the extinction event occurred specifically between 1942 and 1945. This was a direct result of the presence of thousands of starving Japanese troops stranded on the island after a U.S. blockade of the island took place as a direct result of the Japanese invasion and occupation of Wake Island in December 1941, in addition combined with the inevitable habitat destruction resulting from military altercations and extensive aerial bombardment by the Japanese and U.S. during World War II.

The extinction prematurely ended scientific study of the bird, resulting in a scarcity of samples, photographs, and scientific papers. By the early 21st century, the number of people who had firsthand encounters with the bird was also declining.

== Comparable species ==
The Wake island rail is not the only flightless bird on a remote island. For example, the Inaccessible Island rail in the South Atlantic has caused similar questions about its origins.

== See also ==
- Inaccessible Island rail (another rail on a remote island)
- Barred rail (another rail common in the Pacific islands)
- List of birds of the United States Minor Outlying Islands
