= United States Minor Outlying Islands =

U.S. statistical designation of small islands

- Flag
- Motto: "In God We Trust" (official); "E Pluribus Unum" (Latin) (traditional); "Out of Many, One"
- Anthem: "The Star-Spangled Banner"
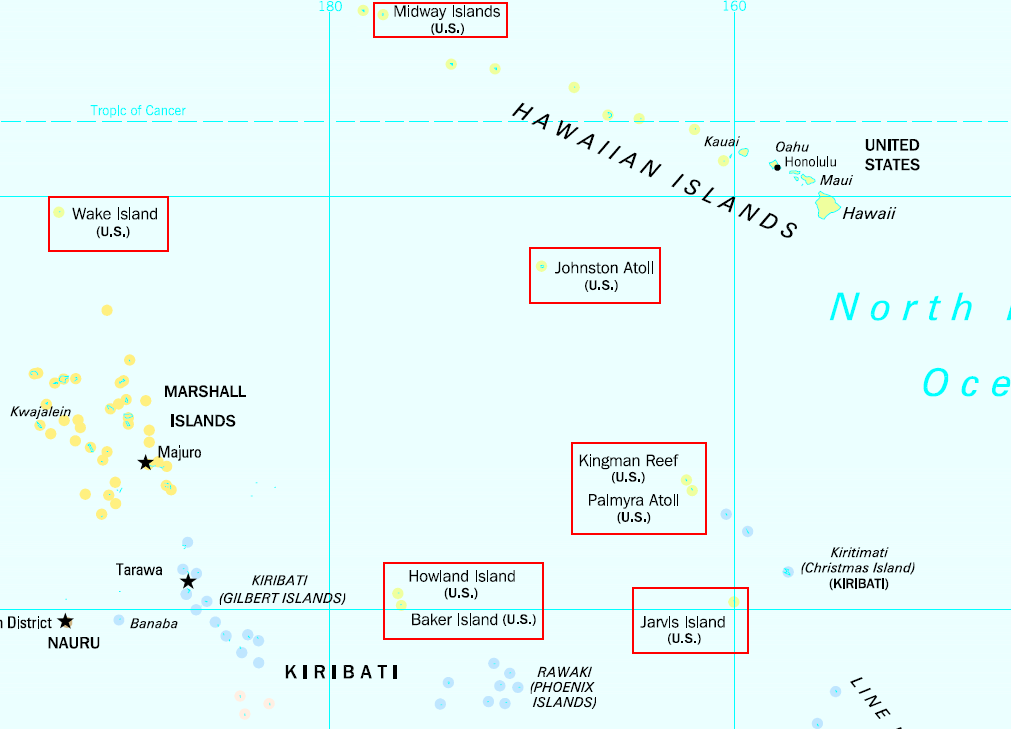
- Locations of the United States Minor Outlying Islands in the Pacific Ocean; Navassa Island is not located on this map.
- Administrative center: Washington, D.C., U.S.
- Largest village: Wake Island
- National language: English

Government
  - President: Donald Trump (R)

Area
  - Total: 49.26 km^{2} (19.02 sq mi) (unranked)
  - Water (%): 88.6

Population
  - 2009 estimate: 300 (232nd)
  - 2000 census: 316
- GDP (PPP): estimate
  - Per capita: $46,381^{a} (6th)
- Currency: United States dollar (US$) (USD)
- Time zone: UTC−12 to -11, −10, −5, +12
- ISO 3166 code: UM
- Internet TLD: .us ^{b}
- 1. 2000 estimate 2. .um was retired in 2007.

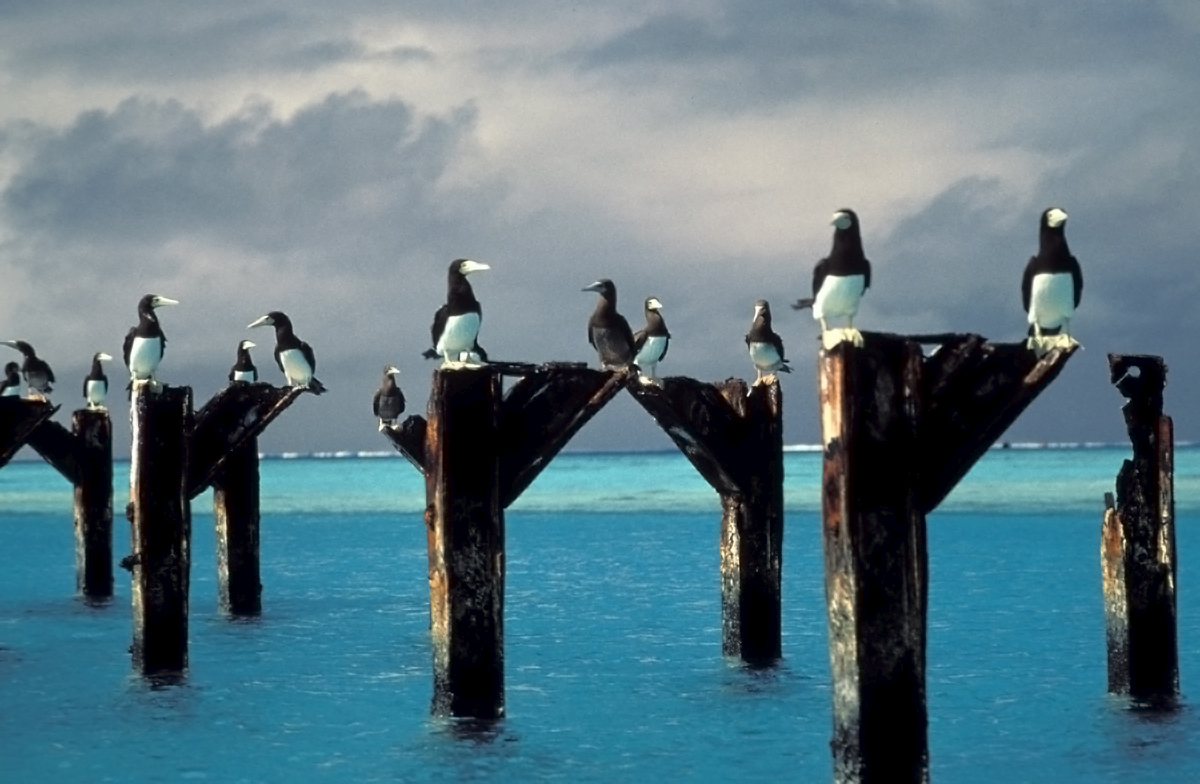
Brown boobies atop pier posts at Johnston Atoll, September 2005

The United States Minor Outlying Islands is a statistical designation applying to the minor outlying islands and groups of islands that comprise eight United States insular areas and territories in the Pacific Ocean (Baker Island, Howland Island, Jarvis Island, Johnston Atoll, Kingman Reef, Midway Atoll, Palmyra Atoll, and Wake Island) and one in the Caribbean Sea (Navassa Island).

It is defined by the International Organization for Standardization's ISO 3166-1 code. The entry code is ISO 3166-2:UM.

While the islands scattered across Polynesia and Micronesia are relatively small, they are strategically important and are rich in history and nature. The nearly barren Howland is famous for being the island renowned American pilot Amelia Earhart intended to land on before she vanished during her round-the-world flight in 1937. Wake, home to an extinct flightless bird, was the site of a pitched World War II battle in 1941, and was an essential stopover for aircraft transiting the Pacific in the mid-20th century. Likewise, Midway Atoll is home to many corals and birds and was also the center of a major battle of WWII, which helped turn the tide of the Pacific War. Other islands are rich in unique biodiversity, such as Palmyra, the site of a WWII base. Johnston Atoll was a famous island for its Cold War base, when it was expanded and used to destroy chemical weapon stockpiles; it was also the site of a nuclear accident. Johnston was heavily modified with land expansion, while others are nearly untouched nature reserves.

== History ==
In 1936, a colonization program began to settle Americans on Baker, Howland, and Jarvis islands. All were evacuated in 1942 due to World War II.

The International Organization for Standardization (ISO) introduced the term "United States Minor Outlying Islands" in 1986. From 1974 until 1986, five of the islands (Baker Island, Howland Island, Jarvis Island, Palmyra Atoll, and Kingman Reef) were grouped under the term United States Miscellaneous Pacific Islands, with ISO 3166 code PU. The code of Midway Atoll was MI, the code of Johnston Atoll was JT, and the code of Wake Island was WK. Before 1986, Navassa Island, along with several small islands in the Caribbean Sea that are no longer under U.S. sovereignty, were grouped under the term United States Miscellaneous Caribbean Islands, with FIPS country code BQ.

The populated Stewart Islands, called Sikaiana and effectively controlled by the Solomon Islands, are not included in official lists of U.S. Minor Outlying Islands. In 1856, the Kingdom of Hawaii Privy Council and King Kamehameha IV voted to accept their voluntary cession. The Kingdom later became the Republic of Hawaii, all of which was annexed by the United States in 1898. In 1959, the resulting federal U.S. Territory of Hawaii, excluding only Palmyra Atoll and Midway Atoll, became a U.S. state. Residents of the Stewart Islands, who are Polynesian like the native Hawaiians rather than Melanesian, claimed to be citizens of the United States since the Stewart Islands were given to King Kamehameha IV in 1856 and were part of Hawaii at the time of the United States annexation in 1898. The U.S. federal and Hawaii state governments informally accept the recent claim of the Solomon Islands over the Stewart Islands, and the United States makes no official claim of sovereignty.

== Overview ==
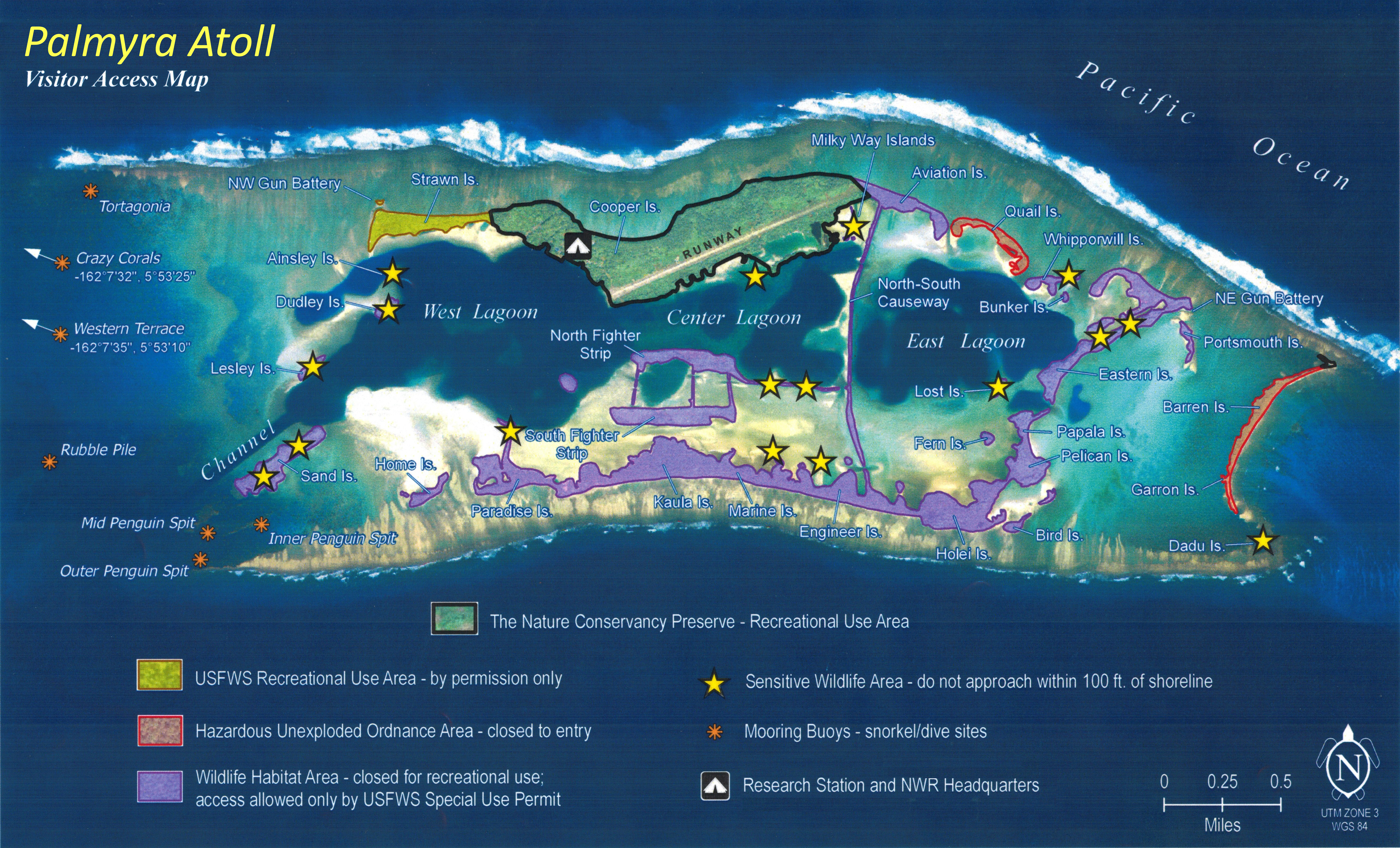
Visitor map for Palmyra Atoll

Except for Palmyra Atoll, all of these islands are unincorporated unorganized territories of the United States. Currently, none of the islands have any known permanent residents. However, military personnel, U.S. Fish and Wildlife Service personnel, and temporarily stationed scientific and research staff are posted to some islands. The 2000 census counted 315 people on Johnston Atoll and 1 person on Wake Island. The Territory of Palmyra Atoll is an incorporated territory, separated in 1959 from the rest of the former incorporated Territory of Hawaii when Hawaii became a state.

There has been no recorded modern Indigenous population, except at the 1940 census. During the late 2010s, the U.S. military began reinvesting in the airfield and other assets on Wake Island.

The islands are grouped for statistical convenience. They are neither administered collectively nor share a single cultural or political history beyond being uninhabited islands under the sovereignty of the United States. They are all outside the customs territory of the United States and have no customs duties. Except for Midway Atoll, the Pacific islands are surrounded by large exclusive economic zones and are within the bounds of the Pacific Islands Heritage Marine National Monument.

They are collectively represented by the ISO 3166-1 alpha-2 code UM. The individual islands have ISO 3166-2 numerical codes.

The Internet country code top-level domain (ccTLD) ".um" has historically been assigned to the islands; however, the .um ccTLD was retired in January 2007.

Most of the U.S. Minor Outlying Islands islands are closed to the public. Visitors to islands such as Jarvis Island need a permit. Palmyra Atoll is open to the public, but there is no easy way to reach it.

== Islands and atolls ==
Atoll or island	Island area (km^{2})	Lagoon (km^{2})	Coordinates	NWR established	Acquired	FIPS Code (Note: Each island (except for Bajo Nuevo Bank and Serranilla Bank) has a unique FIPS (INCITS) code treating it as a county-equivalent for statistical purposes; "74" is the state-level code for the U.S. Minor Outlying Islands.)	GEC (Note: GEC stands for "Geopolitical Entities and Codes", a coding system superseding the FIPS 10-4 codes; the codes (such as FQ for Baker Island) treat each island as if it were a country.)	GENC (Note: GENC stands for "Geopolitical Entities, Names, and Codes", an ISO 3166-based coding system superseding the former GEC.)
North Pacific Ocean, Northwestern Hawaiian Islands
Midway Atoll	6.2	40	28°13′N 177°22′W	April 22, 1988	August 28, 1867	74300	MQ	QM
North Pacific Ocean, scattered isolated islands
Wake Island (Note: Claimed by the Marshall Islands.)	6.5	6	19°18′N 166°38′E	January 16, 2009	January 17, 1899	74450	WQ	QW
Johnston Atoll	2.6	130	16°45′N 169°31′W	June 29, 1926	September 6, 1859	74200	JQ	XU
North Pacific Ocean, Northern Line Islands
Kingman Reef	0.01	76	6°24′N 162°24′W	January 18, 2001	1860 Feb 8	74250	KQ	XM
Palmyra Atoll (Note: Previously claimed by Hawaii when independent. Palmyra Atoll was officially a part of the Hawaii Territory until 1959, when Hawaii became a U.S. state.)	3.9	15	5°53′N 162°05′W	January 18, 2001	1912 Feb 21	74400	LQ	XL
North Pacific Ocean, Northern Phoenix Islands
Howland Island	2.6	–	0°48′N 176°37′W	June 27, 1974	October 28, 1856	74100	HQ	XH
Baker Island	2.1	–	0°12′N 176°29′W	June 27, 1974	October 28, 1856	74050	FQ	XB
South Pacific Ocean, Central Line Islands
Jarvis Island	5.0	–	0°22′S 160°01′W	June 27, 1974	October 28, 1856	74150	DQ	XQ
Caribbean Sea, Greater Antilles
Navassa Island (Note: Claimed by Haiti.)	5.4	–	18°24′N 75°01′W	December 3, 1999	October 31, 1858	74350	BQ	XV
Caribbean Sea, scattered isolated islets
Bajo Nuevo Bank (Note: Administered by Colombia, also claimed by Jamaica, not included in the ISO list of territories; its area is not included in the total.)	0.02	155	15°53′N 78°38′W		November 22, 1869	(none)	(none)	(none)
Serranilla Bank (Note: Administered by Colombia, also claimed by Honduras and Jamaica, not included in the ISO list of territories; its area is not included in the total.)	0.02	1200	15°50′N 79°50′W		September 8, 1879; September 13, 1880	(none)	(none)	(none)
U.S. Minor Outlying Islands	34.3	267						

== Transportation ==
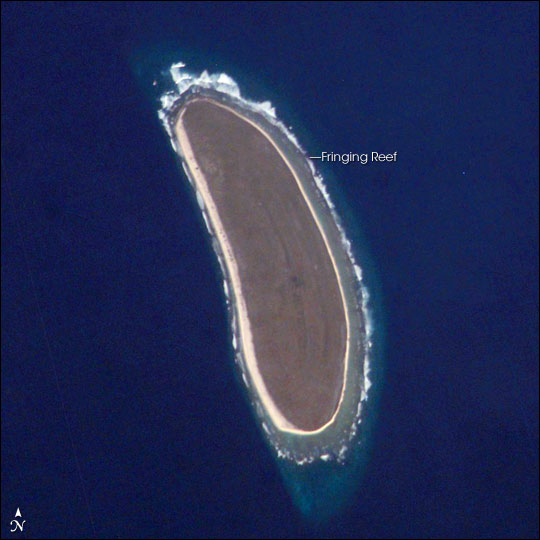
Howland Island

=== Airports ===
Airports in the United States Minor Outlying Islands provide critical emergency landing points across the vast Pacific Ocean for all aircraft types, allow for important military presence in key strategic zones, and have limited scheduled commercial services. The following is a list of island airports with ICAO (IATA) codes:

- PLPA: Palmyra (Cooper) Airport, Cooper Island, Palmyra Atoll
- PMDY (MDY): Henderson Field, Sand Island, Midway Atoll
- PWAK (AWK): Wake Island Airfield, Wake Island

Other airports include:

- Johnston Atoll Airport, Johnston Atoll (Formerly PJON/JON): The airport was built during WWII and saw significant commercial traffic during the second half of the 20th century. However, it was abandoned in 2003.
- Kamakaiwi Field: Howland Island (from 1937 to about 1945)
- Kingman Reef: The lagoon was used as a halfway station between Hawaii and American Samoa by Pan American Airways for flying boats in 1937 and 1938.

=== Seaports ===
Three of the islands are listed with ports in the World Port Index, with World Port Number:

- 56325 JOHNSTON ATOLL: Johnston Atoll
- 56328 MIDWAY ISLAND: Midway Atoll
- 56330 WAKE ISLAND: Wake Island
- not listed WEST LAGOON: Palmyra Atoll

Baker Island, Howland Island, and Jarvis Island each have small boat landing places. Kingman Reef and Navassa Island only have offshore anchorages.

== Flora and fauna ==
- List of birds of the United States Minor Outlying Islands
- List of mammals of the United States Minor Outlying Islands

== See also ==
- Guano Islands Act
- Insular area
- Insular Cases
- List of airports by ICAO code: P
- List of territorial disputes
- New Zealand outlying islands
- Outlying Islands, Hong Kong
