= Territorial evolution of the United States =

Animated map of the territorial evolution of the United States

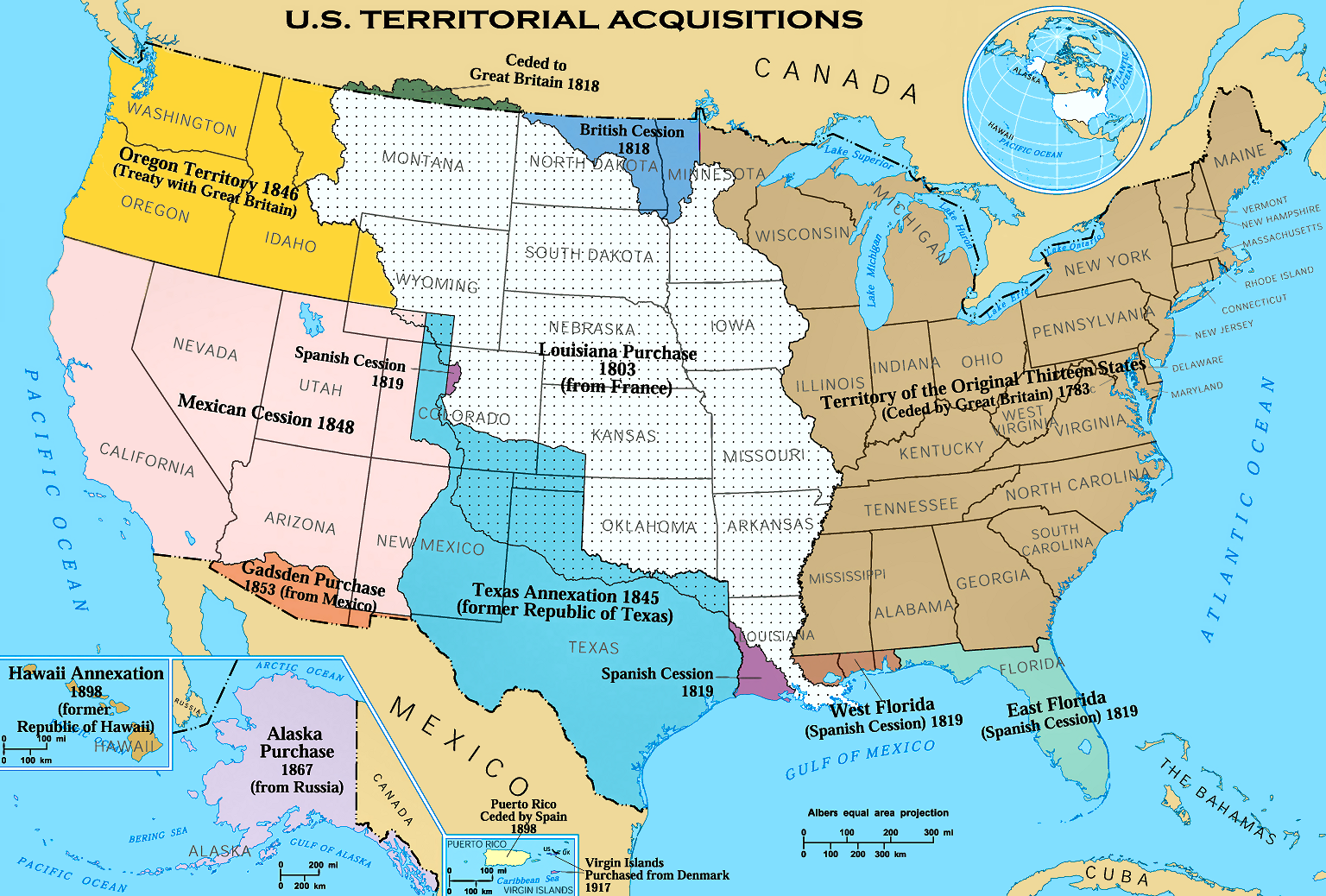
Territorial expansion of the United States; dotted area is the Louisiana Purchase.

The United States of America was formed after thirteen British colonies in North America declared independence from the British Empire on July 4, 1776. In the Lee Resolution, passed by the Second Continental Congress two days prior, the colonies resolved that they were free and independent states. The union was formalized in the Articles of Confederation, which came into force on March 1, 1781, after being ratified by all 13 states. Their independence was recognized by Great Britain in the Treaty of Paris of 1783, which concluded the American Revolutionary War. This extended the borders of the new nation westward past the Proclamation Line to the Mississippi River. This land was organized into territories and then states, though there remained some conflict with the sea-to-sea grants claimed by some of the original colonies. In time, these grants were ceded to the federal government.

The first great expansion of the country came with the Louisiana Purchase of 1803, which doubled the country's territory, although the southeastern border with Spanish Florida was the subject of much dispute until it and Spanish claims to the Oregon Country were ceded to the US in 1821. The Oregon Country gave the United States access to the Pacific Ocean, though it was shared for a time with the United Kingdom. The annexation of the Republic of Texas in 1845 led directly to the Mexican–American War, after which the victorious United States obtained the northern half of Mexico's territory, including what became the state of California.

As the country expanded westward, the question of slavery became increasingly prominent, with debate over whether new territories would permit it, and events such as the Missouri Compromise and Bleeding Kansas reflecting that tension. Southern state governments proclaimed secession in 1860 and 1861, forming the Confederate States of America. The American Civil War ended in the defeat of the Confederacy in 1865 and the eventual readmission of the southern states to the Congress.

The United States began expanding beyond North America in 1856 with the passage of the Guano Islands Act, causing many small and uninhabited, but economically important, islands in the Caribbean Sea and the Pacific Ocean to be claimed. Most of these claims were eventually abandoned, largely because of competing claims from other countries. The Pacific expansion culminated in the annexation of Hawaii in 1898, after the overthrow of its government five years previously. Alaska, the last major acquisition in North America, was purchased from Russia in 1867. Support for the independence of Cuba from the Spanish Empire, and the sinking of the USS Maine, led to the Spanish–American War in 1898, in which the United States gained Puerto Rico, Guam, and the Philippines, and occupied Cuba for several years. American Samoa was acquired in 1900 after the end of the Second Samoan Civil War. The United States purchased the U.S. Virgin Islands from Denmark in 1917.

Following the war, many islands were entrusted to the U.S. by the United Nations, and while the Northern Mariana Islands became a U.S. territory, the Marshall Islands, Federated States of Micronesia, and Palau emerged from the trust territory as independent nations. The last major international change was the acquisition in 1904, and return to Panama in 1979, of the Panama Canal Zone, an unincorporated US territory which controlled the Panama Canal. The final transfer of formal control over the region to Panama was completed in 1999.

States have generally retained their initial borders once established. Only three states (Kentucky, Maine, and West Virginia) have been created directly from area belonging to another state (although at the time of admission, Vermont agreed to a monetary payment for New York to relinquish its claim); all of the other states were created from federal territories or from acquisitions. Four states (Louisiana, Missouri, Nevada, and Pennsylvania) have expanded substantially by acquiring additional federal territory after their initial admission to the Union. In 1912, Arizona was the last state established in the contiguous United States. In 1959, Hawaii became the 50th and most recent state admitted.

== 1776–1784 (American Revolution) ==
Date	Event (Note: Even though there were borders drawn as far as the Mississippi River, the early United States was only settled along the east coast. As the states were surveyed, these lines were solidified, though often missing their intended mark. By the time the country was surveying its western acquisitions in the mid-19th century, the process had improved and was being conducted through the United States General Land Office; the western borders were rarely controversial. Border surveys are given their own entry in this list if they were performed east of the Mississippi River, involved legislation, or were otherwise notable; the rest are detailed in footnotes in the relevant statehood or cession entries.)	Change map
July 4, 1776	Thirteen colonies of the Kingdom of Great Britain in North America collectively declared their independence as the United States of America, (Note: The boundaries of the country would be defined in the Treaty of Paris of 1783, with the general claim being everything north of the Floridas, south of Quebec, and east of the Mississippi River.) (Note: United States Declaration of Independence, 1 Stat. 1) though several colonies had already individually declared independence: The Colony of Connecticut, becoming the State of Connecticut; (Note: The Connecticut General Assembly adopted the name "State of Connecticut" during their session beginning October 10, 1776.); The Counties of New Castle, Kent, and Sussex, upon Delaware, commonly known as the Lower Counties on Delaware, which was Delaware Colony before their declaration of independence on June 15, 1776; The Province of Georgia, becoming the State of Georgia; (Note: Georgia formally became the "State of Georgia" with the adoption of their constitution on February 5, 1777.); The Province of Maryland, becoming the State of Maryland; (Note: Maryland formally became the "State of Maryland" with the adoption of their constitution around November 11, 1776.); The Province of Massachusetts Bay, becoming the State of Massachusetts Bay; (Note: The Massachusetts Bay House of Representatives adopted the name "State of Massachusetts Bay" on December 7, 1776.); The State of New Hampshire, (Note: New Hampshire formally adopted the name "State of New Hampshire" on September 11, 1776. (Note: An act to adopt and take the name, stile, and title of State, in liew of Colony, in New Hampshire, 1776 N.H. Laws chp. 1, p. 37)) which was the Province of New Hampshire before their declaration of independence on June 15, 1776; The Province of New Jersey, becoming the State of New Jersey; (Note: New Jersey formally adopted the name "State of New Jersey" on September 20, 1777. (Note: An act to ascertain the punishment for high treason, and to establish the word State instead of Colony in commissions, writs, and other process; and for other purposes therein mentioned, 1777 N.J. Laws chp. 41, p. 92)); The Province of New York, becoming the State of New York; (Note: New York formally became the "State of New York" with the adoption of their constitution on April 20, 1777; the New York Provincial Congress adopted the name "Convention of the Representatives of the State of New-York" on July 10, 1776.); The Province of North Carolina, becoming the State of North Carolina; (Note: North Carolina formally became the "State of North Carolina" with the adoption of their constitution on December 18, 1776.); The Province of Pennsylvania, becoming the State of Pennsylvania; (Note: Pennsylvania was first formally referred to as the "State of Pennsylvania" on July 25, 1776.); The State of Rhode Island and Providence Plantations, (Note: Rhode Island formally adopted the name "State of Rhode Island and Providence Plantations" on July 20, 1776.) commonly known as Rhode Island, which was the Colony of Rhode Island and Providence Plantations before declaring independence on May 4, 1776; (Note: An act repealing an act entitled "An act for the effectual securing to His Majesty the allegiance of his subjects in this his Colony and Dominion of Rhode Island and Providence Plantations;" and altering the form of commissions, of all writs and processes in the courts, and of the oaths prescribed by law, May 1776 R.I. Acts & Resolves p. 22); The Province of South Carolina, becoming the State of South Carolina; (Note: South Carolina formally became the "State of South Carolina" with the adoption of their constitution on March 19, 1778.); The Colony of Virginia, becoming the Commonwealth of Virginia. (Note: Virginia formally became the "Commonwealth of Virginia" with the adoption of their constitution on June 29, 1776.); The capital was not specifically established; at the time, the Continental Congress met in Philadelphia. Many states had only vaguely defined borders at the time of independence, with only the far eastern borders having been fully mapped. The borders of North Carolina were particularly poorly surveyed, its border with South Carolina having been done in several pieces, none of which truly matched the spirit of the charter, and its border with Virginia veered several miles north of ideal. Virginia claimed the vast northwest across the Ohio River, and Connecticut, Massachusetts Bay, and New York also claimed areas west of their settled borders, overlapping with Virginia's claim. Some colonies had historical "sea to sea" grants, but British claims west of the Mississippi were renounced in favor of the claims of France to Louisiana in the 1763 Treaty of Paris. The Royal Proclamation of 1763 limited the Thirteen Colonies to settlement east of the Appalachian Mountains, but the colonies that became states continued to claim territory west of this line. The Quebec Act of 1774 granted territory between the Great Lakes, Mississippi River, and the Ohio River (which partly overlapped these continued claims) to the newly British colony of Quebec, a grievance mentioned in the Declaration of Independence and considered one of the Intolerable Acts. The entirety of the new United States was claimed by Great Britain, including Machias Seal Island and North Rock, two small islands off the northeast coast which remain disputed up to the present.	Map of the change to the United States in central North America on July 4, 1776
September 21, 1776	The Counties of New Castle, Kent, and Sussex, upon Delaware enacted a constitution, becoming the Delaware State. (Note: Sources disagree on whether the constitution took effect on September 20 or September 21.)	Map of the change to the United States in central North America on September 21, 1776
September 28, 1776	The State of Pennsylvania enacted a constitution, becoming the Commonwealth of Pennsylvania.	Map of the change to the United States in central North America on September 28, 1776
December 20, 1776	To avoid British forces who were advancing on Philadelphia, the Continental Congress began meeting in Baltimore.	Map of the change to the United States in central North America on December 20, 1776
January 17, 1777	The northeastern region of New York, known as the New Hampshire Grants, declared independence as New Connecticut. (Note: Sources disagree on whether this formally occurred on January 15 or January 17.)	Map of the change to the international disputes involving the United States in central North America on January 17, 1777
March 4, 1777	The Continental Congress returned to Philadelphia after the threat to it by British forces ended.	Map of the change to the United States in central North America on March 4, 1777
June 4, 1777	New Connecticut was renamed Vermont.	Map of the change to the international disputes involving the United States in central North America on June 4, 1777
September 27, 1777	The Continental Congress fled Philadelphia after the American defeat at the Battle of Brandywine, and briefly met in Lancaster, Pennsylvania.	Map of the change to the United States in central North America on September 27, 1777
September 30, 1777	The Continental Congress continued to move away from Philadelphia, settling in York, Pennsylvania.	Map of the change to the United States in central North America on September 30, 1777
June 11, 1778	Vermont claimed what was called the "East Union", consisting of some towns in New Hampshire (Note: The New Hampshire towns petitioning to join Vermont were: Apthorp (now Littleton), Bath, Canaan, Cardigan (now Orange), Cornish, Dresden (now part of Hanover), Enfield, Franconia, Gunthwaite (now Lisbon), Haverhill, Landaff, Lebanon, Lyman, Lyme, Orford, and Piermont.) that petitioned to join with Vermont, out of concern that their state was focusing too much on its coastal region.	Map of the change to the international disputes involving the United States in central North America on June 11, 1778
July 2, 1778	The Continental Congress returned to Philadelphia following British withdrawal.	Map of the change to the United States in central North America on July 2, 1778
October 21, 1778	Under pressure from the Continental Congress, Vermont rescinded the annexation of the East Union; the legislature declared on February 12, 1779, that the East Union should be considered null from its beginning.	Map of the change to the international disputes involving the United States in central North America on October 21, 1778
October 25, 1780	The State of Massachusetts Bay enacted a constitution, becoming the Commonwealth of Massachusetts.	Map of the change to the United States in central North America on October 25, 1780
March 1, 1781	The Articles of Confederation entered into force. The British Province of Quebec was invited to join, but did not do so.	no change to map
April 5, 1781	Vermont again claimed an East Union, consisting of some towns in New Hampshire (Note: The New Hampshire towns petitioning to join Vermont were: Acworth, Alstead, Bath, Cardigan (now Orange), Charlestown, Chesterfield, Claremont, Cornish, Croydon, Dorchester, Dresden, Franconia, "Gilsom" (likely Gilsum), Grafton, Grantham, Gunthwaite (now Lisbon), Hanover, Haverhill, Hinsdale, Landaff, Lancaster, Lebanon, "Leinster" (possibly Lempster), Lincoln, Lyman, Lyme, Marlow, Newport, Piermont, Plainfield, Richmond, Saville (now Sunapee), Surry, Walpole, and Westmoreland.) that wished to join with Vermont, more than during the first attempt in 1778.	Map of the change to the international disputes involving the United States in central North America on April 5, 1781
June 16, 1781	Vermont claimed what was called the "West Union", consisting of some towns in New York, (Note: The New York towns petitioning to join Vermont were: "Black-Creek" (unknown; possibly is or is near Hebron), Cambridge, Fort Edward, Granville, "Greenfield" (unknown; there is a town named Greenfield but it is west of the Hudson River, which was explicitly the western extent of the West Union), Hoosick, Kingsbury, "Little Hoosack" (unknown; presumably near Hoosick), Saratoga, "Scorticook" (possibly Schaghticoke), Skeensborough (now Whitehall), and "Upper-White-Creek" (probably White Creek).) mainly to counterbalance Vermont's attempt at eastward expansion.	Map of the change to the international disputes involving the United States in central North America on June 16, 1781
February 23, 1782	Vermont abandoned its attempts to annex the East Union from New Hampshire and the West Union from New York. (Note: The Supreme Court noted in 1933 that this occurred on February 22, (Note: Vermont v. New Hampshire, 289 U.S. 593, 611 (1933)) but a 1823 printing of the Vermont State Papers indicates it was February 23.)	Map of the change to the international disputes involving the United States in central North America on February 23, 1782
October 29, 1782	The western claim of New York was ceded to the federal government. (Note: New York made the cession on March 1, 1781, and Congress accepted it on October 29, 1782. (Note: JCC 23:694)) New York proclaimed its new western border to be a line drawn south from the western end of Lake Ontario. At its maximum interpretation, the state ceded a claim bounded by Lake Erie, Lake Huron and Lake Michigan on the north; the Illinois, Mississippi, and Tennessee Rivers on the west and south; and the Appalachian Mountains and Pennsylvania on the east. (Note: It is unclear from where this claim came; many sources state that New York had surrendered it, but few elaborate on how it was obtained, beyond some saying it was a cession from the Six Nations.) The cession included the tip of New York north of Pennsylvania, which would be known as the Erie Triangle.	Map of the change to the United States in central North America on October 29, 1782
December 30, 1782	The Congress of the Confederation declared that the region that Connecticut claimed as Westmoreland County was part of Pennsylvania, attempting to end the Pennamite–Yankee War.	Map of the change to the United States in central North America on December 30, 1782
June 30, 1783	The Pennsylvania Mutiny, and the state's refusal to stop it, caused the Congress of the Confederation to leave Philadelphia for Princeton.	Map of the change to the United States in central North America on June 30, 1783
November 26, 1783	The Congress of the Confederation reconvened in Annapolis.	Map of the change to the United States in central North America on November 26, 1783
March 1, 1784	The claim of Virginia northwest of the Ohio River was ceded to the federal government. (Note: Virginia made the cession during the session beginning October 20, 1783, and Congress accepted it on March 1, 1784. (Note: JCC 26:112–117))	Map of the change to the United States in central North America on March 1, 1784
April 1, 1784	Pennsylvania and Virginia agreed to set their border as continuing the Mason–Dixon line to a point five degrees west of the Delaware River, then north. (Note: The agreement was made provisionally on August 31, 1779; approved by Virginia on June 23, 1783; and approved by Pennsylvania on April 1, 1784.)	Map of the change to the United States in central North America on April 1, 1784
May 12, 1784	Great Britain recognized the independence of the United States, ending its claim to the country. (Note: The treaty was signed September 3, 1783, ratified January 14, 1784, and entered into force May 12, 1784. (Note: Definitive Treaty of Peace, with Great Britain, T.S. 104, 8 Stat. 80)) (Note: The treaty established the boundaries of the new country, from the Bay of Fundy: up the "St. Croix River" (which river this referred to was disputed) to its source; north to the height of the land (the "Northwest Angle of Nova Scotia"); along the height of the land to the "northwesternmost Head" of the Connecticut River (which source this referred to was disputed); down that to 45° north; west to the St. Lawrence River; up that to the Great Lakes, through Lake Ontario, the Niagara River, Lake Erie, the Detroit River, Lake St. Clair, the St. Clair River, Lake Huron, and Lake Superior; to "Long Lake" (which lake this referred to was disputed) towards the Lake of the Woods; to the northwest angle of the Lake of the Woods; then west to the Mississippi River. However, the Lake of the Woods was north of the source of the Mississippi River; maps universally show this undefined boundary as a straight line, nearly straight south, between the two points. From there, it followed the Mississippi River down to 31° north; east to the Chattahoochee River; down that to the confluence of the Chattahoochee and Flint rivers; a line from there to the source of the St. Mary's River; then down that to the Atlantic Ocean.) The treaty ended the American Revolutionary War, though military action had largely ended after the Franco-American victory at Yorktown on October 19, 1781. Because of ambiguities and poor knowledge of geography, the treaty was unclear in several areas: The northeastern border was defined as running from the headlands of the St. Croix River, but there were several options for that river.; The northwestern border was defined as a line running west from the northwestern point of the Lake of the Woods to the Mississippi River, but the river's source was south of that; The border extending from Lake Superior towards the Lake of the Woods was poorly defined as starting from "Long Lake", which both sides interpreted to their advantage.; Machias Seal Island and North Rock off the northeast coast, and Sugar Island off the Upper Peninsula of Michigan, remained disputed.; During the Peace of Paris, Great Britain also ceded the Floridas to Spain. During their ownership of West Florida, the British had moved its border north, and the cession to Spain appeared to apply to the full extent of the British colony. However, the British-American treaty granted the extension of West Florida to the United States, where it enlarged the country south to 31° north, (Note: All sources show Georgia enlarging to fill the new borders, but an act in 1798 referred to the federal and Georgia governments having "interfering claims" over the region. (Note: An act for an amicable settlement of limits with the State of Georgia, and authorizing the establishment of a government in the Mississippi Territory, Pub. L. 5–28, 1 Stat. 549)) indicating that only the original, smaller definition of West Florida was to be ceded to Spain.	Map of the change to the United States in central North America on May 12, 1784 Map of the change to the international disputes involving the United States in central North America on May 12, 1784

== 1784–1803 (Organization of territory) ==
Date	Event	Change map
August 23, 1784	A region in the western North Carolina frontier, unhappy with the state's governance over the area, declared independence from the state as the State of Franklin. (Note: There is some confusion over if the state was named Franklin or Frankland, complicated by another attempt at a state in the region using the name Frankland.) Franklin petitioned for statehood, receiving support from seven of the nine states required, (Note: JCC 28:381–383) but would only last a few years.	Map of the change to the United States in central North America on August 23, 1784
November 1, 1784	The Congress of the Confederation moved for a short time to Trenton.	Map of the change to the United States in central North America on November 1, 1784
January 11, 1785	The Congress of the Confederation moved to New York, and would settle there for five years.	Map of the change to the United States in central North America on January 11, 1785
April 19, 1785	The western claim of Massachusetts was ceded to the federal government. (Note: Massachusetts made the cession on November 13, 1784, and Congress accepted it on April 19, 1785. (Note: JCC 28:280–283)) (Note: Massachusetts' ceded claim was a strip west of New York and Pennsylvania stretching to the Mississippi River, bounded by the latitudes of Massachusetts Bay Colony's original charter: on the north by a line west from one league north of Lake Winnipesaukee, and on the south by a line west from Massachusetts' southwest corner.)	Map of the change to the United States in central North America on April 19, 1785
September 14, 1786	The western claim of Connecticut, except for its Western Reserve, was ceded to the federal government. (Note: Connecticut made the cession on May 11, 1786, and Congress accepted it on September 14, 1786. (Note: JCC 31:654–655)) (Note: Connecticut's ceded claim was a strip west of 120 miles west of Pennsylvania (the western border of its Western Reserve) stretching to the Mississippi River, bounded by 41° north and the southern edge of Massachusetts' western claim, roughly 42°2′ north.)	Map of the change to the United States in central North America on September 14, 1786
October 4, 1786	The survey of the Pennsylvania–Virginia border was submitted to Pennsylvania. (Note: This is the date used to consider the border as formally surveyed, as no dates of government approval are known.)	Map of the change to the United States in central North America on October 4, 1786
December 16, 1786	Massachusetts abandoned its claim to western New York. (Note: Agreement entered into by the commissioners, appointed to settle the controversy between the Commonwealth of Massachusetts and the State of New York, respecting lands lying westward of Hudson's River, Jan. 1786 Mass. Acts pp. 460–467)	Map of the change to the United States in central North America on December 16, 1786
July 13, 1787	The region beyond the Ohio River ceded by several states to the federal government was organized as the Territory Northwest of the River Ohio, commonly known as the Northwest Territory. (Note: An ordinance for the government of the territory of the United States North West of the river Ohio, JCC 32:334)	Map of the change to the United States in central North America on July 13, 1787
July 21, 1787	The survey of the Massachusetts–New York border was completed. (Note: Massachusetts noted in a resolve passed on November 21, 1787, that the surveyors agreed on their report on July 21, 1787. (Note: Resolve directing the secretary to record the agreement entered into by the agents of this commonwealth, and the State of New-York, Oct. 1787 Mass. Acts chp. 101, p. 794))	Map of the change to the United States in central North America on July 21, 1787
August 9, 1787	The western claim of South Carolina was ceded to the federal government. (Note: South Carolina made the cession on March 8, 1787, (Note: An act to authorize the delegates of this state in Congress to convey to the United States in Congress assembled, all the rights of this state to the territory herein described, 1787 S.C. Acts no. 1346, p. 5) and Congress accepted it on August 9, 1787. (Note: JCC 33:466–477)) However, it was a result of inaccurate geography, and South Carolina never actually held claim to the region: the claim was of a strip between the border of North Carolina and the source of the Tugaloo River but, unknown at the time, the river originated in North Carolina. The eastern part of this cession would be given to Georgia in 1802, despite Georgia technically already having claim to the region.	Map of the change to the United States in central North America on August 9, 1787
December 7, 1787	Delaware became the first state to ratify the United States Constitution.	no change to map
December 12, 1787	Pennsylvania became the second state to ratify the Constitution.	no change to map
December 18, 1787	New Jersey became the third state to ratify the Constitution.	no change to map
January 2, 1788	Georgia became the fourth state to ratify the Constitution.	no change to map
January 9, 1788	Connecticut became the fifth state to ratify the Constitution.	no change to map
February 6, 1788	Massachusetts became the sixth state to ratify the Constitution.	no change to map
April 28, 1788	Maryland became the seventh state to ratify the Constitution.	no change to map
May 23, 1788	South Carolina became the eighth state to ratify the Constitution.	no change to map
June 21, 1788	New Hampshire became the ninth state to ratify the Constitution; at this point, the Constitution became the active governing document of those nine states having ratified it.	no change to map
June 25, 1788	Virginia became the tenth state to ratify the Constitution.	no change to map
July 26, 1788	New York became the eleventh state to ratify the Constitution.	no change to map
February 1789	John Sevier, governor of the State of Franklin, pledged allegiance to North Carolina at the February term of the Greene County Court, effectively ending the claimed independence of Franklin.	Map of the change to the United States in central North America in February 1789
August 7, 1789	The Northwest Territory was reorganized under the Constitution. (Note: An act to provide for the government of the Territory Northwest of the river Ohio, Pub. L. 1–8, 1 Stat. 50)	no change to map
September 29, 1789	The survey of the New York–Pennsylvania border was approved by Pennsylvania. (Note: No date of approval by New York is known.) (Note: An act to establish and confirm the boundary line between this state and the State of New-York, 1789 Pa. Laws chp. 76, p. 177)	Map of the change to the United States in central North America on September 29, 1789
November 21, 1789	North Carolina became the twelfth state to ratify the Constitution.	no change to map
April 2, 1790	The claim of North Carolina west of the Great Smoky Mountains was ceded to the federal government. (Note: North Carolina made the cession on December 22, 1789, and the federal government accepted it on April 2, 1790. (Note: An act to accept a cession of the claims of the state of North Carolina to a certain district of western territory, Pub. L. 1–6, 1 Stat. 106))	Map of the change to the United States in central North America on April 2, 1790
May 26, 1790	The region recently ceded by North Carolina was organized as the Territory South of the River Ohio, commonly known as the Southwest Territory. (Note: An act for the government of the territory of the United States, south of the river Ohio, Pub. L. 1–14, 1 Stat. 123)	Map of the change to the United States in central North America on May 26, 1790
May 29, 1790	Rhode Island became the thirteenth state to ratify the Constitution.	no change to map
October 10, 1790	The survey of the New York–Erie Triangle border was completed. (Note: Surveyor Andrew Ellicott wrote several letters on October 11, 1790, referring to his work having been completed the previous day, but no dates of government approval are known.)	Map of the change to the United States in central North America on October 10, 1790
December 6, 1790	Philadelphia was established as the capital for ten years until a federal district could be prepared. (Note: An act for establishing the temporary and permanent seat of the government of the United States, Pub. L. 1–28, 1 Stat. 130; An act to amend "An act for establishing the temporary and permanent seat of the Government of the United States," Pub. L. 1–17, 1 Stat. 214)	Map of the change to the United States in central North America on December 6, 1790
March 4, 1791	Vermont, which had been considered part of New York despite acting independently since 1777, was admitted as the fourteenth state. (Note: Vermont ratified the United States Constitution on January 10, 1791.) (Note: The New York–Vermont border was Lake Champlain, the Poultney River, then south following borders of townships.) (Note: An act for the admission of the State of Vermont into this Union, Pub. L. 1–10, 1 Stat. 191)	Map of the change to the United States in central North America on March 4, 1791
March 30, 1791	A federal district (Note: The district did not have a formal name; in September 1791, the commissioners in charge of planning the city would term it the "Territory of Columbia".) intended to house the government by 1800 was formed from areas ceded by Maryland and Virginia, (Note: Maryland made the cession on December 23, 1788, (Note: An act to cede to Congress a district of ten miles square in this state for the seat of the government of the United States, Nov. 1788 Md. Laws chp. 46, p. 1516) and, after the district's borders were set, formally ceded the specific parcel on December 19, 1791. (Note: An act concerning the Territory of Columbia and the City of Washington, Nov. 1791 Md. Laws chp. 45, p. 1633) Virginia made the cession on December 3, 1789.) consisting of a diamond, 10 miles on each side, with its southern tip at Jones Point and straddling the Potomac River.	Map of the change to the United States in central North America on March 30, 1791
March 3, 1792	The Erie Triangle was purchased by Pennsylvania from the federal government. (Note: The act approving the sale was approved on January 3, 1792. (Note: An act for carrying into effect a contract between the United States and the State of Pennsylvania, Pub. L. 2–4, 1 Stat. 229) President George Washington presented the deed to Pennsylvania on March 3, 1792, and most sources use this date for the formal transfer; however, some use April 23.)	Map of the change to the United States in central North America on March 3, 1792
June 1, 1792	The western half of Virginia was admitted as the fifteenth state, the Commonwealth of Kentucky. (Note: Virginia agreed to cede the territory to the federal government on December 18, 1789. (Note: Compact and boundary with Kentucky, Va. Code § 1-307)) (Note: The new Kentucky–Virginia border was, from the south: north along the Cumberland Mountains and Pine Mountain to the Russell Fork; northeast to the Tug Fork; then down that to the Big Sandy River and to the Ohio River.) (Note: An act declaring the consent of Congress, that a new state be formed within the jurisdiction of the Commonwealth of Virginia, and admitted into this Union, by the name of the State of Kentucky, Pub. L. 1–4, 1 Stat. 189)	Map of the change to the United States in central North America on June 1, 1792
June 12, 1792	The Delaware State enacted a new constitution, becoming the State of Delaware.	Map of the change to the United States in central North America on June 12, 1792
January 1, 1793	The survey of the federal district's boundaries was completed.	Map of the change to the United States in central North America on January 1, 1793
April 25, 1796	The northern half of West Florida was ceded by Spain, resolving the dispute over the region. (Note: The treaty was signed October 27, 1795, ratified March 7, 1796, and entered into force April 25, 1796. (Note: Pinckney's Treaty, with Spain, T.S. 325, 8 Stat. 138))	Map of the change to the international disputes involving the United States in central North America on April 25, 1796
June 1, 1796	The Southwest Territory was admitted as the sixteenth state, Tennessee. (Note: An act for the admission of the State of Tennessee into the Union, Pub. L. 4–47, 1 Stat. 491)	Map of the change to the United States in central North America on June 1, 1796
April 7, 1798	In response to the Yazoo Land Fraud, an act authorized negotiations with Georgia about ceding its western claim; the act also created Mississippi Territory from the region recently ceded by West Florida.	Map of the change to the United States in central North America on April 7, 1798
October 25, 1798	Commissioners agreed on the source of the St. Croix River, setting the far eastern border with Great Britain.	Map of the change to the United States in central North America on October 25, 1798
January 13, 1800	The survey of the Kentucky–Virginia border was approved by Virginia. (Note: No date of approval by Kentucky is known.) (Note: An act for confirming and establishing the boundary line between this state and the State of Kentucky, ascertained and fixed by certain commissioners appointed by both states, and for other purposes, Dec. 1779 Va. Acts chp. 46, p. 234)	Map of the change to the United States in central North America on January 13, 1800
April 10, 1800	The survey of the southern border along 31° north was completed. (Note: Surveyor Andrew Ellicott wrote, "The reports with the maps... being completed on the 10th of April;" no dates of government approval are known.)	Map of the change to the United States in central North America on April 10, 1800
May 30, 1800	The Connecticut Western Reserve was ceded to the federal government; it presumably was then considered part of the Northwest Territory. (Note: The act accepting the cession was approved on April 28, 1800, (Note: An act to authorize the President of the United States to accept, for the United States, a cession of jurisdiction of the territory west of Pennsylvania, commonly called the Western Reserve of Connecticut, Pub. L. 6–38, 2 Stat. 56) and Connecticut approved on May 30, 1800.)	Map of the change to the United States in central North America on May 30, 1800
July 4, 1800	Indiana Territory was organized from the western half of Northwest Territory. (Note: The new Indiana Territory–Northwest Territory border was a line from the mouth of the Kentucky River to Fort Recovery, then north.) (Note: An act to divide the territory of the United States northwest of the Ohio, into two separate governments, Pub. L. 6–41, 2 Stat. 58)	Map of the change to the United States in central North America on July 4, 1800
November 17, 1800	The Congress of the United States moved to Washington, now built and ready to be the capital.	Map of the change to the United States in central North America on November 17, 1800
February 27, 1801	The federal district was organized as the District of Columbia. (Note: An act concerning the District of Columbia, Pub. L. 6–15, 2 Stat. 103)	Map of the change to the United States in central North America on February 27, 1801
June 16, 1802	The western claim of Georgia, known as the Yazoo Lands, was ceded to the federal government. (Note: Georgia's commissioners agreed to cede the region on April 24, 1802, and the legislature approved on June 16, 1802. (Note: An act to ratify and confirm certain articles of agreement and cession entered into on the 24th day of April, 1802, between the commissioners of the State of Georgia on the one part, and the commissioners of the United States on the other part, 1802 Ga. Laws, no. 35, p. 48)) (Note: The new Georgia–federal border was: up the Chattahoochee River to its great bend (near West Point), then a line from there towards and past Nickajack until it reached the Tennessee River, and up that to Tennessee.) At the same time, the federal government ceded to Georgia the eastern portion of the region previously ceded by South Carolina, though Georgia technically already held title to the region, as the cession was based on an erroneous understanding of geography.	Map of the change to the United States in central North America on June 16, 1802
March 1, 1803	The southern half of the Northwest Territory, along with a thin sliver of Indiana Territory, was admitted as the seventeenth state, Ohio. (Note: On February 19, 1803, the president signed an act approving Ohio's boundaries and constitution; (Note: An act to provide for the due execution of the laws of the United States, within the State of Ohio, Pub. L. 7–7, 2 Stat. 201) however, Congress never passed a formal resolution admitting it as a state. When this was noticed in 1953, Congress retroactively set the date of statehood to March 1, 1803, (Note: Joint Resolution for admitting the State of Ohio into the Union, Pub. L. 83–204, 67 Stat. 407) the date the state legislature first met.) (Note: The western border of Ohio had been surveyed in 1799 as far north as Fort Recovery.) (Note: An act to enable the people of the eastern division of the territory northwest of the river Ohio to form a constitution and state government, and for the admission of such state into the Union, on an equal footing with the original States, and for other purposes, Pub. L. 7–40, 2 Stat. 173) The remainder of the Northwest Territory was transferred to Indiana Territory. The western border was a line due north from the mouth of the Great Miami River; the federal definition of the northern border was a line drawn east from the southern tip of Lake Michigan, whereas the Ohio Constitution stated the line should run from the southern tip of Lake Michigan to the most northerly cape of Maumee Bay. The confusion caused by these conflicting descriptions and inaccurate knowledge of geography would lead to the conflict over the Toledo Strip.	Map of the change to the United States in central North America on March 1, 1803
November 3, 1803	The survey of the Tennessee–Virginia border was approved. (Note: The survey was approved by Virginia on January 22, 1803, and by Tennessee on November 3, 1803. (Note: Virginia v. Tennessee, 148 U.S. 503, 517 (1893)))	Map of the change to the United States in central North America on November 3, 1803
November 30, 1803	The "Southwick Jog" was ceded by Connecticut to Massachusetts, to put to rest long-standing disagreements over their border. (Note: The final report of the commissioners was delivered on November 30, 1803; no dates of government approval are known.)	Map of the change to the United States in central North America on November 30, 1803

== 1803–1818 (Purchase of Louisiana) ==
Date	Event	Change map
December 20, 1803	The Louisiana Purchase was formally ceded from France. (Note: The treaty was signed April 30, and ratified and entered into force October 21, 1803. (Note: Treaty for the Cession of Louisiana, with France, T.S. 86, 8 Stat. 200) The formal turnover occurred in New Orleans on December 20, 1803, and would be recognized in St. Louis in Upper Louisiana on March 10, 1804, which would be known as known as Three Flags Day.) The acquisition expanded the country to the whole of the Mississippi River basin, (Note: There was some question as to whether the purchase also included the basins of the Missouri River and the Red River of the North, but the question was not relevant before the Treaty of 1818 definitively settled the border.) but the extent of what constituted Louisiana in the south was disputed with Spain: the United States claimed the purchase included the part of West Florida west of the Perdido River, whereas Spain claimed it ended at the western border of West Florida; (Note: The western border of West Florida was a series of waterways, mainly the Mississippi, Iberville, and Amite Rivers, and Lakes Pontchartrain and Maurepas.) and the southwestern border with New Spain was disputed, as the United States claimed the Sabine River as the border, but Spain maintained it was the Calcasieu River and others.	Map of the change to the United States in central North America on December 20, 1803 Map of the change to the international disputes involving the United States in central North America on December 20, 1803
March 27, 1804	The region between Tennessee and Mississippi Territory previously ceded by Georgia was assigned to Mississippi Territory. (Note: An act supplementary to the act intituled "An act regulating the grants of land, and providing for the disposal of the lands of the United States, south of the State of Tennessee," Pub. L. 8–61, 2 Stat. 303)	Map of the change to the United States in central North America on March 27, 1804
October 1, 1804	Orleans Territory was organized from the Louisiana Purchase south of 33° north, with the remainder being designated the District of Louisiana and placed under the jurisdiction of Indiana Territory. (Note: An act erecting Louisiana into two territories, and providing for the temporary government thereof, Pub. L. 8–38, 2 Stat. 283)	Map of the change to the United States in central North America on October 1, 1804
June 30, 1805	Michigan Territory was organized from Indiana Territory, north of a line east from the southern tip of Lake Michigan, and east of a line north from the lake's northern tip. (Note: An act to divide the Indiana Territory into two separate governments, Pub. L. 8–5, 2 Stat. 309)	Map of the change to the United States in central North America on June 30, 1805
July 4, 1805	The District of Louisiana was organized as Louisiana Territory. (Note: An act further providing for the government of the District of Louisiana, Pub. L. 8–31, 2 Stat. 331)	Map of the change to the United States in central North America on July 4, 1805
March 1, 1809	Illinois Territory was organized from the western half of Indiana Territory. (Note: The new Illinois Territory–Indiana Territory border was, up the Wabash River to Post Vincennes, then north.) (Note: An act for dividing the Indiana Territory into two separate governments, Pub. L. 10–13, 2 Stat. 514)	Map of the change to the United States in central North America on March 1, 1809
September 26, 1810	The Republic of West Florida declared independence from Spain, claiming the area of West Florida west of the Pearl River.	Map of the change to the international disputes involving the United States in central North America on September 26, 1810
December 10, 1810	The United States military took possession of the portion of West Florida west of the Pearl River, which they had considered to be included in the Louisiana Purchase, including the area which had formed the Republic of West Florida.	Map of the change to the international disputes involving the United States in central North America on December 10, 1810
April 30, 1812	Most of Orleans Territory was admitted as the eighteenth state, Louisiana. (Note: The northern border of Louisiana had been surveyed in 1806.) (Note: An act to enable the people of the Territory of Orleans to form a constitution and state government, and for the admission of such state into the Union, on an equal footing with the original states, and for other purposes, Pub. L. 11–21, 2 Stat. 641; An act for the admission of the State of Louisiana into the Union, and to extend the laws of the United States to the said state, Pub. L. 12–50, 2 Stat. 701)	Map of the change to the United States in central North America on April 30, 1812
May 14, 1812	The claimed portion of West Florida east of the Pearl River was assigned to Mississippi Territory. (Note: An act to enlarge the boundaries of the Mississippi Territory, Pub. L. 12–84, 2 Stat. 734)	Map of the change to the United States in central North America on May 14, 1812
August 4, 1812	The remaining claimed portion of West Florida, west of the Pearl River, was added to Louisiana. (Note: The cession was approved by the federal government on April 14, 1812, (Note: An act to enlarge the limits of the State of Louisiana, Pub. L. 12–57, 2 Stat. 708) and accepted by Louisiana on August 4, 1812. (Note: A resolution giving the assent of the Legislature to an enlargement of the limits of the State of Louisiana, 1812 La. Acts chp. 1, p. 4))	Map of the change to the United States in central North America on August 4, 1812
December 7, 1812	As its name was now shared with the state of Louisiana, Louisiana Territory was reorganized as Missouri Territory. (Note: An act providing for the government of the Territory of Missouri, Pub. L. 12–95, 2 Stat. 743)	Map of the change to the United States in central North America on December 7, 1812
August 24, 1814	British forces capture and burn Washington, but are forced to withdraw the next day. The functions of the capital were only momentarily suspended, though President James Madison took refuge in Brookville, Maryland.	no change to map
October 25, 1814	The survey of the New York–Vermont border was submitted.	Map of the change to the United States in central North America on October 25, 1814
October 25, 1815	The final part of the survey of the North Carolina–South Carolina border was completed.	Map of the change to the United States in central North America on October 25, 1815
December 11, 1816	The southern part of Indiana Territory, along with small parts of Illinois Territory and Michigan Territory, were admitted as the nineteenth state, Indiana. (Note: Indiana was defined as the territory north of the Ohio River and east of the Wabash River, but while the territory's line turned north at Post Vincennes, the state's border continued up the Wabash until it reached the point where a line drawn north from Post Vincennes would last intersect the river as it weaved back and forth. The northern border of the state was a line east from 10 miles north of the southern tip of Lake Michigan, until it reached the meridian that formed Ohio's western border, which was a line drawn north from the mouth of the Great Miami River.) (Note: An act to enable the people of the Indiana Territory to form a constitution and state government, and for the admission of such state into the Union on an equal footing with the original states, Pub. L. 14–57, 3 Stat. 289; Resolution for admitting the State of Indiana into the Union, 3 Stat. 399)	Map of the change to the United States in central North America on December 11, 1816
March 3, 1817	Alabama Territory was organized from the eastern half of Mississippi Territory. (Note: The new Alabama Territory–Mississippi Territory border was, from the north: up the Tennessee River to Bear Creek (around today's Pickwick Lake); a line to the northwestern corner of Washington County, Mississippi Territory; then south.) (Note: An act to establish a separate territorial government for the eastern part of the Mississippi Territory, Pub. L. 14–59, 3 Stat. 371)	Map of the change to the United States in central North America on March 3, 1817
December 10, 1817	Mississippi Territory was admitted as the twentieth state, Mississippi. (Note: An act to enable the people of the western part of the Mississippi Territory to form a constitution and state government, and for the admission of such state into the union, on an equal footing with the original states, Pub. L. 14–23, 3 Stat. 348; Resolution for the admission of the State of Mississippi into the Union, 3 Stat. 472)	Map of the change to the United States in central North America on December 10, 1817
June 30, 1818	Per the terms of the Treaty of Ghent ending the War of 1812, the United States and the United Kingdom (Note: The Kingdom of Great Britain united with the Kingdom of Ireland on January 1, 1801, becoming the United Kingdom.) exchanged several islands that had been captured during the war, returning Moose Island to Massachusetts, and Campobello Island, Deer Island, and Grand Manan Island to the United Kingdom.	not mapped
December 3, 1818	The half of Illinois Territory south of 42°30′ north was admitted as the twenty-first state, Illinois. The remainder of the territory, along with the unorganized territory that was recently part of Indiana Territory, was assigned to Michigan Territory. (Note: An act to enable the people of the Illinois Territory to form a constitution and state government, and for the admission of such state into the Union on an equal footing with the original states, Pub. L. 15–67, 3 Stat. 428; Resolution declaring the admission of the State of Illinois into the Union, 3 Stat. 536)	Map of the change to the United States in central North America on December 3, 1818

== 1819–1845 (Northwest expansion) ==
Date	Event	Change map
January 30, 1819	The Treaty of 1818 set 49° north as the border with the United Kingdom west of the Lake of the Woods, and established the Oregon Country as a shared region with the United Kingdom. (Note: The treaty was signed October 20, 1818, ratified January 28, 1819, and entered into force January 30, 1819. (Note: Convention on Fisheries, Boundary, and Restoration of Slaves, with the United Kingdom, T.S. 112, 8 Stat. 248)) (Note: Oregon Country had no defined northern limit; it can be assumed that it did not encroach upon Russian-held lands, and 54°40′ north would be established as the border in 1825.)	Map of the change to the United States in central North America on January 30, 1819 Map of the change to the United States in northwest North America on January 30, 1819
July 4, 1819	Arkansaw Territory was organized from the southern slice of Missouri Territory. (Note: The new Arkansaw Territory–Missouri Territory border was, from where the Mississippi River meets 36° north: west to the St. Francis River, up that to 36°30′ north, then west.) (Note: An act establishing a separate territorial government in the southern part of the Territory of Missouri, Pub. L. 15–49, 3 Stat. 493)	Map of the change to the United States in central North America on July 4, 1819
October 30, 1819	The survey of the Georgia–Tennessee border was approved by Tennessee. (Note: An act ratifying and confirming the line run and marked by commissioners between the States of Tennessee and Georgia, in the year 1818, 1819 Tenn. Acts chp. 18, p. 475) The line, which was surveyed slightly south of the intended border of 35° north and cuts Georgia off from the Tennessee River, has never been approved by Georgia.	Map of the change to the United States in central North America on October 30, 1819
December 14, 1819	Alabama Territory was admitted as the twenty-second state, Alabama. (Note: An act to enable the people of the Alabama Territory to form a constitution and state government, and for the admission of such state into the Union on an equal footing with the original states, Pub. L. 15–47, 3 Stat. 489; Resolution declaring the admission of the State of Alabama into the Union, 3 Stat. 608)	Map of the change to the United States in central North America on December 14, 1819
March 15, 1820	As part of the Missouri Compromise, the District of Maine, the northern and separate part of Massachusetts, was admitted as the twenty-third state, Maine. (Note: An act for the admission of the State of Maine into the Union, Pub. L. 16–19, 3 Stat. 544)	Map of the change to the United States in central North America on March 15, 1820
April 21, 1820	This is the earliest known date of the name "Arkansas Territory" being officially used instead of "Arkansaw Territory". (Note: An act relative to the Arkansas Territory, Pub. L. 16–48, 3 Stat. 565)	Map of the change to the United States in central North America on April 21, 1820
May 12, 1820	The survey of the Kentucky–Tennessee border from the east to Clear Fork, and from the Cumberland River to the Tennessee River, was approved. (Note: The compact between the states was signed on February 2, 1820; approved by Kentucky on February 11, 1820; (Note: An act to ratify and confirm the adjustment of the boundary line between this state and the State of Tennessee, according to the articles of stipulation entered into by the commissioners appointed by both states, 1819 Ky. Acts chp. 546, p. 922–923) and approved by the federal government on May 12, 1821. (Note: Resolution giving the consent of Congress to a compact concluded between the States of Kentucky and Tennessee, for the settlement of their boundary line, 3 Stat. 609))	Map of the change to the United States in central North America on May 12, 1820
July 19, 1820	The survey of the Alabama–Mississippi border was completed. (Note: Alabama's southwestern border was defined as a north-south line, but the statehood act called for a survey to confirm if this encroached on counties established by Mississippi; it was found to do so, and the southern terminus of the border was moved about 3.8 miles to the east.)	Map of the change to the United States in central North America on July 19, 1820
1821	The survey of the Georgia–North Carolina border was completed in 1821.	Map of the change to the United States in central North America sometime in 1821
February 22, 1821	The Adams–Onís Treaty with Spain entered into force. (Note: The treaty was signed February 22, 1819, and ratified and entered into force February 22, 1821. (Note: Treaty of Amity, Settlement, and Limits, with Spain, T.S. 327, 8 Stat. 252)) The many changes included: The border with the holdings of Spain was concretely defined; previously, it had been the watershed of the Mississippi River and, for Oregon Country, the Columbia River, whereas now it followed specific rivers and parallels. (Note: The new border was, from the Gulf of Mexico: up the Sabine River to 32° north; north to the Red River; up that to 100° west; north to the Arkansas River; up that to its source; north to 42° north; then west to the Pacific Ocean.); The new border placed the "Neutral Ground" in Louisiana.; The Floridas were ceded to the United States, with the formal transfer happening in July 1821.	Map of the change to the United States in central North America on February 22, 1821 Map of the change to the international disputes involving the United States in central North America on February 22, 1821
July 2, 1821	The survey of the Illinois–Indiana border was completed.	Map of the change to the United States in central North America on July 2, 1821
July 10, 1821	East Florida was formally transferred to the United States by Spain.	Map of the change to the United States in central North America on July 10, 1821
July 17, 1821	West Florida was formally transferred to the United States by Spain.	Map of the change to the United States in central North America on July 17, 1821
August 10, 1821	The southeastern corner of Missouri Territory was admitted as the twenty-fourth state, Missouri. (Note: The new Missouri–federal border was, from the mouth of the Des Moines River: up the river to a point west of the Des Moines Rapids on the Mississippi River, west to a point north of the mouth of the Kansas River, then south. The northern border had been surveyed in 1816, and the survey of the western border south of the Kansas River would be completed on October 16, 1823.) (Note: An act to authorize the people of the Missouri Territory to form a constitution and state government, and for the admission of such state into the Union on an equal footing with the original states, and to prohibit slavery in certain territories, Pub. L. 16–22, 3 Stat. 545; Resolution providing for the admission of the State of Missouri into the Union, on a certain condition, 3 Stat. 645; Proclamation admitting Missouri as a State, 3 Stat. 797)	Map of the change to the United States in central North America on August 10, 1821
November 19, 1821	The survey of the North Carolina–Tennessee border was approved by North Carolina. (Note: The survey was approved by North Carolina during the session beginning November 19, 1821; (Note: An act to confirm the boundary line between this state and the State of Tennessee, and for other purposes, 1821 N.C. Acts chp. 41, p. 38) no date of approval by Tennessee is known.)	Map of the change to the United States in central North America on November 19, 1821
November 22, 1821	The survey of the gap in the previous Kentucky–Tennessee border survey was approved. (Note: The survey was approved by Kentucky on November 13, 1821, and by Tennessee on November 22, 1821.)	Map of the change to the United States in central North America on November 22, 1821
March 30, 1822	The former East Florida and West Florida were organized as Florida Territory. (Note: An act for the establishment of a territorial government in Florida, Pub. L. 17–13, 3 Stat. 654)	Map of the change to the United States in central North America on March 30, 1822
May 26, 1824	The western border of Arkansas Territory was moved east to a line south from a point 40 miles west of Missouri's western border. (Note: An act to fix the western boundary line of the Territory of Arkansas, and for other purposes, Pub. L. 18–155, 4 Stat. 40)	Map of the change to the United States in central North America on May 26, 1824
January 11, 1825	A treaty with the Russian Empire established 54°40′ north as the northern border of Oregon Country; (Note: The treaty was signed April 17, 1824, ratified January 7, 1825, and entered into force January 11, 1825. (Note: Convention on Navigation, Fishing, Trading, and the Northwest Coast of America, with Russia, T.S. 298, 8 Stat. 302)) a separate treaty created the same border between Russia and the United Kingdom.	Map of the change to the United States in northwest North America on January 11, 1825
November 3, 1826	An adjustment is made to the Connecticut–Massachusetts border, to correct a very small jog.	not mapped
May 28, 1828	The western border of Arkansas Territory was again moved east, ceding land to the Cherokee. (Note: The treaty was signed May 6, and ratified May 28, 1828. (Note: Treaty with the Western Cherokee, Ratified Indian Treaty 152, 7 Stat. 311)) (Note: The new Arkansas Territory–federal border was, from the north: a line from the southwestern corner of Missouri to a point on the Arkansas River "100 paces east" of Fort Smith, as the border of the lands of the Eastern Choctaw, then south. However, the Arkansas Supreme Court determined in 1909 that the "100 paces east" was a clerical error, and that logically it should have said "100 paces west". (Note: Bowman v. State, 93 Ark. 168, 129 S.W. 80) The western border of Arkansas Territory south of Fort Smith had been surveyed in 1825.)	Map of the change to the United States in central North America on May 28, 1828
July 1, 1829	The survey of the Maine–New Hampshire border was approved. (Note: The survey was approved by Maine on February 28, 1829, and by New Hampshire on July 1, 1829.)	Map of the change to the United States in central North America on July 1, 1829
January 10, 1831	King William I of the Netherlands, having been asked per the Treaty of Ghent to arbitrate the disputed border between Maine and the United Kingdom, rendered his decision: since reconciling the treaty with the maps given was too difficult, he drew a compromise line. The United Kingdom accepted it, but the United States rejected it. (Note: H. Misc. Doc. 53-212, p. 119)	no change to map
December 20, 1831	The survey of the western, final leg of the Kentucky–Tennessee border was approved. (Note: The survey was approved by Kentucky on February 9, 1828, and by Tennessee on December 20, 1831.)	Map of the change to the United States in central North America on December 20, 1831
July 9, 1832	The region of New Hampshire north of the Connecticut Lakes, which was disputed with the United Kingdom, declared independence as the Republic of Indian Stream.	Map of the change to the international disputes involving the United States in central North America on July 9, 1832
June 28, 1834	Michigan Territory gained a large region from unorganized territory, extending west to the Missouri River and White Earth River. (Note: An act to attach the territory of the United States west of the Mississippi river, and north of the state of Missouri, to the Territory of Michigan, Pub. L. 23–98, 4 Stat. 701)	Map of the change to the United States in central North America on June 28, 1834
August 5, 1835	The Republic of Indian Stream recognized the jurisdiction of New Hampshire, ending its claimed independence. (Note: Authorities with Indian Stream communicated to the British government on August 5, 1835, that they had accepted New Hampshire jurisdiction; a resolution to this effect was approved by the citizens of Indian Stream on April 2, 1836.)	Map of the change to the international disputes involving the United States in central North America on August 5, 1835
June 15, 1836	Arkansas Territory was admitted as the twenty-fifth state, Arkansas. (Note: The western border north of Fort Smith had been surveyed in 1831.) (Note: An act for the admission of the State of Arkansas into the Union, and to provide for the due execution of the laws of the United States, within the same, and for other purposes, Pub. L. 24–100, 5 Stat. 50)	Map of the change to the United States in central North America on June 15, 1836
June 23, 1836	The surveys of the northern borders of Illinois, Indiana, and Ohio, were approved. (Note: The northern half of the Indiana–Ohio border was surveyed in 1817 along with the northern border.) (Note: An act to settle and establish the northern boundary line of the State of Ohio, Pub. L. 24–117, 5 Stat. 56)	Map of the change to the United States in central North America on June 23, 1836
July 3, 1836	Wisconsin Territory was organized from the western bulk of Michigan Territory. (Note: The new Michigan Territory–Wisconsin Territory border was, from Lake Superior: up the Montreal River to Lac Vieux Desert; a line to the source of the Menominee River; then down that to Green Bay. However, this definition was impossible, as the Montreal River ended long before it reached Lac Vieux Desert.) (Note: An act establishing the territorial government of Wisconsin, Pub. L. 24–54, 5 Stat. 10) The two large peninsulas between the Great Lakes remained in Michigan Territory; the upper peninsula was included in exchange for the territory abandoning its claim to the Toledo Strip.	Map of the change to the United States in central North America on July 3, 1836
December 14, 1836	Michigan Territory agreed to abandon its claim to the Toledo Strip, ending its dispute with Ohio.	Map of the change to the United States in central North America on December 14, 1836
January 26, 1837	Michigan Territory was admitted as the twenty-sixth state, Michigan. (Note: An act to establish the northern boundary line of the State of Ohio, and to provide for the admission of the State of Michigan into the Union upon the conditions therein expressed, Pub. L. 24–99, 5 Stat. 49; An act to admit the State of Michigan into the Union, upon an equal footing with the original states, Pub. L. 24–6, 5 Stat. 144)	Map of the change to the United States in central North America on January 26, 1837
March 28, 1837	The Platte Purchase, obtained from several nations including the Potawatomi, Iowa, Missouria, Otoe, Sauk and Meskwaki, was ceded to Missouri, extending its northern border west to the Missouri River. (Note: The cession was approved by the federal government on June 7, 1836, (Note: An act to extend the western boundary of the State of Missouri to the Missouri River, Pub. L. 24–86, 5 Stat. 34) accepted by Missouri on December 16, 1836, (Note: Missouri v. Kansas, 213 U.S. 78, 84 (1909)) and proclaimed by the president on March 28, 1837. (Note: Proclamation issued by the President of the United States, under the act of June 7, 1836, chap. 86, 5 Stat. 802))	Map of the change to the United States in central North America on March 28, 1837
November 9, 1837	The survey of the Mississippi–Tennessee border was approved by Tennessee. (Note: No date of approval by Mississippi is known.) (Note: 1837 Tenn. Priv. Acts chp. 7)	Map of the change to the United States in central North America on November 9, 1837
July 3, 1838	Iowa Territory was organized from Wisconsin Territory west of the Mississippi River. (Note: An act to divide the Territory of Wisconsin and to establish the territorial government of Iowa, Pub. L. 25–96, 5 Stat. 235)	Map of the change to the United States in central North America on July 3, 1838
1839	The survey of the Alabama–Tennessee border was completed in 1839.	Map of the change to the United States in central North America in 1839
February 11, 1839	Missouri claimed an area north of its border with Iowa Territory, initiating the long dispute known as the Honey War. (Note: S. Doc. 26-4, p. 3)	Map of the change to the United States in central North America on February 11, 1839
January 27, 1840	The survey of the Alabama–Georgia border was approved. (Note: The survey was approved by Georgia on December 8, 1826, and by Alabama on January 27, 1840.)	Map of the change to the United States in central North America on January 27, 1840
June 24, 1841	The survey of the border with Texas was completed. (Note: H. Doc. 27-52, p. 78)	Map of the change to the United States in central North America on June 24, 1841
October 13, 1842	The Webster–Ashburton Treaty defined the border with the United Kingdom east of the Rocky Mountains. (Note: The treaty was signed August 9, ratified August 22, and entered into force October 13, 1842. (Note: Webster–Ashburton Treaty, with the United Kingdom, T.S. 119, 8 Stat. 572)) The treaty resolved the disputes over the northern borders of Maine and New Hampshire (Note: The new northeastern border was, from Passamaquoddy Bay: up the St. Croix River to its source; north to the St. John River; up that to the St. Francis River; up that to its source outlet at Lake Pohenegamook; southwest to the northwest branch of the St. John River; a line from there to where the St. John River crosses 46°25′ north; up the river to its source; along the highlands to the source of Halls Stream, then down that to 45° north.) and the northeastern border of Wisconsin Territory, (Note: The new northern border was, from Lake Superior: up the Pigeon River to the many lakes and rivers of the Boundary Waters, eventually reaching the Rainy River; then down that to the Lake of the Woods.) as well as affirming the American claim to Sugar Island.	Map of the change to the United States in central North America on October 13, 1842 Map of the change to the international disputes involving the United States in central North America on October 13, 1842
March 3, 1845	Florida Territory was admitted as the twenty-seventh state, Florida. (Note: An act for the admission of the States of Iowa and Florida into the Union, Pub. L. 28–48, 5 Stat. 742)	Map of the change to the United States in central North America on March 3, 1845

== 1845–1860 (Southwest expansion) ==
Date	Event	Change map
December 29, 1845	The Republic of Texas was annexed and admitted as the twenty-eighth state, Texas, (Note: Texas formally handed over sovereignty to the United States in a ceremony on February 19, 1846.) (Note: Joint Resolution for annexing Texas to the United States, 5 Stat. 797; Joint Resolution for the admission of the State of Texas into the Union, 9 Stat. 108) extending the United States southwest to the Rio Grande. All of Texas was claimed by Mexico. (Note: While many sources state that Mexico recognized the independence of the eastern portion of Texas, the treaties were rejected by the Mexican government.) The annexation led to the beginning of the Mexican–American War a few months later.	Map of the change to the United States in central North America on December 29, 1845
July 17, 1846	The Oregon Treaty established 49° north west of the Lake of the Woods as the continental border with the holdings of the United Kingdom, ending the sharing of Oregon Country. (Note: The treaty was signed June 15, ratified June 19, and entered into force July 17, 1846. (Note: Oregon Treaty, with the United Kingdom, T.S. 120, 9 Stat. 869)) The treaty was vague on which strait should be the border between Vancouver Island and the continent, causing a dispute over ownership of the San Juan Islands.	Map of the change to the United States in central North America on July 17, 1846 Map of the change to the international disputes involving the United States in central North America on July 17, 1846
December 28, 1846	The portion of Iowa Territory south of 43°30′ north and east of the Big Sioux River was admitted as the twenty-ninth state, Iowa. (Note: The survey of the northern border would be completed on August 9, 1852.) (Note: An act for the admission of the State of Iowa into the Union, Pub. L. 29–1, 9 Stat. 117)	Map of the change to the United States in central North America on December 28, 1846
March 20, 1847	The District of Columbia retroceded Alexandria County to Virginia. (Note: The retrocession act was approved on July 9, 1846, (Note: An act to retrocede the County of Alexandria, in the District of Columbia, to the State of Virginia, Pub. L. 29–35, 9 Stat. 35) residents of Alexandria County were proclaimed by the president on September 7, 1846, to have agreed to it, (Note: Proclamation declaring Alexandria County to be retroceded to Virginia, 9 Stat. 1000) and Virginia took possession on March 20, 1847. (Note: An act to extend the jurisdiction of the Commonwealth of Virginia over the County of Alexandria, 1847 Va. Acts chp. 53, p. 41))	Map of the change to the United States in central North America on March 20, 1847
June 28, 1847	The survey of the border with the United Kingdom east of the Great Lakes was submitted. (Note: Article III of the Treaty of 1908 noted that the survey was completed on June 28, 1847. (Note: Treaty on the Canadian Boundary, with the United Kingdom, T.S. 497, 35 Stat. 2003))	Map of the change to the United States in central North America on June 28, 1847
November 5, 1847	The survey of the Michigan–Wisconsin Territory border was submitted. (Note: S. Ex. Docs. 30th Cong., 1st sess., volume 2, Serial Set 504, pp. 73-75)	Map of the change to the United States in central North America on November 5, 1847
February 15, 1848	The survey of the Arkansas–Missouri border was approved. (Note: An act to confirm the boundary line between Missouri and Arkansas, Pub. L. 30–10, 9 Stat. 211)	Map of the change to the United States in central North America on February 15, 1848
May 29, 1848	The southern bulk of Wisconsin Territory was admitted as the thirtieth state, Wisconsin. (Note: The new Wisconsin–Wisconsin Territory border was, from Lake Superior: up the St. Louis River to its first rapids; south to the St. Croix River; then down that to the Mississippi River.) (Note: An act to enable the people of Wisconsin Territory to form a constitution and state government, and for the admission of such state into the Union, Pub. L. 29–89, 9 Stat. 56; An act for the admission of the State of Wisconsin into the Union, Pub. L. 30–50, 9 Stat. 233) However, the citizens of the remainder decided to continue on with a civil government, and elected a delegate to the United States House of Representatives who would be seated on January 15, 1849, essentially making this region a de facto continuation of Wisconsin Territory.	Map of the change to the United States in central North America on May 29, 1848
May 30, 1848	The Treaty of Guadalupe Hidalgo ended the Mexican–American War and ceded a large region from Mexico, consisting of its territories of Alta California and Santa Fe de Nuevo México, and its claim to Texas; (Note: The treaty was signed February 2, ratified March 16, and entered into force May 30, 1848. (Note: Treaty of Guadalupe Hidalgo, with Mexico, T.S. 207, 9 Stat. 922)) (Note: The new international border was, from the Rio Grande: along the southern and western border of New Mexico until it met the Gila River; down that to the Colorado River; then a line to a point one league south of the port of San Diego. However, the southern border of New Mexico was in question, with the American claim being 31°52′ north, and the Mexican claim being 32°22′ north.) however, there was a disagreement over the specific southern border of Santa Fe de Nuevo México.	Map of the change to the United States in central North America on May 30, 1848 Map of the change to the international disputes involving the United States in central North America on May 30, 1848
August 14, 1848	Oregon Territory was organized from the former Oregon Country. (Note: An act to establish the territorial government of Oregon, Pub. L. 30–177, 9 Stat. 323)	Map of the change to the United States in central North America on August 14, 1848
February 13, 1849	The border dispute between Iowa and Missouri known as the Honey War was resolved by the Supreme Court. The resulting border was the Sullivan Line that existed before the dispute, roughly splitting the two claims. (Note: Missouri v. Iowa, 48 U.S. 660 (1849))	Map of the change to the United States in central North America on February 13, 1849
March 3, 1849	Minnesota Territory was organized from the region that had been operating as de facto Wisconsin Territory, and unorganized territory east of the Missouri and White Earth Rivers. (Note: An act to establish the territorial government of Minnesota, Pub. L. 30–121, 9 Stat. 403)	Map of the change to the United States in central North America on March 3, 1849
March 12, 1849	Settlers formed the State of Deseret and claimed a vast portion of the southwest. Though it petitioned to be admitted to the United States, the proposal was rejected and, in 1850, Utah Territory was formed instead.	Map of the change to the United States in central North America on March 12, 1849
November 24, 1849	The Louisiana–Texas border was shifted from the west bank to the middle of the Sabine River. (Note: The federal government consented on July 5, 1848, (Note: An act giving the consent of the government of the United States to the State of Texas to extend her eastern boundary, so as to include within her limits one half of Sabine Pass, Sabine Lake, and Sabine River, as far north as the thirty-second degree of north latitude, Pub. L. 30–94, 9 Stat. 245) and Texas approved on November 24, 1849.) (Note: United States v. Louisiana, 394 U.S. 1, F2 (1969))	not mapped
September 9, 1850	The western portion of the Mexican Cession was admitted as the thirty-first state, California. (Note: The new California–federal border was, from the north: south along 120° west to 39° north; a line to where the Colorado River intersects 35° north; then down the Colorado River.) (Note: An act for the admission of the State of California into the Union, Pub. L. 31–50, 9 Stat. 452) The portion of the remainder north of 37° north and west of the summit of the Rocky Mountains was organized as Utah Territory. (Note: Part of Utah Territory overlapped with the portion of Texas that would be purchased on December 13, 1850.) (Note: An act to establish a territorial government for Utah, Pub. L. 31–51, 9 Stat. 453)	Map of the change to the United States in central North America on September 9, 1850
December 9, 1850	The United Kingdom ceded less than one acre of underwater rock for a lighthouse in Lake Erie near Buffalo, New York; although it was on Middle Reef, it was named for the nearby Horseshoe Reef. It was surrounded by British waters, creating a form of enclave.	Map of the change to the United States in central North America on December 9, 1850
December 13, 1850	The federal government purchased the western claim of Texas. (Note: The new Texas–federal border was, from the south: up the Rio Grande to 32° north; east to 103° west; north to 36°30′ north; then east.) New Mexico Territory was organized from the part of this region east of the Rio Grande, along with the remaining unorganized territory from the Mexican Cession. (Note: The new New Mexico Territory–federal border was, from 36°30′ north and 103° west: north to 38° north; then west to the summit of the San Juan Mountains (called then the Sierra Madre).) (Note: An act proposing to the State of Texas the establishment of her northern and western boundaries, the relinquishment by the said state of all territory claimed by her exterior to said boundaires, and of all her claims upon the United States, and to establish a territorial government for New Mexico, Pub. L. 31–49, 9 Stat. 446; Proclamation declaring Act of 1850, ch. 49, respecting the boundaries of Texas, to be in force, 9 Stat. 1005)	Map of the change to the United States in central North America on December 13, 1850
January 3, 1851	The survey of the Iowa–Missouri border was approved by the Supreme Court. (Note: Missouri v. Iowa, 51 U.S. 1 (1850))	Map of the change to the United States in central North America on January 3, 1851
April 5, 1851	The State of Deseret dissolved itself, its functions and territory largely having been superseded by Utah Territory.	Map of the change to the United States in central North America on April 5, 1851
December 11, 1852	The survey of the western Wisconsin border was submitted.	Map of the change to the United States in central North America on December 11, 1852
March 2, 1853	Washington Territory was organized from the half of Oregon Territory north of 46° north and the Columbia River. (Note: An act to establish the territorial government of Washington, Pub. L. 32–90, 10 Stat. 172)	Map of the change to the United States in central North America on March 2, 1853
May 30, 1854	The Kansas–Nebraska Act organized Kansas Territory from unorganized territory lying between 37° north and 40° north, and Nebraska Territory from unorganized territory north of 40° north. (Note: An act to organize the Territories of Nebraska and Kansas, Pub. L. 33–59, 10 Stat. 277) Much of the remaining unorganized territory, east of 100° west, became known as Indian Territory, designated as a place to resettle native nations. A small strip between the Texas Panhandle and Kansas Territory was unclaimed because it fell south of Kansas Territory's border but north of 36°30′ north, which had been established in the Missouri Compromise as the northern limit of slavery, and thus Texas could not have it. This became known as the Public Land Strip, or sometimes "No Man's Land".	Map of the change to the United States in central North America on May 30, 1854
June 30, 1854	The United States purchased a large parcel from Mexico known as the Gadsden Purchase, as it offered a much better route for a southern transcontinental railroad. (Note: The treaty was signed December 30, 1853, ratified June 29, 1854, and entered into force June 30, 1854. (Note: Gadsden Treaty, with Mexico, T.S. 208, 10 Stat. 1031)) (Note: The new international border was, starting from where the Rio Grande crosses 31°47′ north: west 100 miles; south to 31°20′ north; west to 111° west; a line to a point on the Colorado River 20 miles below the mouth of the Gila River; then up the Colorado River.) This resolved the border dispute, since the disputed region was included in the purchase.	Map of the change to the United States in central North America on June 30, 1854 Map of the change to the international disputes involving the United States in central North America on June 30, 1854
August 4, 1854	The recently obtained Gadsden Purchase was assigned to New Mexico Territory. (Note: An act declaring the southern boundary of New Mexico, Pub. L. 33–245, 10 Stat. 575)	Map of the change to the United States in central North America on August 4, 1854
January 11, 1855	Boston Corner was ceded by Massachusetts to New York due to its inaccessibility from the rest of the Massachusetts. (Note: Massachusetts made the cession on May 14, 1853, New York accepted it on July 21, 1853, the federal government consented on January 8, 1855, (Note: An act giving the consent of Congress to the cession by the State of Massachusetts to the State of New York, of the district of Boston Corner, Pub. L. 33–20, 10 Stat. 602) and the cession was proclaimed on January 11, 1855.)	Map of the change to the United States in central North America on January 11, 1855
March 6, 1855	The Supreme Court ruled in favor of Florida in a border dispute with Georgia, setting the state line along McNeil's line. (Note: Florida v. Georgia, 58 U.S. 478, 480 (1854))	no change to map
August 1, 1856	The survey of the border with Mexico was submitted. (Note: H. Ex. Doc. 34-135)	Map of the change to the United States in central North America on August 1, 1856
October 28, 1856	Baker Island and Jarvis Island were claimed under the Guano Islands Act.	Map of the change to the United States in the Pacific Ocean on October 28, 1856
May 11, 1858	The eastern half of Minnesota Territory was admitted as the thirty-second state, Minnesota. (Note: The new Minnesota–federal border was, from the north: up the Red River to the Bois de Sioux River; up that to Lake Traverse and its southern tip; a line to Big Stone Lake and through that to its southern tip; then south.) (Note: An act to authorize the people of the Territory of Minnesota to form a constitution and state government, preparatory to their admission in the union on an equal Footing with the original states, Pub. L. 34–60, 11 Stat. 166; An act for the admission of the State of Minnesota into the Union, Pub. L. 35–31, 11 Stat. 285)	Map of the change to the United States in central North America on May 11, 1858
August 31, 1858	Navassa Island was claimed under the Guano Islands Act; it was claimed by Haiti. (Note: Haiti claimed the island by name in its 1874 constitution, (Note: 1874 Haiti Constitution, art. 2) and had considered it included in the "adjacent islands" claimed since the 1801 constitution. (Note: 1801 Haiti Constitution, art. 1))	Map of the change to the United States in the Caribbean Sea on August 31, 1858
December 3, 1858	Howland Island was claimed under the Guano Islands Act.	Map of the change to the United States in the Pacific Ocean on December 3, 1858
February 14, 1859	The western half of Oregon Territory was admitted as the thirty-third state, Oregon. (Note: The new Oregon–Washington Territory border was, from the north, up the Snake River to the mouth of the Owyhee River, then south. The border with California would be surveyed in 1870.) The remainder was assigned to Washington Territory. (Note: An act for the admission of Oregon into the Union, Pub. L. 35–33, 11 Stat. 383)	Map of the change to the United States in central North America on February 14, 1859
July 6, 1859	Surveyors created the "Middleton Offset", a small notch in the Kentucky–Tennessee border. It is unknown exactly why this was done, though one theory is a local landowner wanted his property in Tennessee.	Map of the change to the United States in central North America on July 6, 1859
September 6, 1859	Johnston Atoll was claimed under the Guano Islands Act, though it had been claimed by Hawaii in 1858.	Map of the change to the United States in the Pacific Ocean on September 6, 1859
November 7, 1859	Settlers organized a provisional government for parts of the territories of Kansas, Nebraska, New Mexico, Utah, and Washington, with the name of Jefferson Territory. (Note: The claimed borders of Jefferson Territory were between 37° north, 43° north, 102° west, and 110° west.) While never recognized by the federal government, it operated until Colorado Territory was established.	Map of the change to the United States in central North America on November 7, 1859
December 27, 1859	Enderbury Island, McKean Island, Phoenix Island, and Starbuck Island were claimed under the Guano Islands Act.	Map of the change to the United States in the Pacific Ocean on December 27, 1859
December 29, 1859	Christmas Island and Malden Island were claimed under the Guano Islands Act.	Map of the change to the United States in the Pacific Ocean on December 29, 1859
February 8, 1860	Several dozen islands in the Pacific Ocean were claimed under the Guano Islands Act, including Atafu, Birnie Island, Butaritari, Canton Island, Caroline Island, Fanning Island, Flint Island, Gardner Island, Kingman Reef, Manihiki, Marakei, Nassau, Nukunonu, Palmyra Atoll, Penrhyn, Pukapuka, Rakahanga, Swains Island, Sydney Island, Vostok Island, and Washington Island. (Note: Forty-six islands were claimed on February 8, 1860, with varying degrees of accuracy and provenance: The islands that were accurately described and named: Birnie Island, Caroline Island, Flint Island, Gardner Island, Nassau, Palmyra Atoll, Penrhyn, Sydney Island, and Washington Island.; The islands that were accurately described, with less common names: Atafu (recorded as "Duke of York Island"); Butaritari (recorded as "Mackin or Makin"); Canton Island (recorded as "Mary's Island"); Fanning Island (recorded as "America Islands"); Kingman Reef (recorded as "Danger Rock"); Manihiki (recorded as "Ganges Island" and "Humphrey's Island"); Marakei (recorded as "Mathews Island"); Nukunonu (recorded as "Clarence Island"); Pukapuka (recorded as "Dangerous Islands"); Rakahanga (recorded as "Rierson's Island"); Swains Island (recorded as "Quiros Island"); and Vostok Island (recorded as "Staver's Island").; The rest appear to be phantom islands; Sarah Ann Island was sighted in 1917, but has since disappeared.; Enderbury Island, Phoenix Island, and Starbuck Island were re-bonded to the United States Guano Company, having been bonded to the Phoenix Guano Company on December 27, 1859.)	Map of the change to the United States in the Pacific Ocean on February 8, 1860

== 1860–1865 (Civil War) ==
Date	Event	Change map
December 20, 1860	In response to the election of Abraham Lincoln, South Carolina proclaimed its secession from the Union, withdrawing from the United States Congress.	Map of the change to the United States in central North America on December 20, 1860
January 9, 1861	Mississippi proclaimed its secession from the Union, withdrawing from Congress.	Map of the change to the United States in central North America on January 9, 1861
January 10, 1861	Florida proclaimed its secession from the Union, withdrawing from Congress.	Map of the change to the United States in central North America on January 10, 1861
January 11, 1861	Alabama proclaimed its secession from the Union, withdrawing from Congress.	Map of the change to the United States in central North America on January 11, 1861
January 19, 1861	Georgia proclaimed its secession from the Union, withdrawing from Congress.	Map of the change to the United States in central North America on January 19, 1861
January 26, 1861	Louisiana proclaimed its secession from the Union, withdrawing from Congress. However, the 1st and 2nd congressional districts, around New Orleans, continued to send representatives to Congress.	Map of the change to the United States in central North America on January 26, 1861
January 29, 1861	The bulk of Kansas Territory east of 25° west from Washington was admitted as the thirty-fourth state, Kansas. (Note: The northern Kansas border had been surveyed by 1859.) (Note: An act for the admission of Kansas into the Union, Pub. L. 36–20, 12 Stat. 126)	Map of the change to the United States in central North America on January 29, 1861
February 8, 1861	The Confederate States of America was formed by the seceded states of Alabama, Georgia, Florida, Louisiana, Mississippi, and South Carolina.	Map of the change to the international disputes involving the United States in central North America on February 8, 1861
February 28, 1861	Colorado Territory was organized from portions of Nebraska Territory, New Mexico Territory, and Utah Territory, along with unorganized territory. (Note: The borders of Colorado Territory were parallels 37° north and 41° north, and Washington meridians 25° west and 32° west.) (Note: An act to provide a temporary government for the Territory of Colorado, Pub. L. 36–59, 12 Stat. 172)	Map of the change to the United States in central North America on February 28, 1861
March 2, 1861	Texas proclaimed its secession from the Union, withdrawing from Congress, and was admitted to the Confederate States. (Note: An act to admit Texas as a member of the Confederate States of America, Provisional Confederate Cong., sess. 1, chp. 24, p. 44) Dakota Territory was organized from Nebraska Territory and the unorganized territory north of it. (Note: The new Nebraska Territory–Dakota Territory border was, from the east: up the Missouri River to the Niobrara River; up that to the Keya Paha River; up that to 43° north; then west.) Nebraska Territory's western border was moved to 33° west from Washington, gaining small portions of Utah Territory and Washington Territory. (Note: An act to provide a temporary government for the Territory of Dakota, and to create the Office of Surveyor General therein, Pub. L. 36–86, 12 Stat. 239) Nevada Territory was organized from Utah Territory west of 39° west from Washington. (Note: An act to organize the Territory of Nevada, Pub. L. 36–83, 12 Stat. 209)	Map of the change to the United States in central North America on March 2, 1861 Map of the change to the international disputes involving the United States in central North America on March 2, 1861
March 28, 1861	Representatives in the southern half of New Mexico Territory proclaimed an independent Arizona Territory south of 34° north.	Map of the change to the international disputes involving the United States in central North America on March 28, 1861
April 17, 1861	Following the Battle of Fort Sumter and President Abraham Lincoln's call for troops to respond, Virginia proclaimed its secession from the Union, withdrawing from Congress. However, the 1st (along the Eastern Shore), 7th (near Washington, D.C.), and 10th, 11th, and 12th (in the northwest of the state) congressional districts continued to send representatives to Congress.	Map of the change to the United States in central North America on April 17, 1861
May 6, 1861	Arkansas proclaimed its secession from the Union, withdrawing from Congress.	Map of the change to the United States in central North America on May 6, 1861
May 7, 1861	Virginia was admitted to the Confederate States. (Note: An act to admit the Commonwealth of Virginia as a member of the Confederate States of America, Provisional Confederate Cong., sess. 2, chp. 4, p. 104)	Map of the change to the international disputes involving the United States in central North America on May 7, 1861
May 20, 1861	Arkansas was admitted to the Confederate States. (Note: An act to admit the State of Arkansas into the Confederacy, Provisional Confederate Cong., sess. 2, chp. 30, p. 120) North Carolina proclaimed its secession from the Union, withdrawing from Congress. Kentucky declared itself neutral in the American Civil War.	Map of the change to the United States in central North America on May 20, 1861 Map of the change to the international disputes involving the United States in central North America on May 20, 1861
May 21, 1861	North Carolina was admitted to the Confederate States. (Note: The law admitting the state required a presidential proclamation before it was to take effect, (Note: An act to admit the State of North Carolina into the Confederacy, on a certain condition, Provisional Confederate Cong., sess. 2, chp. 25, p. 118) which sources say took place on May 21, 1861; the closest known primary document is a statement from Jefferson Davis on July 20 stating that the proclamation had been made.)	Map of the change to the international disputes involving the United States in central North America on May 21, 1861
June 6, 1861	Robert Williamson Steele, governor of Jefferson Territory, declared the territory disbanded and handed over the government to the first governor of Colorado Territory.	Map of the change to the United States in central North America on June 6, 1861
June 8, 1861	Tennessee proclaimed its secession from the Union, withdrawing from Congress. However, the 1st, 2nd, 3rd, and 4th congressional districts in the eastern half of the state continued to send representatives to Congress.	Map of the change to the United States in central North America on June 8, 1861
June 25, 1861	The federal government recognized the Restored Government of Virginia in Wheeling as the legitimate government of Virginia.	Map of the change to the United States in central North America on June 25, 1861
July 2, 1861	Tennessee was admitted to the Confederate States. (Note: An act to admit the State of Tennessee into the Confederacy, on a certain condition, Provisional Confederate Cong., sess. 2, chp. 26, p. 119; Proclamation of July 2, 1861, admitting Tennessee to the Confederate States)	Map of the change to the international disputes involving the United States in central North America on July 2, 1861
August 1, 1861	Following Confederate victory in the First Battle of Mesilla, Arizona Territory was proclaimed as part of the Confederate States.	Map of the change to the international disputes involving the United States in central North America on August 1, 1861
September 13, 1861	Following the Confederate occupation of Columbus, Kentucky, on September 3, 1861, the state abandoned neutrality and aligned with the Union government. (Note: Resolution in relation to the withdrawal of Confederate troops from Kentucky soil, 1861 Ky. Acts Res. 8, p. 110)	no change to map
October 31, 1861	A splinter government in Neosho, Missouri, proclaimed the secession of the state from the Union.	Map of the change to the international disputes involving the United States in central North America on October 31, 1861
November 20, 1861	A convention in Russellville, Kentucky, proclaimed the formation of a splinter government in Bowling Green and the secession of Kentucky from the Union.	Map of the change to the international disputes involving the United States in central North America on November 20, 1861
November 28, 1861	The splinter Neosho government of Missouri was admitted to the Confederate States. The Confederate States never held control over the state, but it was given full representation in the legislature. (Note: An act to admit the State of Missouri into the Confederacy, as a member of the Confederate States of America, Provisional Confederate Cong., sess. 5, chp. 1, p. 221)	Map of the change to the international disputes involving the United States in central North America on November 28, 1861
December 10, 1861	The splinter Bowling Green government of Kentucky was admitted to the Confederate States. Like Missouri, despite lack of control, it was given full representation in the legislature. (Note: An act for the admission of the State of Kentucky into the Confederate States of America, as a member thereof, Provisional Confederate Cong., sess. 5, chp. 5, p. 222)	Map of the change to the international disputes involving the United States in central North America on December 10, 1861
December 21, 1861	The Confederate States ratified treaties with the Great Osage Tribe, (Note: The treaty was signed October 2, (Note: Treaty with the Osages, signed October 2, 1861) and ratified December 21, 1861.) and the Seneca and Shawnee. (Note: The treaty was signed October 4, (Note: Treaty with the Senecas and Senecas and Shawnees, signed October 4, 1861) and ratified December 21, 1861.) (Note: The full description of the native party to the treaty was, "the Seneca tribe of Indians, formerly known as the Senecas of Sandusky, and the Shawnees of the tribe or confederacy of Senecas and Shawnees, formerly known as the Senecas and Shawnees of Lewistown, or the mixed bands of Senecas and Shawnees.")	Map of the change to the international disputes involving the United States in central North America on December 21, 1861
December 23, 1861	The Confederate States ratified treaties with the Cherokee Nation, (Note: The treaty was signed October 7, (Note: Treaty with the Cherokees, signed October 7, 1861) and ratified December 23, 1861.) granting them a delegate to the Congress of the Confederate States, and with the Seminole Nation, (Note: The treaty was signed August 1, (Note: Treaty with the Seminole Nation, signed August 1, 1861) and ratified December 23, 1861.) granting them a delegate to be shared with the Creek Nation.	Map of the change to the international disputes involving the United States in central North America on December 23, 1861
December 31, 1861	The Confederate States ratified treaties with the Choctaw Nation and Chickasaw Nation, (Note: The treaty was signed July 12, (Note: Treaty with Choctaws and Chickasaws, signed July 12, 1861) and ratified December 31, 1861.) granting them a shared delegate in the Congress of the Confederate States; with the Comanche; (Note: There were two treaties with the Comanche, one with the "Comanches and other Tribes and Bands" (Note: Treaty with the Comanches and other Tribes and Bands, signed August 12, 1861) (Note: The full description of the native party to the treaty was, "The Pen-e-tegh-ca Band of the Ne-um or Comanches, and the tribes and bands of the Wich-i-tas, Cado-Ha-da-chos, Hue-cos, Ta-hua-ca-ros, A-na-dagh-cos, Ton-ca-wes, Ai-o-nais, Ki-chais, Shawnees and Delawares, residing in the said leased country.") and one with the "Comanches of the Prairies and Staked Plain." (Note: Treaty with the Comanches of the Prairies and Staked Plain, signed August 12, 1861) (Note: The full description of the native party to the treaty was, "The No-co-ni, Ta-ne-i-weh, Ya-pa-rih-ca and Co-cho-tih-ca bands of the Ne-um, called by the white men the Comanches of the Prairies and the Staked Plain.") Both were signed on August 12, 1861, and ratified on December 31, 1861.) with the Creek Nation, (Note: The treaty was signed July 10, (Note: Treaty with the Creek Nation, signed July 10, 1861) and ratified December 31, 1861.) granting them a delegate shared with the Seminole Nation; and with the Quapaw. (Note: The treaty was signed October 4, (Note: Treaty with the Quapaws, signed October 4, 1861) and ratified December 31, 1861.)	Map of the change to the international disputes involving the United States in central North America on December 31, 1861
March 1, 1862	A decree by the Supreme Court modified the Massachusetts–Rhode Island border. (Note: The decree transferred land from the left bank of the Blackstone River to Rhode Island, including what is now East Providence, in exchange for land around Fall River being transferred to Massachusetts.)	Map of the change to the United States in central North America on March 1, 1862
April 15, 1862	Palmyra Atoll was annexed by Hawaii, after which the American claim fell dormant.	Map of the change to the United States in the Pacific Ocean on April 15, 1862
July 14, 1862	The slice of Utah Territory west of 38° west from Washington was assigned to Nevada Territory. (Note: An act to extend the territorial Limits of the Territory of Nevada, Pub. L. 37–173, 12 Stat. 575)	Map of the change to the United States in central North America on July 14, 1862
December 30, 1862	The Swan Islands were claimed under the Guano Islands Act.	Map of the change to the United States in the Caribbean Sea on December 30, 1862
February 24, 1863	Arizona Territory was organized from the half of New Mexico Territory west of 32° west from Washington. (Note: An act to provide a temporary government for the Territory of Arizona, and for other purposes, Pub. L. 37–56, 12 Stat. 664)	Map of the change to the United States in central North America on February 24, 1863
March 3, 1863	Idaho Territory was organized from the parts of Dakota Territory and Nebraska Territory west of 27° west from Washington, and the half of Washington Territory east of the Snake River and a line north from the mouth of the Clearwater River. (Note: An act to provide a temporary government for the Territory of Idaho, Pub. L. 37–117, 12 Stat. 808)	Map of the change to the United States in central North America on March 3, 1863
March 4, 1863	Because of disruption in voting and low turnout, no one was allowed to take the seats in the United States House of Representatives held by the Unionist areas of Louisiana, Tennessee, and Virginia, effectively expelling the states; Virginia maintained representation in the United States Senate.	Map of the change to the United States in central North America on March 4, 1863
June 20, 1863	The northwestern counties of Virginia, represented by the Restored Government of Virginia in Wheeling, were admitted as the thirty-fifth state, West Virginia. (Note: The Restored Government of Virginia gave its consent on May 13, 1862, the act admitting West Virginia was approved on December 31, 1862, (Note: An act for the admission of the State of "West Virginia" into the Union, and for other purposes, Pub. L. 37–6, 12 Stat. 633) and the president proclaimed on April 20, 1863, that it would become a state in sixty days. (Note: Proclamation admitting West Virginia as a State, 13 Stat. 731)) (Note: The Virginia counties that became West Virginia were: Barbour, Boone, Braxton, Brooke, Cabell, Calhoun, Clay, Doddridge, Fayette, Gilmer, Greenbrier, Hampshire, Hancock, Hardy, Harrison, Jackson, Kanawha, Lewis, Logan, McDowell, Marion, Marshall, Mason, Mercer, Monongalia, Monroe, Morgan, Nicholas, Ohio, Pendleton, Pleasants, Pocahontas, Preston, Putnam, Raleigh, Randolph, Ritchie, Roane, Taylor, Tucker, Tyler, Upshur, Wayne, Webster, Wetzel, Wirt, Wood, and Wyoming.) The Restored Government of Virginia was relocated to Alexandria.	Map of the change to the United States in central North America on June 20, 1863
August 5, 1863	Berkeley County was ceded by Virginia to West Virginia. (Note: The Restored Government of Virginia gave its consent on January 31, 1863, (Note: An act giving the consent of the State of Virginia to the County of Berkeley being admitted into and becoming part of the State of West Virginia, Restored 1862 Va. Acts, Dec. sess., chp. 54, p. 38) West Virginia accepted on August 5, 1863, (Note: An act admitting the County of Berkeley into, and making the same part of, this state, 1863 W.V. Acts chp. 35, p. 33) and the federal government consented after-the-fact on March 10, 1866. (Note: Joint Resolution giving the consent of Congress to the transfer of the Counties of Berkeley and Jefferson to the State of West Virginia, H.J. Res 12, 14 Stat. 350))	Map of the change to the United States in central North America on August 5, 1863
November 2, 1863	Jefferson County was ceded by Virginia to West Virginia. (Note: The Restored Government of Virginia gave its consent on February 4, 1863, (Note: An act giving consent to the admission of certain counties into the new State of West Virginia, upon certain conditions, Restored 1862 Va. Acts, Dec. sess., chp. 78, p. 65) West Virginia accepted on November 2, 1863, (Note: An act admitting the County of Jefferson into, and making the same part of, this state, 1863 W.V. Acts chp. 90, p. 103) and the federal government consented after-the-fact on March 10, 1866.)	Map of the change to the United States in central North America on November 2, 1863
May 26, 1864	Montana Territory was organized from the northeast third of Idaho Territory, (Note: The new Idaho Territory–Montana Territory border was, from the north: south along 39° west from Washington to the crest of the Bitterroot Range and the Rocky Mountains; then along that to the new tripoint with Dakota Territory.) and the southeast third of Idaho Territory was assigned to Dakota Territory. (Note: The new Dakota Territory–Idaho Territory border was, from the south: north along 33° west from Washington to the crest of the Rocky Mountains, then northwest along that to the new tripoint with Montana Territory.) (Note: An act to provide a temporary government for the Territory of Montana, Pub. L. 38–95, 13 Stat. 85)	Map of the change to the United States in central North America on May 26, 1864
October 31, 1864	Nevada Territory was admitted as the thirty-sixth state, Nevada. (Note: The northern border with Oregon would be surveyed in 1873 by the General Land Office.) (Note: An act to enable the people of Nevada to form a constitution and state government, and for the admission of such state into the Union on an equal footing with the original states, Pub. L. 38–36, 13 Stat. 30; Proclamation admitting Nevada into the Union, 13 Stat. 749)	Map of the change to the United States in central North America on October 31, 1864
May 5, 1865	The Confederate States cabinet met in Washington, Georgia, and dissolved. Military surrenders were scattered throughout 1865, but the most important is regarded as that of the Army of Northern Virginia following the Battle of Appomattox Court House on April 9.	Map of the change to the United States in central North America on May 5, 1865

== 1866–1897 (Reconstruction and western statehood) ==
Date	Event	Change map
May 5, 1866	The slice of Utah Territory west of 37° west from Washington was ceded to Nevada. (Note: The cession was approved by the federal government on May 5, 1866; (Note: An act concerning the boundaries of the State of Nevada, Pub. L. 39–73, 14 Stat. 43) the receipt of this specific grant was pre-approved in the Nevada constitution. (Note: Nev. Const. art. XIV))	Map of the change to the United States in central North America on May 5, 1866
July 24, 1866	Tennessee was readmitted to Congress. (Note: Joint Resolution restoring Tennessee to her relations to the Union, 14 Stat. 364)	Map of the change to the United States in central North America on July 24, 1866
December 13, 1866	The survey of the Florida–Georgia border was approved. (Note: The survey was approved by Florida on February 8, 1861, (Note: Resolution relating to the Florida and Georgia boundary line, 1860 Fla. Res. no. 16, p. 237) and by Georgia on December 13, 1866. (Note: Resolution in relation to the Florida boundary line, 1866 Ga. Res. no. 19, p. 221) The federal government would acknowledge the surveyed border on April 9, 1872. (Note: An act to settle and quiet the titles to lands along the boundary line between the States of Georgia and Florida, Pub. L. 42–91, 17 Stat. 52))	Map of the change to the United States in central North America on December 13, 1866
December 26, 1866	Starbuck Island was claimed by the United Kingdom.	Map of the change to the United States in the Pacific Ocean on December 26, 1866
January 18, 1867	The northwestern corner of Arizona Territory, west of the Colorado River and 37° west from Washington, was ceded to Nevada. (Note: The cession was approved by the federal government on May 5, 1866, and accepted by Nevada on January 18, 1867. (Note: Joint Resolution in relation to the boundaries of the State of Nevada, and the acceptance of additional territory, ceded by the United States to this State, 1867 Nev. Stat. no. 9, p. 145)) (Note: The survey of the full eastern border would be completed on December 26, 1870.)	Map of the change to the United States in central North America on January 18, 1867
March 1, 1867	Nebraska Territory was admitted as the thirty-seventh state, Nebraska. (Note: An act to enable the people of Nebraska to form a constitution and state government, and for the admission of such state into the Union on an equal footing with the original states, Pub. L. 38–59, 13 Stat. 47; An act for the admission of the State of Nebraska into the Union, Pub. L. 39–36, 14 Stat. 391; Proclamation admitting Nebraska as a State, 14 Stat. 820)	Map of the change to the United States in central North America on March 1, 1867
July 1, 1867	Canada was formed from several British colonies, including New Brunswick, inheriting the dispute over Machias Seal Island and North Rock.	Map of the change to the international disputes involving the United States in central North America on July 1, 1867
August 28, 1867	Midway Atoll was claimed. (Note: S. Rept. 40-194, p. 1)	Map of the change to the United States in the Pacific Ocean on August 28, 1867
October 18, 1867	Alaska was purchased from the Russian Empire and designated the Department of Alaska. (Note: The treaty was signed March 30, ratified May 28, and entered into force June 20, 1867. (Note: Treaty on the Cession of Alaska, with Russia, T.S. 301, 15 Stat. 539) The cession was formally handed over on October 18, 1867.) (Note: The borders of the Department of Alaska were, from the Dixon Entrance: Up the Portland Channel to 56° north; then along the "summit of the mountains situated parallel to the coast" (the definition of which was disputed) to 141° west; then north.) A vague description and lack of quality surveying made the southeastern border with British holdings unclear and disputed.	Map of the change to the United States in northwest North America on October 18, 1867
June 22, 1868	Arkansas was readmitted to Congress. (Note: An act to admit the State of Arkansas to representation in Congress, Pub. L. 40–69, 15 Stat. 72)	Map of the change to the United States in central North America on June 22, 1868
June 25, 1868	Florida was readmitted to Congress. (Note: The readmission was contingent on Florida ratifying the Fourteenth Amendment to the United States Constitution; (Note: An act to admit the States of North Carolina, South Carolina, Louisiana, Georgia, Alabama, and Florida, to representation in Congress, Pub. L. 40–70, 15 Stat. 73) they were proclaimed on July 11, 1868, to have done so before the readmission act's passage. (Note: Proclamation no. 7 readmitting Florida and North Carolina, 15 Stat. 703))	Map of the change to the United States in central North America on June 25, 1868
July 4, 1868	North Carolina was readmitted to Congress. (Note: The readmission was contingent on North Carolina ratifying the Fourteenth Amendment to the United States Constitution; they were proclaimed on July 11, 1868, to have done so on July 4, 1868.)	Map of the change to the United States in central North America on July 4, 1868
July 9, 1868	Louisiana and South Carolina were readmitted to Congress. (Note: The readmissions were contingent on the states ratifying the Fourteenth Amendment to the United States Constitution; they were proclaimed on July 18, 1868, to have done so on July 9, 1868. (Note: Proclamation no. 8 readmitting South Carolina, 15 Stat. 704; Proclamation no. 9 readmitting Louisiana, 15 Stat. 705)) Caroline Island was claimed by the United Kingdom.	Map of the change to the United States in central North America on July 9, 1868 Map of the change to the United States in the Pacific Ocean on July 9, 1868
July 13, 1868	Alabama was readmitted to Congress. (Note: The readmission was contingent on Alabama ratifying the Fourteenth Amendment to the United States Constitution; they were proclaimed on July 20, 1868, to have done so on July 13, 1868. (Note: Proclamation no. 10 readmitting Alabama, 15 Stat. 705))	Map of the change to the United States in central North America on July 13, 1868
July 21, 1868	Georgia was readmitted to Congress. (Note: The readmission was contingent on Georgia ratifying the Fourteenth Amendment to the United States Constitution; they were proclaimed on July 27, 1868, to have done so on July 21, 1868. (Note: Proclamation no. 12 readmitting Georgia, 15 Stat. 708))	Map of the change to the United States in central North America on July 21, 1868
July 25, 1868	Wyoming Territory was organized from portions of Dakota, Idaho, and Utah Territories. (Note: The organic act specified it would take effect after the territorial government was organized; (Note: An act to provide a temporary government for the Territory of Wyoming, Pub. L. 40–235, 15 Stat. 178) while this would not occur until May 19, 1869, all sources use July 25, 1868, as the creation date.) (Note: The borders of Wyoming Territory were parallels 41° north and 45° north, and Washington meridians 27° west and 34° west.) A tiny portion of the Dakota Territory was erroneously left behind on the western side of Wyoming Territory.	Map of the change to the United States in central North America on July 25, 1868
August 12, 1868	The list of bonded guano island claims mentions "Islands in Caribbean Sea not named" bonded on this date, but it is unknown to what this is referring.	no change to map
December 11, 1868	Serrana Bank was claimed under the Guano Islands Act. Colombia has claimed it throughout its history.	Map of the change to the United States in the Caribbean Sea on December 11, 1868
March 3, 1869	Georgia was again expelled from Congress; the representatives elected in April 1868 to serve in the last few months of the 40th United States Congress attempted to present the same credentials to the 41st United States Congress, but were denied.	Map of the change to the United States in central North America on March 3, 1869
November 22, 1869	Bajo Nuevo Bank, Pedro Cays, Quita Sueño Bank, and Roncador Bank were claimed under the Guano Islands Act. (Note: Pedro Cays was bonded under the name "Petrel Island.") Colombia has claimed all but Pedro Cays throughout its history.	Map of the change to the United States in the Caribbean Sea on November 22, 1869
January 26, 1870	Virginia was readmitted to Congress. (Note: An act to admit the State of Virginia to representation in the Congress of the United States, Pub. L. 41–10, 16 Stat. 62)	Map of the change to the United States in central North America on January 26, 1870
February 23, 1870	Mississippi was readmitted to Congress. (Note: An act to admit the State of Mississippi to representation in the Congress of the United States, Pub. L. 41–19, 16 Stat. 67)	Map of the change to the United States in central North America on February 23, 1870
March 30, 1870	Texas was readmitted to Congress. (Note: An act to admit the State of Texas to representation in the Congress of the United States, Pub. L. 41–39, 16 Stat. 80)	Map of the change to the United States in central North America on March 30, 1870
July 15, 1870	Georgia was again readmitted to Congress. (Note: Additional requirements had been made of Georgia to complete Reconstruction, including ratifying the Fifteenth Amendment to the United States Constitution; (Note: An act to promote the reconstruction of the State of Georgia, Pub. L. 41–3, 16 Stat. 59) having done so, they were readmitted. (Note: An act relating to the State of Georgia, Pub. L. 41–299, 16 Stat. 363)) The North-Western Territory was ceded by the United Kingdom to Canada, including its portion of the Alaska boundary dispute.	Map of the change to the United States in central North America on July 15, 1870 Map of the change to the United States in northwest North America on July 15, 1870
February 9, 1871	A small parcel was ceded from Dakota Territory to Nebraska following a sudden change in course of the Missouri River. (Note: The cession was approved by the federal government on April 28, 1870, (Note: An act to re-define a portion of the boundary line between the State of Nebraska and the Territory of Dakota, Pub. L. 41–64, 16 Stat. 93) and accepted by Nebraska on February 9, 1871. (Note: An act to approve an act to re-define a portion of the boundary line between the State of Nebraska, and the Territory of Dakota, 1871 Neb. Laws p. 131–132))	Map of the change to the United States in central North America on February 9, 1871
February 21, 1871	The District of Columbia was reorganized. (Note: An act to provide a government for the District of Columbia, Pub. L. 41–62, 16 Stat. 419)	no change to map
July 20, 1871	British Columbia joined Canada, including the dispute over the San Juan Islands as well as its portion of the Alaska boundary dispute.	Map of the change to the international disputes involving the United States in central North America on July 20, 1871 Map of the change to the United States in northwest North America on July 20, 1871
1872	Flint Island was claimed by the United Kingdom.	Map of the change to the United States in the Pacific Ocean sometime in 1872
October 21, 1872	The dispute with Canada over the San Juan Islands was resolved in the favor of the United States claim. (Note: Articles 34 and 35 of the Treaty of Washington (Note: Treaty of Amity (Treaty of Washington), T.S. 133, 17 Stat. 863) provided for the dispute to be arbitrated by Wilhelm I, who delivered his decision on October 21, 1872.)	Map of the change to the international disputes involving the United States in central North America on October 21, 1872
October 15, 1873	Vostok Island was claimed by the United Kingdom.	Map of the change to the United States in the Pacific Ocean on October 15, 1873
February 17, 1873	The small portion of Dakota Territory that was left behind when Wyoming Territory was created was assigned to Montana Territory. (Note: An act to readjust the western boundary of Dakota Territory, Pub. L. 42–147, 17 Stat. 464)	Map of the change to the United States in Central North America on February 17, 1873
May 29, 1876	The International Boundary Commission produced its final report on the survey of the 49th parallel north.	Map of the change to the United States in central North America on May 29, 1876
August 1, 1876	Colorado Territory was admitted as the thirty-eighth state, Colorado. (Note: The General Land Office surveyed the border with Nebraska in 1869, and with Kansas in 1872.) (Note: An act to enable the people of Colorado to form a constitution and State government, and for the admission of the said state into the Union on an equal footing with the original states, Pub. L. 43–139, 18 Stat. 474; Proclamation admitting Colorado as a State, 19 Stat. 665)	Map of the change to the United States in central North America on August 1, 1876
March 3, 1879	The Maryland–Virginia border across the Chesapeake Bay was adjusted, ceding the southern half of Smith Island to Virginia. (Note: An act giving the consent of Congress to an agreement or compact entered into between the States of Virginia and Maryland respecting the boundary between said states, Pub. L. 45–196, 20 Stat. 481)	Map of the change to the United States in central North America on March 3, 1879
September 8, 1879	Arenas Key (claimed by Mexico), the Morant Cays, and Serranilla Bank (claimed by Colombia) were claimed by the United States under the Guano Islands Act.	Map of the change to the United States in the Caribbean Sea on September 8, 1879
April 7, 1880	A very small area of Fair Haven, Vermont, was ceded to New York in response to a change in the course in the Poultney River. (Note: An act giving the consent of Congress to an agreement or compact entered into between the States of New York and Vermont respecting the boundary between said states, Pub. L. 46–49, 21 Stat. 72)	not mapped
September 13, 1880	Western Triangle Island, claimed by Mexico, was claimed by the United States under the Guano Islands Act. (Note: Two other islands were bonded on September 13, 1880: "De Anes", with the coordinates of Isla de Aves, but which was acknowledged by the United States in 1859 to belong to Venezuela, so it is assumed nothing ever came of this bond, and no further claim was ever made by the United States; and Serranilla Bank, being bonded a second time.)	Map of the change to the United States in the Caribbean Sea on September 13, 1880
May 23, 1882	The area between 43° north and the Keya Paha and Niobrara Rivers was ceded from Dakota Territory to Nebraska. (Note: The cession was approved by the federal government on March 18, 1882, (Note: An act to extend the northern boundary of the State of Nebraska, Pub. L. 47–52, 22 Stat. 35) and accepted by Nebraska on May 23, 1882. (Note: An act declaring the assent of the State of Nebraska to an act of Congress of the United States, entitled, "An act to extend the northern boundary of the State of Nebraska," approved March 28, 1882, 1882 Neb. Laws chp. 4, p. 56))	Map of the change to the United States in central North America on May 23, 1882
June 1, 1882	The Morant Cays and Pedro Cays were annexed by the United Kingdom to Jamaica, (Note: Letters Patent, dated March 3, 1882, for the annexation for Morant and Pedro Cays to the Island of Jamaica) after which the American claim fell dormant.	Map of the change to the United States in the Caribbean Sea on June 1, 1882
May 17, 1884	The Department of Alaska was organized as the District of Alaska. (Note: An act providing a civil government for Alaska, Pub. L. 48–53, 23 Stat. 24)	Map of the change to the United States in northwest North America on May 17, 1884
June 21, 1884	Scorpion Reef, claimed by Mexico, was claimed under the Guano Islands Act. (Note: Scorpion Reef was bonded under the name "Alacrans Islands, viz, Perez Island, Chica Island, and Pajoras Island.")	Map of the change to the United States in the Caribbean Sea on June 21, 1884
March 15, 1888	Fanning Island was claimed by the United Kingdom, after which the American claim fell dormant.	Map of the change to the United States in the Pacific Ocean on March 15, 1888
March 17, 1888	Christmas Island was claimed by the United Kingdom.	Map of the change to the United States in the Pacific Ocean on March 17, 1888
September 20, 1888	The United Kingdom proclaimed a protectorate over the Cook Islands, initiating a claim on Manihiki, Penrhyn, and Rakahanga. (Note: This is the date the protectorate was proclaimed on Rakahanga; Bryan says the islands were annexed on August 9, 1889.)	Map of the change to the United States in the Pacific Ocean on September 20, 1888
May 29, 1889	Washington Island was claimed by the United Kingdom, after which the American claim fell dormant.	Map of the change to the United States in the Pacific Ocean on May 29, 1889
June 3, 1889	Jarvis Island was claimed by the United Kingdom.	Map of the change to the United States in the Pacific Ocean on June 3, 1889
November 2, 1889	Dakota Territory was split along the "seventh standard parallel north", a few miles south of 46° north, and admitted as the thirty-ninth state, North Dakota, and the fortieth state, South Dakota. (Note: The General Land Office had surveyed the eastern border with Minnesota in 1860, and the southern border with Nebraska west of the Keya Paha River in 1874; and would survey east of the river in 1893, and the border between the new states in 1892.) (Note: An act to provide for the division of Dakota into two states and to enable the people of North Dakota, South Dakota, Montana, and Washington to form constitutions and state governments and to be admitted into the Union on an equal footing with the original states, and to make donations of public lands to such states, Pub. L. 50–180, 25 Stat. 676) (Note: Proclamation admitting North Dakota as a State, 26 Stat. 1548; Proclamation admitting South Dakota as a State, 26 Stat. 1549)	Map of the change to the United States in central North America on November 2, 1889
November 8, 1889	Montana Territory was admitted as the forty-first state, Montana. (Note: The General Land Office had surveyed the eastern border in 1885.) (Note: Proclamation admitting Montana as a State, 26 Stat. 1551)	Map of the change to the United States in central North America on November 8, 1889
November 11, 1889	Washington Territory was admitted as the forty-second state, Washington. (Note: The General Land Office had surveyed the southern border in 1864.) (Note: Proclamation admitting Washington as a State, 26 Stat. 1552)	Map of the change to the United States in central North America on November 11, 1889
May 2, 1890	Oklahoma Territory was organized from the Public Land Strip and the western half of Indian Territory, except for the Cherokee Outlet, which would be added later upon cession from the Cherokee. (Note: The new Oklahoma Territory–federal border was, from where the Red River meets 98° west: north to the Canadian River; down that to Seminole land; north along that border to the North Canadian River; down that to Creek land; north and east along that border to 96° west; then north. This omits the Cherokee Outlet, whose complex borders separated the main portion of Oklahoma Territory from the former Public Land Strip.) (Note: An act to provide a temporary government for the Territory of Oklahoma, to enlarge the jurisdiction of the United States Court in the Indian Territory, and for other purposes, Pub. L. 51–182, 26 Stat. 81)	Map of the change to the United States in central North America on May 2, 1890
July 3, 1890	Idaho Territory was admitted as the forty-third state, Idaho. (Note: The General Land Office had surveyed the border with Oregon in 1868; the border with Nevada in 1873; the border with Washington in 1873, though it stopped short by one mile and would be completed in 1908; the eastern border with Wyoming in 1874; and would survey the linear border with Montana in 1899, and the montane border in 1906.) (Note: An act to provide for the admission of the State of Idaho into the Union, Pub. L. 51–656, 26 Stat. 215)	Map of the change to the United States in central North America on July 3, 1890
July 10, 1890	Wyoming Territory was admitted as the forty-fourth state, Wyoming. (Note: The General Land Office had surveyed the border with Nebraska in 1869; the southern border in 1873; the western border in 1874; the eastern border in 1877; and the northern border in 1880.) (Note: An act to provide for the admission of the State of Wyoming into the Union, and for other purposes, Pub. L. 51–664, 26 Stat. 222)	Map of the change to the United States in central North America on July 10, 1890
March 3, 1891	The survey of the New Mexico Territory–Texas and Public Land Strip–Texas borders was approved. (Note: An act to authorize the President of the United States, in conjunction with the State of Texas, to run and mark the boundary lines between the territories of the United States and the State of Texas, Pub. L. 35–92, 11 Stat. 310; An act making appropriations for sundry civil expenses of the government for the fiscal year ending June 30th, 1892, and for other purposes, Pub. L. 51–542, 26 Stat. 971; Joint Resolution reaffirming the boundary line between Texas and the Territory of New Mexico, 36 Stat. 1454)	Map of the change to the United States in central North America on March 3, 1891
1892	Nassau and Pukapuka were made protectorates of the United Kingdom; (Note: The ship that proclaimed the protectorates voyaged from May to July 25, 1892; it is unknown what specific date the proclamations occurred on.) the American claim to Nassau fell dormant.	Map of the change to the United States in the Pacific Ocean in 1892
September 16, 1893	The federal government purchased the Cherokee Outlet in the Indian Territory and opened it to settlement, assigning it to Oklahoma Territory. (Note: The Oklahoma Organic Act provided that when the "interest of the Cherokee" in the land was extinguished, and proclaimed by the president, then the land would automatically become part of Oklahoma Territory. This was done via treaty, signed on December 19, 1891, and ratified on March 3, 1893. (Note: An act making appropriations for current and contingent expenses, and fulfilling treaty stipulations with Indian tribes, for fiscal year ending June 30th, 1894, Pub. L. 52–209, 27 Stat. 640) It was proclaimed by the president on August 19, 1893, to take effect on September 16, 1893. (Note: Proclamation opening Cherokee Outlet to settlement, 28 Stat. 1222))	Map of the change to the United States in central North America on September 16, 1893
November 17, 1894	Arenas Key, Scorpion Reef, and Western Triangle Island were stricken from the list of claimed guano islands.	Map of the change to the United States in the Caribbean Sea on November 17, 1894
January 4, 1896	Utah Territory was admitted as the forty-fifth state, Utah. (Note: The General Land Office had surveyed the border with Idaho in 1871; the east-west border with Wyoming in 1873 and the north-south border in 1874; and the eastern border in 1879.) (Note: An act to enable the people of Utah to form a constitution and state government, and to be admitted into the Union on an equal footing with the original states, Pub. L. 53–138, 28 Stat. 107; Proclamation admitting Utah as a State, 29 Stat. 876)	Map of the change to the United States in central North America on January 4, 1896
March 16, 1896	The dispute between the federal government, on behalf of Oklahoma Territory, and Texas over Greer County was resolved in favor of the federal claim. (Note: United States v. Texas, 162 U.S. 1 (1896))	Map of the change to the United States in central North America on March 16, 1896
July 24, 1897	An island was ceded by Nebraska to South Dakota to account for an earlier shift in the course of the Missouri River. (Note: An act to give the consent of Congress to a compact entered into between the States of South Dakota and Nebraska respecting the boundary between said states, Pub. L. 55–12, 30 Stat. 214)	Map of the change to the United States in central North America on July 24, 1897

== 1898–1945 (Pacific and Caribbean expansion) ==
Date	Event	Change map
August 12, 1898	The Republic of Hawaii was annexed. (Note: The Newlands Resolution to annex Hawaii was approved on July 7, 1898, (Note: Joint Resolution to provide for annexing the Hawaiian Islands to the United States, 30 Stat. 750) and the formal turnover occurred on August 12, 1898.)	Map of the change to the United States in the Pacific Ocean on August 12, 1898
January 17, 1899	Wake Island was claimed.	Map of the change to the United States in the Pacific Ocean on January 17, 1899
April 11, 1899	Guam, Porto Rico, and, for a payment of $20 million, the Philippines, were ceded by Spain following the Spanish–American War. (Note: The treaty was signed December 10, 1898, ratified February 6, 1899, and entered into force April 11, 1899. (Note: Treaty of Peace, with Spain, T.S. 343, 30 Stat. 1754)) The Insular Government of the Philippine Islands was claimed by the First Philippine Republic, and the ceded region included the island of Palmas, which was administered by the Netherlands, though the overlap would not be noticed until 1906.	Map of the change to the United States in the Pacific Ocean on April 11, 1899 Map of the change to the United States in the Caribbean Sea on April 11, 1899
February 16, 1900	The Samoan Islands east of 171° west were acquired per the terms of the Tripartite Convention. (Note: The treaty was signed December 2, 1899, ratified February 13, 1900, and entered into force February 16, 1900. (Note: Convention on Adjustment of Jurisdiction in Samoa, with Germany and the United Kingdom, T.S. 314, 31 Stat. 1878) The chiefs of the two island groups signed their own treaties with the United States, formally ceding themselves: Tutuila on April 17, 1900, (Note: Treaty of Cession of Tutuila and Aunuʻu, signed April 17, 1900) and Manuʻa on July 16, 1904. (Note: Treaty of Cession of Manu’a Islands, signed July 16, 1904) The treaties would not be ratified until February 20, 1929. (Note: Joint Resolution to provide for accepting, ratifying, and confirming the cessions of certain islands of the Samoan group to the United States, and for other purposes, Pub. Res. 70–89, 45 Stat. 1253))	Map of the change to the United States in the Pacific Ocean on February 16, 1900
February 19, 1900	The newly acquired Samoan islands were placed under the jurisdiction of the Department of the Navy, (Note: Executive Order no. 125-A, Placing Certain Islands of the Samoan Group Under the Control of the Navy Department, February 19, 1900) which designated them Naval Station, Tutuila. (Note: General Order Navy Department no. 540, February 19, 1900)	Map of the change to the United States in the Pacific Ocean on February 19, 1900
May 1, 1900	Porto Rico was organized. (Note: An act temporarily to provide revenues and a civil government for Porto Rico, and for other purposes, Pub. L. 56–191, 31 Stat. 77)	Map of the change to the United States in the Caribbean Sea on May 1, 1900
June 14, 1900	The former Republic of Hawaii was organized as Hawaii Territory. (Note: An act to provide a government for the Territory of Hawaii, Pub. L. 56–339, 31 Stat. 141)	Map of the change to the United States in the Pacific Ocean on June 14, 1900
March 3, 1901	The north half of Main Street between Bristol, Tennessee, and Bristol, Virginia, was ceded by Tennessee to Virginia, setting the border to run down the center of the road. (Note: The cession was made by Tennessee on January 28, 1901, (Note: An act to cede to the State of Virginia a certain narrow strip of territory belonging to the State of Tennessee lying between the northern boundary line of the City of Bristol, in the County of Sullivan, and the southern boundary line of the City of Bristol, in the County of Washington, State of Virginia, being the northern half of Main Street, of the said two cities, 1901 Tenn. Acts chp. 85, p. 128) accepted by Virginia on February 9, 1901, (Note: An act to accept the cession by the State of Tennessee to the State of Virginia, of a certain narrow strip of territory claimed as belonging to the State of Tennessee, and described as lying between the northern boundary line of the City of Bristol, in the County of Sullivan, State of Tennessee, and the southern boundary line of the City of Bristol, in the County of Washington, State of Virginia, being the northern half of the Main Street of the said two cities, 1901 Va. Acts chp. 59, p. 57) and approved by the federal government on March 3, 1901. (Note: Joint Resolution ratifying agreement between Tennessee and Virginia with reference to the boundary line of said states, 31 Stat. 1465))	not mapped
March 23, 1901	Several islands, including Cagayan de Sulu and Sibutu, were purchased from Spain and assigned to the Philippines. (Note: The treaty was signed November 7, 1900, ratified January 30, 1901, and entered into force March 23, 1901. (Note: Treaty on the Cession of Outlying Islands of the Philippines, with Spain, T.S. 345, 31 Stat. 1942)) (Note: The borders specified in 1898 had excluded these islands; the new treaty simply ceded "any and all islands belonging to the Philippine Archipelago" which Spain controlled at the time.)	Map of the change to the United States in the Pacific Ocean on March 23, 1901
April 19, 1901	The president of the First Philippine Republic, Emilio Aguinaldo, captured on March 23, 1901, took an oath of allegiance to the United States, ending the First Philippine Republic.	Map of the change to the United States in the Pacific Ocean on April 19, 1901
July 1, 1902	The Philippines were organized. (Note: An act temporarily to provide for the administration of the affairs of civil government in the Philippine Islands, and for other purposes, Pub. L. 57–235, 32 Stat. 691)	Map of the change to the United States in the Pacific Ocean on July 1, 1902
February 27, 1903	The survey of the California–Nevada border was approved. (Note: The survey was approved by California on March 1, 1901, (Note: An act to define and establish a portion of the eastern boundary of the State of California, 1901 Cal. Acts chp. 73, p. 89) and by Nevada on February 27, 1903. (Note: An act to define and establish a portion of the western boundary of the State of Nevada, 1903 Nev. Acts chp. 15, p. 38))	Map of the change to the United States in central North America on February 27, 1903
October 20, 1903	The Alaska boundary dispute with Canada was resolved, generally in favor of the United States claim.	Map of the change to the United States in northwest North America on October 20, 1903
December 10, 1903	An area along southern Guantánamo Bay was leased in perpetuity from Cuba for use as a naval base. (Note: The treaty was signed May 22, 1903, ratified June 25, 1904, and entered into force July 1, 1904. (Note: Treaty of Relations, with Cuba, T.S. 437, 33 Stat. 2248) The formal handover occurred on December 10, 1903.)	Map of the change to the United States in the Caribbean Sea on December 10, 1903
May 19, 1904	The Panama Canal Zone was granted by Panama; (Note: The treaty was signed November 18, 1903, ratified February 25, 1904, and entered into force February 26, 1904. (Note: Isthmian Canal Convention, with Panama, T.S. 431, 33 Stat. 2234) The agreement on the boundaries of the zone, signed June 15, 1904, stated that Panama had delivered the zone on May 19, 1904.) (Note: Only the basic borders were defined: a zone extending five miles from the middle of the canal on each side, excluding the cities of Colón and Panama City.) as Panama had just seceded, it was claimed by Colombia.	Map of the change to the United States in the Caribbean Sea on May 4, 1904
December 12, 1904	The maritime border of the harbor of Panama City was defined. (Note: Notes were exchanged on December 3, 1904, and the agreement became effective on December 12, 1904.)	not mapped
February 10, 1905	A small area on the east side of the Poteau River near Fort Smith was ceded from Indian Territory to Arkansas. (Note: An act to extend the western boundary line of the State of Arkansas, Pub. L. 58–67, 33 Stat. 714)	not mapped
September 26, 1907	New Zealand became largely independent from the United Kingdom, inheriting the claim on the atolls of Manihiki, Penrhyn, Pukapuka, and Rakahanga.	Map of the change to the United States in the Pacific Ocean on September 26, 1907
November 16, 1907	Indian Territory and Oklahoma Territory were combined and admitted as the forty-sixth state, Oklahoma. (Note: The General Land Office had surveyed the border with Kansas in 1857, and with Colorado in 1859.) (Note: An act to enable the people of Oklahoma and of the Indian Territory to form a constitution and state government and be admitted into the Union on an equal footing with the original states; and to enable the people of New Mexico and of Arizona to form a constitution and state government and be admitted into the Union on an equal footing with the original states, Pub. L. 59–234, 34 Stat. 267; Proclamation admitting Oklahoma as a State, 35 Stat. 2160)	Map of the change to the United States in central North America on November 16, 1907
April 11, 1908	A treaty with the United Kingdom on behalf of Canada redefined their maritime borders, making Horseshoe Reef Lighthouse in Lake Erie contiguous with American waters.	not mapped
January 1, 1909	The new Constitution of Michigan included some area of Wisconsin within its definition of Michigan. (Note: Michigan v. Wisconsin, 270 U.S. 295 (1926))	Map of the change to the United States in central North America on January 1, 1909
February 21, 1910	The Supreme Court ruled that the Maryland–West Virginia border followed the Deakins Line, surveyed around 1788 but disputed by Virginia and West Virginia. (Note: Maryland v. West Virginia, 217 U.S. 1 (1918))	Map of the change to the United States in central North America on February 21, 1910
August 20, 1910	A treaty with the United Kingdom on behalf of Canada refined the maritime border in Passamaquoddy Bay; (Note: The treaty was signed May 21, ratified July 13, and entered into force August 20, 1910. (Note: Treaty of Boundaries in Passamaquoddy Bay, with the United Kingdom, T.S. 551, 36 Stat. 2477)) the border ran through Pope's Folly Island, and was adjusted to run east of the island.	not mapped
July 7, 1911	United States Naval Station, Tutuila, was renamed American Samoa; (Note: No primary documentation has been found; secondary sources indicate this happened on July 7 or July 17, 1911.) the naval station itself continued to operate under that name.	Map of the change to the United States in the Pacific Ocean on July 7, 1911
January 6, 1912	New Mexico Territory was admitted as the forty-seventh state, New Mexico. (Note: The General Land Office had surveyed the northern border in 1868, and the border with Oklahoma in 1874.) (Note: An act to enable the people of New Mexico to form a constitution and state government and be admitted into the Union on an equal footing with the original States; and to enable the people of Arizona to form a constitution and state government and be admitted into the union on an equal footing with the original States, Pub. L. 61–219, 36 Stat. 557; Joint Resolution to admit the Territories of New Mexico and Arizona as states into the Union upon an equal footing with the original states, 37 Stat. 39) (Note: Proclamation admitting New Mexico as a State, 37 Stat. 1723)	Map of the change to the United States in central North America on January 6, 1912
February 14, 1912	Arizona Territory was admitted as the forty-eighth state, Arizona. (Note: The General Land Office had surveyed the eastern border in 1875, and the northern border in 1901.) (Note: Proclamation admitting Arizona as a State, 37 Stat. 1728)	Map of the change to the United States in central North America on February 14, 1912
August 24, 1912	The District of Alaska was reorganized as Alaska Territory. (Note: An act to create a legislative assembly in the Territory of Alaska, to confer legislative power thereon, and for other purposes, Pub. L. 62–334, 37 Stat. 512)	Map of the change to the United States in northwest North America on August 24, 1912
February 11, 1915	The borders of the Panama Canal Zone were explicitly defined. (Note: The treaty was signed September 2, 1914, ratified January 4, 1915, and entered into force February 11, 1915; (Note: Canal Zone Boundary Convention, with Panama, T.S. 610, 38 Stat. 1893) one contemporary news source says that ownership was formally transferred on May 1, 1915.) (Note: The treaty concretely defined the previous simple borders, with the main changes being: a slice of Canal Zone was ceded to Panama so Panama City would be connected with the rest of the country; the middle island of the Las Tres Hermanas Islands, which marked the edge of Panama City's harbor, was made wholly part of Canal Zone; and Gatun Lake and other surrounding waters were annexed, as well as an area of northwest Colón.)	Map of the change to the United States in the Caribbean Sea on February 11, 1915
May 27, 1915	An area around the mouth of the Rio Chagres was annexed to the Panama Canal Zone.	not mapped
December 8, 1915	The region between the Rio Chagres and Caribbean Sea was annexed to the Panama Canal Zone.	not mapped
June 22, 1916	The Corn Islands were leased from Nicaragua for a period of 99 years; (Note: The treaty was signed August 5, 1914, ratified June 19, 1916, and entered into force June 22, 1916. (Note: Bryan–Chamorro Treaty, with Nicaragua, T.S. 624, 39 Stat. 1661)) however, this was not a full transfer of sovereignty, and the islands were never administered as an insular area.	Map of the change to the United States in the Caribbean Sea on June 22, 1916
August 29, 1916	The Philippines were reorganized. (Note: An act to declare the purpose of the people of the United States as to the future political status of the people of the Philippine Islands, and to provide a more autonomous government for those islands, Pub. L. 64–240, 39 Stat. 545)	no change to map
March 2, 1917	Porto Rico was reorganized. (Note: An act to provide a civil government for Porto Rico, and for other purposes, Pub. L. 64–368, 39 Stat. 951)	no change to map
March 31, 1917	The Danish West Indies were purchased from Denmark, becoming the United States Virgin Islands. (Note: The treaty was signed August 4, 1916, ratified January 16, 1917, and entered into force January 17, 1917; (Note: Treaty of Cession of Danish West Indies, with Denmark, T.S. 629, 39 Stat. 1706) the payment was proclaimed to have been made on March 31, 1917. (Note: Proclamation of payment for cession of the Danish West Indies, 40 Stat. 1649)) (Note: Water Island was privately owned at the time, and was purchased by the federal government in 1944 for defensive use. It was transferred to the Department of the Interior in 1952, and to local territorial jurisdiction in phases beginning December 12, 1996.)	Map of the change to the United States in the Caribbean Sea on March 31, 1917
July 12, 1918	A small parcel was annexed from Punta Paitilla in Panama City to the Panama Canal Zone.	not mapped
August 21, 1918	A region between the Rio Chagres and the Quebrada Majagual was annexed to the Panama Canal Zone.	Map of the change to the United States in the Caribbean Sea on August 21, 1918
September 13, 1918	Minnesota and Wisconsin exchanged islands in the Mississippi River, ceding Island Seventytwo to Winona, Minnesota, and Barron's Island to La Crosse, Wisconsin. (Note: An act to approve mutual cessions of territory by the States of Wisconsin and Minnesota and the consequent changes in the boundary line between said states, Pub. L. 65–214, 40 Stat. 959)	not mapped
December 15, 1918	The survey of the Alaska–Canada border along 141° west was submitted.	Map of the change to the United States in northwest North America on December 15, 1918
September 18, 1919	Part of the island of Largo Remo and several nearby islands were annexed to the Panama Canal Zone.	Map of the change to the United States in the Caribbean Sea on September 18, 1919
June 16, 1920	A small area on the island of Taboga Island was annexed to the Panama Canal Zone.	not mapped
June 30, 1921	The "Wedge" dispute between Delaware and Pennsylvania was resolved in Delaware's favor. (Note: The cession was approved by Pennsylvania on June 22, 1897; (Note: An act providing for the acceptance, approval and confirmation of the report of the commission appointed in pursuance of the act approved [May 4, 1889], authorizing the examination, survey and re-establishment of the circle of New Castle, as the boundary line between Pennsylvania and Delaware, 1897 Pa. Laws no. 152, p. 182) accepted by Delaware on March 28, 1921; (Note: An act providing for the acceptance, approval, and confirmation of the report of the commission appointed in pursuance of the act of the General Assembly of the State of Delaware, approved [April 25, 1889], authorizing the examination, survey, and reestablishment of the circle of New Castle as the boundary line between Pennsylvania and Delaware, 1921 Del. Laws chp. 4, p. 7) and approved by the federal government on June 30, 1921. (Note: Joint Resolution ratifying the reestablishment of the boundary line between the States of Pennsylvania and Delaware, 42 Stat. 104)) The disputed area was a small region bounded on the west by Maryland, the north by the Mason–Dixon line that defined the southern border of Pennsylvania, and the west by the Twelve-Mile Circle that defined the border of Delaware, and became an issue after a survey in 1850 provisionally assigned it to Pennsylvania.	Map of the change to the United States in central North America on June 30, 1921
March 1, 1922	Colombia recognized the independence of Panama. (Note: The treaty was signed April 6, 1914, ratified January 11, 1922, and entered into force March 1, 1922. (Note: Treaty for the settlement of differences arising out of the events which took place on the Isthmus of Panama in November 1903, with Colombia, T.S. 661, 42 Stat. 2122, 9 LNTS 301))	Map of the change to the United States in the Caribbean Sea on March 1, 1922
October 8, 1923	Michigan expanded its claim to Wisconsin territory.	Map of the change to the United States in central North America on October 8, 1923
November 15, 1923	The Swan Islands were claimed by Honduras.	Map of the change to the United States in the Caribbean Sea on November 15, 1923
February 1, 1924	The future area for Madden Lake was annexed to the Panama Canal Zone.	Map of the change to the United States in the Caribbean Sea on February 1, 1924
March 4, 1925	Swains Island was assigned to American Samoa. (Note: Joint Resolution extending the sovereignty of the United States over Swains Island and making the island a part of American Samoa, 43 Stat. 1357)	Map of the change to the United States in the Pacific Ocean on March 4, 1925
July 17, 1925	The border with Canada was slightly adjusted. (Note: The treaty was signed February 24, ratified April 9, and entered into force July 17, 1925. (Note: Treaty on the Lake Superior–Lake of the Woods Boundary, with Canada, T.S. 720, 44 Stat. 2102)) (Note: The only change to a land border redefined how the border between the Lake of the Woods and the Rocky Mountains should be considered; previously, the border followed the curve of the parallel between each border monument, while the treaty changed this to straight lines between each monument. There was also a change to the border in the Lake of the Woods; a surveying anomaly caused the previous border to intersect itself several times in the lake, creating enclaves of United States water surrounded by Canadian water. The treaty changed the border to use the southernmost intersection as the northwestern point of the Lake of the Woods. Finally, the maritime border in the Bay of Fundy was adjusted.)	not mapped
March 1, 1926	The Supreme Court resolved the conflict between Michigan and Wisconsin in the favor of Wisconsin.	Map of the change to the United States in central North America on March 1, 1926
November 22, 1926	The Supreme Court defined the Michigan–Wisconsin border, transferring all islands south of the Quinnesec Falls on the Menominee River to Wisconsin, and all islands north of the falls to Michigan; however, an error in the border description introduced a small overlap between the two states over several islands in Lake Michigan north of the Door Peninsula. (Note: Michigan v. Wisconsin, 272 U.S. 398 (1926))	Map of the change to the United States in central North America on November 22, 1926
July 18, 1927	A small area of the islands of Taboga and Taboguilla were annexed to the Panama Canal Zone.	not mapped
October 26, 1927	Two bancos along the Colorado River were ceded from Mexico to Arizona.	not mapped
December 5, 1927	The "Country Club Dispute" between New Mexico and Texas, over the correct path of the Rio Grande in 1850, was resolved in Texas' favor. (Note: New Mexico v. Texas, 275 U.S. 279 (1927))	Map of the change to the United States in central North America on December 5, 1927
April 4, 1928	The Island of Palmas Case was decided in the favor of the Netherlands, ceding Palmas to the Dutch East Indies.	Map of the change to the United States in the Pacific Ocean on April 4, 1928
September 24, 1928	A small area near Las Minas Bay was annexed to the Panama Canal Zone.	not mapped
March 17, 1930	The survey of the Oklahoma–Texas border was approved by the Supreme Court. (Note: Oklahoma v. Texas, 281 U.S. 109 (1930))	Map of the change to the United States in Central North America on March 17, 1930
July 22, 1930	Small areas on Jicarita Island and at Punta Morro de Puercos were annexed to the Panama Canal Zone.	not mapped
April 15, 1931	A region around the soon-to-be-built Madden Dam was annexed to the Panama Canal Zone.	Map of the change to the United States in the Caribbean Sea on April 15, 1931
May 3, 1932	A small area in Punta Paitilla was ceded from the Panama Canal Zone to Panama. (Note: An act to authorize the modification of the boundary line between the Panama Canal Zone and the Republic of Panama, and for other purposes, Pub. L. 72–117, 47 Stat. 145)	not mapped
May 17, 1932	Porto Rico was renamed Puerto Rico. (Note: Joint Resolution to change the name of the island of "Porto Rico" to "Puerto Rico", 47 Stat. 158)	Map of the change to the United States in the Caribbean Sea on May 17, 1932
December 13, 1932	The Mangsee Islands and seven of the Turtle Islands were ceded by the United Kingdom to the Philippines. (Note: The treaty was signed January 2, 1930, ratified February 21, 1930, and entered into force December 13, 1932. (Note: Treaty on Boundaries of the Philippines and North Borneo, with the United Kingdom, T.S. 856, 47 Stat. 2198))	Map of the change to the United States in the Pacific Ocean on December 13, 1932
November 15, 1935	The Insular Government of the Philippine Islands was reorganized as the Commonwealth of the Philippines. (Note: An act to provide for the complete independence of the Philippine Islands, to provide for the adoption of a constitution and a form of government for the Philippine Islands, and for other purposes, Pub. L. 73–127, 48 Stat. 456; Proclamation 2148 on the establishment of the Commonwealth of the Philippines, 49 Stat. 3481)	Map of the change to the United States in the Pacific Ocean on November 15, 1935
March 16, 1936	The de jure overlap between Michigan and Wisconsin was resolved by the Supreme Court. (Note: Wisconsin v. Michigan, 297 U.S. 547 (1936))	Map of the change to the United States in central North America on March 16, 1936
May 13, 1936	Baker Island, Howland Island, and Jarvis Island were placed under the Department of the Interior, (Note: Executive Order no. 7368, Placing Certain Islands in the Pacific Ocean Under the Control and Jurisdiction of the Secretary of the Interior) after which the British claim to Jarvis Island fell dormant.	Map of the change to the United States in the Pacific Ocean on May 13, 1936
June 22, 1936	The United States Virgin Islands were organized. (Note: An act to provide a civil government for the Virgin Islands of the United States, Pub. L. 74–749, 49 Stat. 1807)	Map of the change to the United States in the Caribbean Sea on June 22, 1936
August 17, 1936	Malden Island was claimed by the United Kingdom. (Note: Malden Island had been mined by the British since the early 1860s, but was apparently never formally annexed; a British ship left a message on the island on August 17, 1936, proclaiming that it "belong[ed] to His Britannic Majesty.")	Map of the change to the United States in the Pacific Ocean on August 17, 1936
April 6, 1939	The condominium of the Canton and Enderbury Islands was established with the United Kingdom. (Note: Executive Agreement on Joint Administration of Canton and Enderbury Islands, EAS 145, 53 Stat. 2219)	Map of the change to the United States in the Pacific Ocean on April 6, 1939
July 27, 1939	Panama gained a sovereign corridor from the Panama Canal Zone connecting Colón with the rest of Panama, along with a three-dimensional "tube" of sovereignty for a future crossing over an American highway, and a corridor around the road from the Canal Zone border to Madden Dam was annexed to the Canal Zone. (Note: The treaty was signed March 2, 1936, ratified July 26, 1939, and entered into force July 27, 1939. (Note: Treaty of Friendship and Cooperation, with Panama, T.S. 945, 53 Stat. 1807))	Map of the change to the United States in the Caribbean Sea on July 27, 1939
August 16, 1939	This is the earliest known date for when the United States began claiming Fakaofo, Funafuti, Hull Island, Niulakita, Nukufetau, and Nukulaelae. At least Hull was claimed by the United Kingdom.	Map of the change to the United States in the Pacific Ocean on August 16, 1939
December 10, 1941	Governor George McMillin surrendered Guam to the Japanese military.	not mapped
December 23, 1941	The garrison on Wake Island surrendered to the Japanese military.	not mapped
March 26, 1942	The government of the Philippines evacuated in the face of Japanese advance; a government-in-exile would be established in Washington, D.C., on May 17, 1942.	not mapped
October 14, 1943	The Second Philippine Republic was established as a puppet state of Japan.	not mapped
August 10, 1944	Guam was captured from Japan.	not mapped
August 17, 1945	The Second Philippine Republic was dissolved; the process of re-establishing the Commonwealth government on Philippine soil had started on October 23, 1944.	not mapped
September 4, 1945	The Japanese garrison on Wake Island surrendered to the United States.	not mapped

== 1946–present (Decolonization) ==
Date	Event	Change map
July 4, 1946	The Commonwealth of the Philippines became independent as the Republic of the Philippines. (Note: The provisional agreement was signed on July 4, 1946, (Note: Provisional Agreement Between the United States of America and the Republic of the Philippines Concerning Friendly Relations and Diplomatic and Consular Representation, TIAS 1539, 60 Stat. 1800) and the final treaty was signed on July 4, 1946, ratified on August 16, 1946, and entered into force on October 22, 1946. (Note: Treaty of General Relations Between the United States of America and the Republic of the Philippines, TIAS 1568, 61 Stat. 1174)) (Note: Proclamation 2695 recognizing the independence of the Philippines, 60 Stat. 1352)	Map of the change to the United States in the Pacific Ocean on July 4, 1946
July 18, 1947	The Trust Territory of the Pacific Islands was entrusted by the United Nations. (Note: The territory was entrusted by the United Nations on April 2, 1947, (Note: Trusteeship Agreement for the Former Japanese Mandated Islands, TIAS 1665, 61 Stat. 3301) and accepted by the United States on July 18, 1947. (Note: Joint Resolution authorizing the President to approve the trusteeship agreement for the Territory of the Pacific Islands, Pub. L. 80–204, 61 Stat. 397))	Map of the change to the United States in the Pacific Ocean on July 18, 1947
January 1, 1949	The Tokelau Islands were incorporated into New Zealand, transferring the claims to Atafu, Fakaofo, and Nukunonu. (Note: Tokelau Act 1948.)	Map of the change to the United States in the Pacific Ocean on January 1, 1949
August 1, 1950	Guam was organized. (Note: An act to provide a civil government for Guam, and for other purposes, Pub. L. 81–630, 64 Stat. 384)	Map of the change to the United States in the Pacific Ocean on August 1, 1950
August 3, 1950	Kansas and Missouri exchanged small areas along the Missouri River due to shifts in the river following a flood in 1944. (Note: The exchange was approved by Kansas on February 22, 1949, by Missouri on December 19, 1949, (Note: An act authorizing the compromising and settling of a controversy between Missouri and Kansas over a part of the boundary between these states, 1949 Mo. Laws chp. 141, p. 311) and by the federal government on August 3, 1950. (Note: Joint Resolution giving the consent of Congress to an agreement between the State of Missouri and the State of Kansas establishing a boundary between said states, Pub. L. 81–637, 64 Stat. 397))	not mapped
November 26, 1951	The survey of the Alaska–Canada border along Alaska panhandle was submitted.	Map of the change to the United States in northwest North America on November 26, 1951
July 25, 1952	Puerto Rico adopted a constitution, becoming the Commonwealth of Puerto Rico. (Note: 57 FR 57093)	Map of the change to the United States in the Caribbean Sea on July 25, 1952
May 6, 1954	Alabama and Florida defined their border around the mouth of the Perdido River. (Note: The border was approved by Alabama on August 28, 1953, (Note: An act locating the boundary between the States of Florida and Alabama as defined by the constitution of each respective state, at the mouth of the Perdido River and adjacent thereto, 1953 Ala. Laws no. 440, p. 547) by Florida on June 12, 1953, (Note: An act locating the boundary between the States of Florida and Alabama, as defined by the constitutions of each respective state, at the mouth of the Perdido River and adjacent thereto, 1953 Fla. Laws chp. 28141, p. 462) and by the federal government on May 6, 1954. (Note: Joint Resolution giving the consent of Congress to an agreement between the State of Alabama and the State of Florida establishing a boundary between such states, Pub. L. 83–351, 68 Stat. 77))	not mapped
July 22, 1954	The United States Virgin Islands were reorganized. (Note: An act to revise the Organic Act of the Virgin Islands of the United States, Pub. L. 83–517, 68 Stat. 497)	no change to map
April 11, 1955	The corridor connecting Colón with the rest of Panama was adjusted, and several three-dimensional "tubes" of sovereignty were created, allowing Panamanian bridges to pass over the Panama Canal Zone. (Note: Convention regarding the Colón Corridor and certain other corridors through the Canal Zone, 6 UST 461, TIAS 3180, 241 UNTS 140, I-3430)	not mapped
August 23, 1955	Punta Paitilla, the area held on Taboga Island, and the remaining American holdings in Colón and Panama City were ceded to Panama. (Note: Treaty of mutual understanding and co-operation, 12 UST 301, TIAS 4716, 243 UNTS 211, I-3454)	Map of the change to the United States in the Caribbean Sea on August 23, 1955
January 3, 1959	Alaska Territory was admitted as the forty-ninth state, Alaska. (Note: An act to provide for the admission of the State of Alaska into the Union, Pub. L. 85–508, 72 Stat. 339; Proclamation admitting Alaska as a State, 73 Stat. c16)	Map of the change to the United States in northwest North America on January 3, 1959
August 21, 1959	Most of Hawaii Territory was admitted as the fiftieth state, Hawaii; (Note: An act to provide for the admission of the State of Hawaii into the Union, Pub. L. 86–3, 73 Stat. 4; Proclamation admitting Hawaii as a State, 73 Stat. c74) Palmyra Atoll remained a territory.	Map of the change to the United States in the Pacific Ocean on August 21, 1959
August 25, 1961	A small area cut off from Minnesota by flood control alterations to the Red River of the North was ceded to North Dakota. (Note: The cession was accepted by North Dakota on February 4, 1961, (Note: An act to accept the cession by the State of Minnesota to the State of North Dakota of certain parcels of real property and declaring an emergency, 1961 N.D. Laws chp. 318, p. 517) approved by Minnesota on April 10, 1961, (Note: An act relating to the cession by the State of Minnesota to the State of North Dakota of certain parcels of real property located in Clay County, Minnesota, 1961 Minn. Laws chp. 236, p. 399) and approved by the federal government on August 25, 1961. (Note: An act granting the consent of Congress to the compact or agreement between the States of North Dakota and Minnesota with respect to the boundary between such states, Pub. L. 87–162, 75 Stat. 399))	not mapped
January 14, 1964	The Chamizal, a tract between El Paso, Texas, and Ciudad Juárez, Chihuahua, was divided between the United States and Mexico. (Note: The convention was signed on August 29, 1963, ratified on December 20, 1963, and entered into force on January 14, 1964. (Note: Convention for the Solution of the Problem of the Chamizal, 15 UST 21, TIAS 5515, 505 UNTS 185, I-7374))	not mapped
August 4, 1965	The Cook Islands became self-governing from New Zealand, transferring the claims to Manihiki, Penrhyn, Pukapuka, and Rakahanga.	Map of the change to the United States in the Pacific Ocean on August 4, 1965
December 30, 1966	Land on Diego Garcia in the Indian Ocean was leased from the United Kingdom for use as a military base. (Note: Agreement on Availability of Certain Indian Ocean Islands for Defense Purposes, 18 UST 28, TIAS 6196, 603 UNTS 273, I-8737)	not mapped
April 25, 1971	The lease of the Corn Islands from Nicaragua was terminated. (Note: The convention was signed on July 14, 1970, ratified on February 26, 1971, and entered into force on April 25, 1971. (Note: Convention terminating the Convention of August 5, 1914, respecting a Nicaraguan canal route, 22 UST 663, TIAS 7120, 791 UNTS 305, I-11243))	Map of the change to the United States in the Caribbean Sea on April 25, 1971
September 1, 1972	The United States recognized the sovereignty of Honduras over the Swan Islands. (Note: The treaty was signed November 22, 1971, ratified July 1, 1972, and entered into force September 1, 1972. (Note: Treaty on the Swan Islands, with Honduras, 23 UST 2630, TIAS 7453, 851 UNTS 203, I-12199))	Map of the change to the United States in the Caribbean Sea on September 1, 1972
May 26, 1977	Several parcels were exchanged with Mexico along the Rio Grande under the terms of the Boundary Treaty of 1970, including the Horcón Tract, on which the town of Río Rico was located. (Note: The minute was signed on May 18, 1977, and approved by the parties on May 26, 1977.) (Note: Other changes included settling the border around the towns of Presidio, Texas, and Hidalgo, Texas, as well as Beaver Island near Roma, Texas.)	not mapped
December 16, 1977	The maritime border with Cuba was provisionally defined. (Note: The treaty was signed December 16, 1977, and provisionally entered into force January 1, 1978, but has not been ratified.)	Map of the change to the United States in the Caribbean Sea on December 16, 1977
October 1, 1978	Tuvalu became independent from the United Kingdom, transferring the claims to Funafuti, Nukufetau, Nukulaelae, and Niulakita.	Map of the change to the United States in the Pacific Ocean on October 1, 1978
July 12, 1979	The Republic of Kiribati became independent from the United Kingdom, transferring the claims to Birnie Island, Canton Island, Caroline Island, Christmas Island, Enderbury Island, Flint Island, Gardner Island, Hull Island, Malden Island, McKean Island, Phoenix Island, Starbuck Island, Sydney Island, and Vostok Island, and dissolving the condominium of the Canton and Enderbury Islands.	Map of the change to the United States in the Pacific Ocean on July 12, 1979
October 1, 1979	The Panama Canal Zone was ceded to Panama. (Note: The treaty was signed September 7, 1977, ratified June 15, 1978, and entered into force October 1, 1979. (Note: Panama Canal Treaty, with Panama, 33 UST 39, TIAS 10030, 1280 UNTS 3, I-21086)) The countries continued to share operational control of the canal until December 31, 1999, when it would be fully turned over to Panama. The United States retained control over several hundred small parcels that would be turned over in piecemeal fashion over time.	Map of the change to the United States in the Caribbean Sea on October 1, 1979
November 24, 1980	The maritime border with Venezuela was defined. (Note: The treaty was signed March 28, 1978, ratified October 10, 1980, and entered into force November 24, 1980. (Note: Maritime Boundary Treaty, with Venezuela, 32 UST 3100, TIAS 9890, 1273 UNTS 25, I-20984))	Map of the change to the United States in the Caribbean Sea on November 24, 1980
September 17, 1981	The claims to Quita Sueño Bank, Roncador Bank, and Serrana Bank were abandoned. (Note: The treaty was signed September 8, 1972, ratified August 24, 1981, and entered into force September 17, 1981. (Note: Treaty Concerning the Status of Quita Sueño, Roncador, and Serrana, with Colombia, 33 UST 1405, TIAS 10120, 1307 UNTS 379, I-21801))	Map of the change to the United States in the Caribbean Sea on September 17, 1981
March 10, 1983	An exclusive economic zone was proclaimed, extending up to 200 nautical miles. (Note: Proclamation 5030: Exclusive Economic Zone of the United States of America, 97 Stat. 1557)	not mapped
September 3, 1983	The maritime border with the New Zealand territory of Tokelau was defined, and their sovereignty was recognized over Atafu, Fakaofo, and Nukunonu. (Note: The treaty was signed December 2, 1980, ratified August 16, 1983, and entered into force September 3, 1983. (Note: Treaty on the Delimitation of the Maritime Boundary with Tokelau, with New Zealand, 35 UST 2073, TIAS 10775, 1643 UNTS 251, I-28231))	Map of the change to the United States in the Pacific Ocean on September 3, 1983
September 8, 1983	The maritime border with the Cook Islands was defined, and their sovereignty was recognized over Manihiki, Penrhyn, Pukapuka, and Rakahanga. (Note: The treaty was signed June 11, 1980, ratified August 16, 1983, and entered into force September 8, 1983. (Note: Treaty on Friendship and Delimitation of the Maritime Boundary, with the Cook Islands, 35 UST 2061, TIAS 10774, 1676 UNTS 223, I-28971))	Map of the change to the United States in the Pacific Ocean on September 8, 1983
September 23, 1983	The sovereignty of Kiribati was recognized over Birnie Island, Canton Island, Caroline Island, Christmas Island, Enderbury Island, Flint Island, Gardner Island, Hull Island, Malden Island, McKean Island, Phoenix Island, Starbuck Island, Sydney Island, and Vostok Island. (Note: The treaty was signed September 20, 1979, ratified August 16, 1983, and entered into force September 23, 1983. (Note: Treaty of Friendship, with Kiribati, 35 UST 2095, TIAS 10777, 1643 UNTS 239, I-28230)) The sovereignty of Tuvalu was recognized over Funafuti, Nukufetau, Nukulaelae, and Niulakita. (Note: The treaty was signed February 7, 1979, ratified August 16, 1983, and entered into force September 23, 1983. (Note: Treaty of Friendship, with Tuvalu, 35 UST 2087, TIAS 10776, 2011 UNTS 79, I-34500))	Map of the change to the United States in the Pacific Ocean on September 23, 1983
October 12, 1984	The International Court of Justice returned a judgment on the maritime border with Canada in the Gulf of Maine. (Note: Delimitation of the Maritime Boundary in the Gulf of Maine Area, 1984 I.C.J. 246)	not mapped
October 21, 1986	The Marshall Islands District of the Trust Territory of the Pacific Islands became an independent, freely associated state, as the Republic of the Marshall Islands. (Note: The compact of free association was signed on June 25, 1983, approved on January 14, 1986, (Note: Compact of Free Association Act of 1985, Pub. L. 99–239, 99 Stat. 1770) and entered into force on October 21, 1986. (Note: Proclamation 5564: Placing into Full Force and Effect the Covenant with the Commonwealth of the Northern Mariana Islands, and the Compacts of Free Association with the Federated States of Micronesia and the Republic of the Marshall Islands, 101 Stat. 2027)) The Marshall Islanders had claimed Wake Island since at least 1973.	Map of the change to the United States in the Pacific Ocean on October 21, 1986
November 3, 1986	The Chuuk, Pohnpei, and Yap Districts of the Trust Territory of the Pacific Islands became an independent, freely associated state, as the Federated States of Micronesia. (Note: The compact of free association was signed on October 1, 1982, approved on January 14, 1986, and entered into force on November 3, 1986.) The Mariana Islands District, having already established a covenant with the United States, (Note: The covenant was signed on February 15, 1975, approved on March 24, 1976, (Note: Joint Resolution to approve the "Covenant to establish a Commonwealth of the Northern Mariana Islands in political union with the United States of America," and for other purposes, Pub. L. 94–241, 90 Stat. 279) and entered into force on November 3, 1986.) remained a territory and became the Commonwealth of the Northern Mariana Islands.	Map of the change to the United States in the Pacific Ocean on November 3, 1986
June 15, 1990	The maritime border with the Soviet Union was provisionally defined. (Note: The treaty was signed June 1, 1990, and ratified September 16, 1991. (Note: Agreement on the maritime boundary, with the Soviet Union, Treaty 101-22) While never ratified by the Soviet Union or its successor state, Russia, the parties agreed to abide by the terms pending entry into force, effective June 15, 1990. (Note: Agreement between the United States of America and the Union of Soviet Socialist Republics to abide by the terms of the Maritime Boundary Agreement of 1 June 1990, pending entry into force, UNTS 40300))	Map of the change to the United States in northwest North America on June 15, 1990
December 22, 1990	The United Nations Security Council terminated the trusteeship over the Marshall Islands, Federated States of Micronesia, and Northern Mariana Islands. (Note: United Nations Security Council Resolution 683, UN Doc S/RES/683)	no change to map
July 5, 1994	The maritime border with Japan was defined. (Note: The Federal Register mentions an exchange of notes with Japan on July 5, 1994, (Note: 88 FR 88482) but no primary sourcing has been found.)	Map of the change to the United States in the Pacific Ocean on July 5, 1994
October 1, 1994	The remaining district of the Trust Territory of the Pacific Islands, the Palau District, became an independent, freely associated state, as the Republic of Palau. (Note: The compact of free association was signed on January 10, 1986, approved on November 14, 1986, (Note: Joint Resolution to approve the "Compact of Free Association" between the United States and the Government of Palau, and for other purposes, Pub. L. 99–658, 100 Stat. 3672) and entered into force on October 1, 1994. (Note: Joint Resolution to authorize entry into force of the Compact of Free Association between the United States and the Government of Palau, and for other purposes, Pub. L. 101–219, 103 Stat. 1870; Proclamation 6726, placing into full force and effect the Compact of Free Association with the Republic of Palau, 108 Stat. 5631))	Map of the change to the United States in the Pacific Ocean on October 1, 1994
November 10, 1994	The United Nations Security Council terminated the trusteeship over Palau, formally dissolving the Trust Territory of the Pacific Islands. (Note: United Nations Security Council Resolution 956, UN Doc S/RES/956)	no change to map
June 1, 1995	The maritime borders with territories of the United Kingdom in the Caribbean Sea were defined. (Note: The treaties were signed on November 5, 1993, ratified by the Senate on October 7, 1994, (Note: Two treaties with the United Kingdom establishing Caribbean Maritime Boundaries, Treaty 103-23) and entered into force on June 1, 1995. (Note: Treaty on the Delimitation in the Caribbean of a Maritime Boundary relating to the U.S. Virgin Islands and Anguilla, 1913 UNTS 59, I-32636; Treaty on the Delimitation in the Caribbean of a Maritime Boundary relating to Puerto Rico/U.S. Virgin Islands and the British Virgin Islands, 1913 UNTS 67, I-32637))	Map of the change to the United States in the Caribbean Sea on June 1, 1995
November 13, 1997	The maritime border with Mexico was defined. (Note: The treaty was signed May 4, 1978, ratified October 23, 1997, and entered into force November 13, 1997. (Note: Treaty on Maritime Boundaries, with Mexico, Treaty 96-6, 2143 UNTS 405, I-37399))	Map of the change to the United States in the Caribbean Sea on November 13, 1997
May 26, 1998	The Supreme Court ruled that reclaimed land added to Ellis Island since 1834 belonged to New Jersey; the 1834 boundary remained part of New York. (Note: New Jersey v. New York, 523 U.S. 767 (1998))	not mapped
December 31, 1999	All remaining parcels of the Panama Canal Zone were ceded to Panama.	not mapped
January 17, 2001	The maritime border with Mexico on the continental shelf in the western Gulf of Mexico beyond 200 nautical miles was defined. (Note: The treaty was signed June 9, 2000, ratified January 12, 2001, and entered into force January 17, 2001. (Note: Treaty on the delimination of the continental shelf in the western Gulf of Mexico beyond 200 nautical miles, with Mexico, Treaty 106-39, TIAS 01-117, 2143 UNTS 417, I-37400))	Map of the change to the United States in the Caribbean Sea on January 17, 2001
November 24, 2009	Texas and Mexico exchanged small parcels along the Rio Grande, with six islands being ceded to Mexico, and three islands and two bancos being ceded to Texas. (Note: The minute was signed on November 5, 2009, and approved by the parties on November 24, 2009.)	not mapped
October 7, 2014	The maritime border with Niue was defined. (Note: The treaty was signed May 13, 1997, ratified November 26, 2003, and entered into force October 7, 2014. (Note: Treaty on the Delimitation of a Maritime Boundary, with Niue, Treaty 105-53, TIAS 14-1007, 3016 UNTS 305, I-52440))	Map of the change to the United States in the Pacific Ocean on October 7, 2014
January 1, 2017	The North Carolina–South Carolina border was resurveyed.	not mapped
July 18, 2019	The maritime border with the Federated States of Micronesia was defined. (Note: The treaty was signed August 1, 2014, ratified March 27, 2019, and entered into force July 18, 2019. (Note: Treaty on the Delimitation of Maritime Boundaries, with Micronesia, Treaty 114-13, TIAS 19-718))	Map of the change to the United States in the Pacific Ocean on July 18, 2019
July 19, 2019	The maritime border with Kiribati was defined. (Note: The treaty was signed September 6, 2013, ratified March 27, 2019, and entered into force July 19, 2019. (Note: Treaty on the Delimitation of Maritime Boundaries, with Kiribati, Treaty 114-13, TIAS 19-719))	Map of the change to the United States in the Pacific Ocean on July 19, 2019
November 30, 2020	The State of Rhode Island and Providence Plantations adopted a constitutional amendment renaming itself the State of Rhode Island.	Map of the change to the United States in central North America on November 30, 2020

== Bancos along the Rio Grande ==
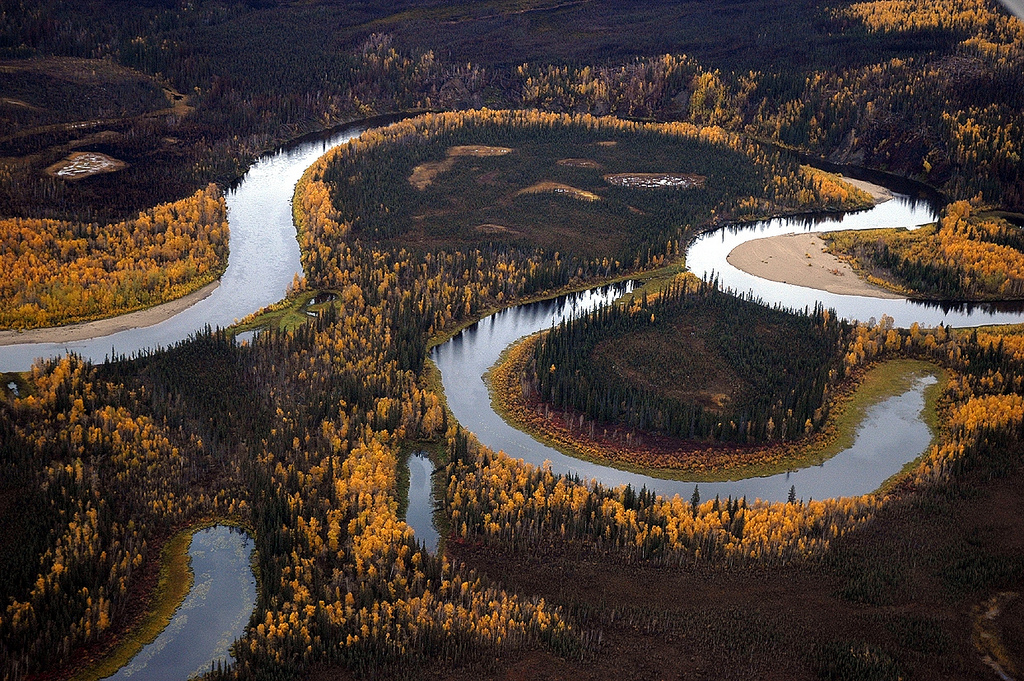
An example of a banco, created when a meander is cut off by a new, shorter channel, leaving a cut-off section of land surrounded by a U-shaped (oxbow) lake

The Banco Convention of 1905 between the United States and Mexico allowed, in the event of sudden changes in the course of the Rio Grande (as by flooding), for the border to be altered to follow the new course. The sudden changes often created bancos (land surrounded by bends in the river that became segregated from either country by a cutoff, often due to rapid accretion or avulsion of the alluvial channel), especially in the Lower Rio Grande Valley. When these bancos are created, the International Boundary and Water Commission investigates if land previously belonging to the United States or Mexico is to be considered on the other side of the border. In all cases of these adjustments along the Rio Grande under the 1905 convention, which occurred on 37 different dates from 1910 to 1976, the transferred land was minuscule (ranging from 1-acre (4,000 m^{2}) to 646 acres (261 ha)) and uninhabited.

== See also ==
- List of territorial disputes
- Geography of the United States
- Territories of the United States
- Historic regions of the United States
- American frontier
- List of U.S. state partition proposals
- List of U.S. states by date of admission to the Union
- Movements for the annexation of Canada to the United States
- Manifest destiny
- National Atlas of the United States
- Ostend Manifesto (annexation of Cuba)
- List of territorial claims and designations in Colorado
- Territorial evolution of Arizona
- Territorial evolution of California
- Territorial evolution of Idaho
- Territorial evolution of Montana
- Territorial evolution of Nevada
- Territorial evolution of New Mexico
- Territorial evolution of North Dakota
- Territorial evolution of Oregon
- Territorial evolution of South Dakota
- Territorial evolution of Utah
- Territorial evolution of Washington
- Territorial evolution of Wyoming
- Territories of the United States on stamps
- List of United States treaties § U.S.–Native American treaties

== Bibliography ==
- Bevans, Charles I., ed. (1968). Treaties and other International Agreements of the United States of America 1776–1949. Vol. 1. Washington, D.C.: Government Printing Office.
- Bevans, Charles I., ed. (1971a). Treaties and other International Agreements of the United States of America 1776–1949. Vol. 6. Washington, D.C.: Government Printing Office.
- Bevans, Charles I., ed. (1971b). Treaties and other International Agreements of the United States of America 1776–1949. Vol. 7. Washington, D.C.: Government Printing Office.
- Bevans, Charles I., ed. (1972a). Treaties and other International Agreements of the United States of America 1776–1949. Vol. 9. Washington, D.C.: Government Printing Office.
- Bevans, Charles I., ed. (1972b). Treaties and other International Agreements of the United States of America 1776–1949. Vol. 10. Washington, D.C.: Government Printing Office.
- Bevans, Charles I., ed. (1974a). Treaties and other International Agreements of the United States of America 1776–1949. Vol. 11. Washington, D.C.: Government Printing Office.
- Bevans, Charles I., ed. (1974b). Treaties and other International Agreements of the United States of America 1776–1949. Vol. 12. Washington, D.C.: Government Printing Office.
- Bowen, Clarence Winthrop (1882). The Boundary Disputes of Connecticut. Boston: James R. Osgood and Company.
- Bryan, Edwin H. (1942). American Polynesia and the Hawaiian Chain. Honolulu: Tongg Publishing Company.
- Carter, Clarence, ed. (1956). The Territorial Papers of the United States: The Territory of Florida. Vol. 22. Washington, D.C.: Government Printing Office.
- Clarke, H.W. (1886). Report of the Regents Boundary Commission upon the New York and Pennsylvania Boundary. Weed, Parsons and Company.
- Journal of the Confederate States of America, 1861–1865. Vol. 1. Washington, D.C.: Government Printing Office. 1904.
- Duffy, John J.; Hand, Samuel B.; Orth, Ralph H., eds. (2003). The Vermont Encyclopedia. University Press of New England. ISBN 978-1-58465-086-7.
- Fitzpatrick, John C., ed. (1933). Journals of the Continental Congress 1774-1789. Vol. 28. Washington, D.C.: Government Printing Office.
- Fitzpatrick, John C., ed. (1934). Journals of the Continental Congress 1774-1789. Vol. 31. Washington, D.C.: Government Printing Office.
- Hague, James D. (1862). "On the Phosphatic Guano Islands of the Pacific Ocean". American Journal of Science and Arts. Second. XXXIV (101). doi:10.5962/bhl.title.35160. LCCN 12013005. OCLC 17619374.
- Hill, Roscoe R., ed. (1936a). Journals of the Continental Congress 1774-1789. Vol. 32. Washington, D.C.: Government Printing Office.
- Hill, Roscoe R., ed. (1936b). Journals of the Continental Congress 1774-1789. Vol. 33. Washington, D.C.: Government Printing Office.
- Hunt, Gaillard, ed. (1914). Journals of the Continental Congress 1774-1789. Vol. 23. Washington, D.C.: Government Printing Office.
- Hunt, Gaillard, ed. (1928). Journals of the Continental Congress 1774-1789. Vol. 26. Washington, D.C.: Government Printing Office.
- Marsh, C.C., ed. (1922). Official Records of the Union and Confederate Navies in the War of the Rebellion. 2. Vol. 3. Washington, D.C.: Government Printing Office.
- Janvier, Louis Joseph (1886). Les Constitutions d'Haïti (1801-1885) (in French).
- Mathews, Catharine Van Cortlandt (1908). Andrew Ellicott, His Life and Letters. The Grafton Press.
- Matthews, James M. (1864). The Statutes at Large of the Provisional Government of the Confederate States of America. Richmond, Virginia: R.M. Smith.
- Maude, H.E. (1940). Western Pacific High Commission Report on the Phoenix and Line Islands with Special Reference to the Question of British Sovereignty (Report). Suva: F.W. Smith. hdl:2440/88870.
- McCain, William D. (1937). "Territorial Expropriation". The United States and the Republic of Panama. Durham, North Carolina: Duke University Press. pp. 144–159.
- Miller, Hunter, ed. (1931). Treaties and other International Acts of the United States of America. Vol. 2. Washington, D.C.: Government Printing Office.
- Miller, Hunter, ed. (1933). Treaties and other International Acts of the United States of America. Vol. 3. Washington, D.C.: Government Printing Office.
- Miller, Hunter, ed. (1934). Treaties and other International Acts of the United States of America. Vol. 4. Washington, D.C.: Government Printing Office.
- Miller, Hunter, ed. (1937). Treaties and other International Acts of the United States of America. Vol. 5. Washington, D.C.: Government Printing Office.
- Miller, Hunter, ed. (1942). Treaties and other International Acts of the United States of America. Vol. 6. Washington, D.C.: Government Printing Office.
- Moore, John Bassett, ed. (1906). A Digest of International Law. Vol. 1. Washington, D.C.: Government Printing Office. pp. 566–580.
- Memoria del Secretario de Relaciones Exteriores a la Asamblea Nacional en Sus Sesiones Ordinaries de 1916 (in Spanish). Panama City.
- Memoria que presenta el Secretario de Relaciones Exteriores a la Honorable Asamblea Nacional en Sus Sesiones Ordinaries de 1918 (in Spanish). Panama City.
- Paullin, Charles O. (1932). John K. Wright (ed.). Atlas of the Historical Geography of the United States. Washington, D.C.: Carnegie Institution., digital edition edited by Robert K. Nelson et al., 2013, accessed December 21, 2025.
- Paxson, Frederic L. (1906). "The Territory of Colorado". The American Historical Review. 12 (1): 53–65. doi:10.2307/1832884. JSTOR 1832884.
- Ordinances and Acts of the Restored Government of Virginia, with the Constitution and Laws of the State of West Virginia. Wheeling, West Virginia: John Frew. 1866.
- Thorpe, Francis Newton, ed. (1909a). The Federal and State Constitutions, Colonial Charters, and Other Organic Laws of the States, Territories, and Colonies Now or Heretofore Forming the United States of America. Vol. 1. Government Printing Office.
- Thorpe, Francis Newton, ed. (1909b). The Federal and State Constitutions, Colonial Charters, and Other Organic Laws of the States, Territories, and Colonies Now or Heretofore Forming the United States of America. Vol. 2. Government Printing Office.
- Thorpe, Francis Newton, ed. (1909c). The Federal and State Constitutions, Colonial Charters, and Other Organic Laws of the States, Territories, and Colonies Now or Heretofore Forming the United States of America. Vol. 3. Government Printing Office.
- Thorpe, Francis Newton, ed. (1909d). The Federal and State Constitutions, Colonial Charters, and Other Organic Laws of the States, Territories, and Colonies Now or Heretofore Forming the United States of America. Vol. 4. Government Printing Office.
- Thorpe, Francis Newton, ed. (1909e). The Federal and State Constitutions, Colonial Charters, and Other Organic Laws of the States, Territories, and Colonies Now or Heretofore Forming the United States of America. Vol. 5. Government Printing Office.
- Thorpe, Francis Newton, ed. (1909f). The Federal and State Constitutions, Colonial Charters, and Other Organic Laws of the States, Territories, and Colonies Now or Heretofore Forming the United States of America. Vol. 6. Government Printing Office.
- Thorpe, Francis Newton, ed. (1909g). The Federal and State Constitutions, Colonial Charters, and Other Organic Laws of the States, Territories, and Colonies Now or Heretofore Forming the United States of America. Vol. 7. Government Printing Office.
- Van Zandt, Franklin K. (1976). Boundaries of the United States and the Several States. Washington, D.C.: U.S. Government Printing Office. OCLC 69426475.
- Vermont (1823). Vermont State Papers.
- Walker, Francis A. (1874). Statistical Atlas of the United States. New York: J. Bien, lith. plate XV, Areas and Political Divisions of the United States 1776–1874.
- Williams, Samuel Cole (1924). History of the Lost State of Franklin.
- Wrighton, Scot W. (1983). "Appendix 4". The Pacific Guano Rush (MA thesis). University of Hawaii. pp. 241–243. hdl:10125/76145.
