= Territorial evolution of Idaho =

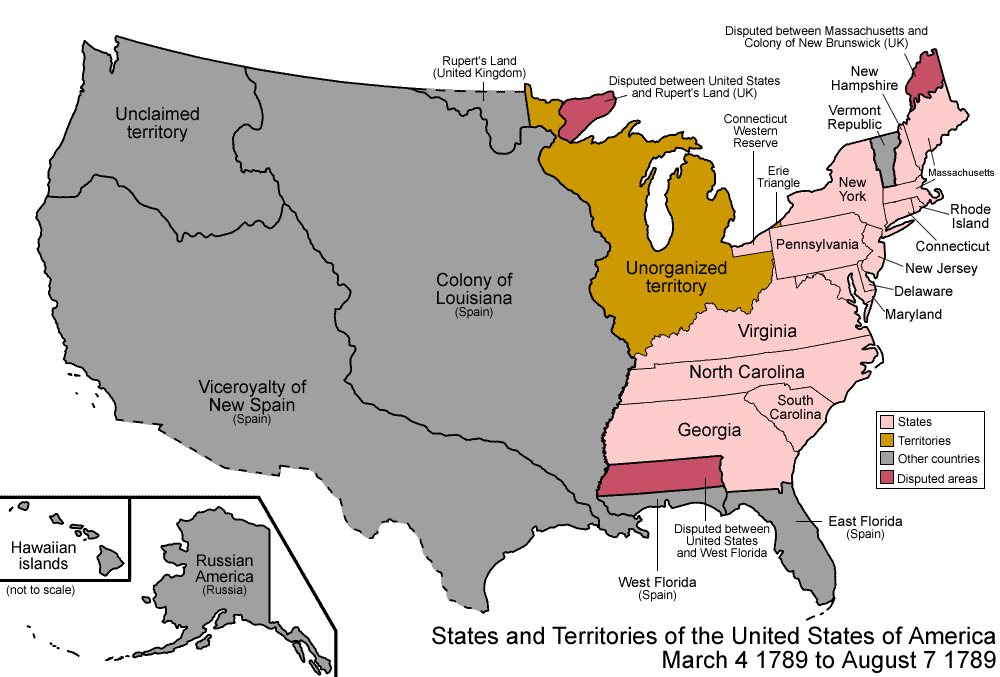
An enlargeable map of the United States after the Constitution of the United States was ratified on March 4, 1789.

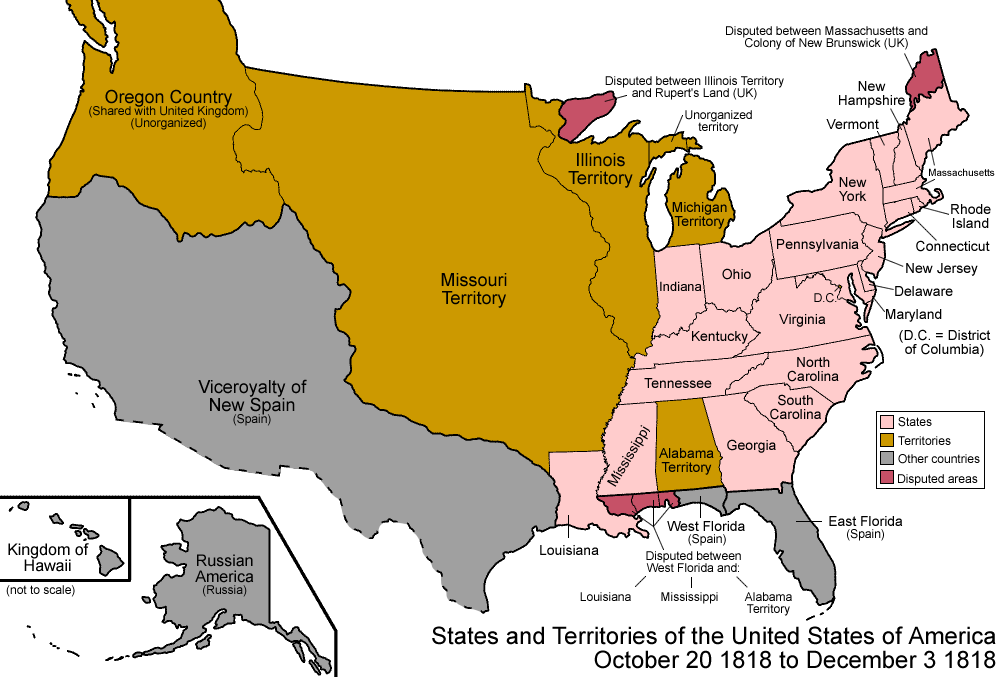
An enlargeable map of the United States after the Treaty of 1818 took effect on January 30, 1819.

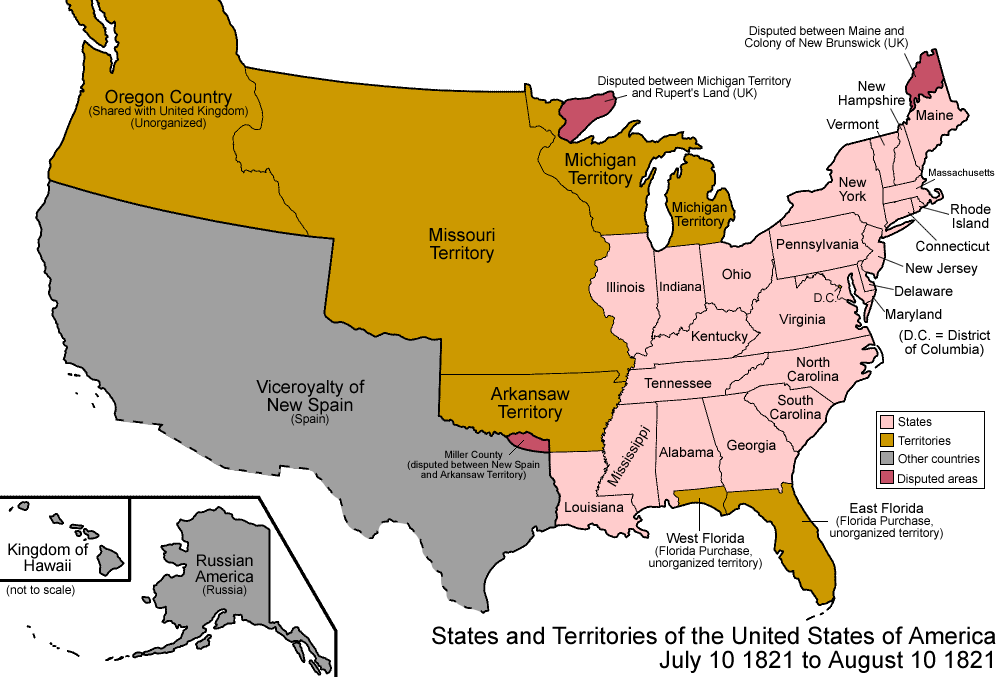
An enlargeable map of the United States after the Adams–Onís Treaty took effect on February 22, 1821.

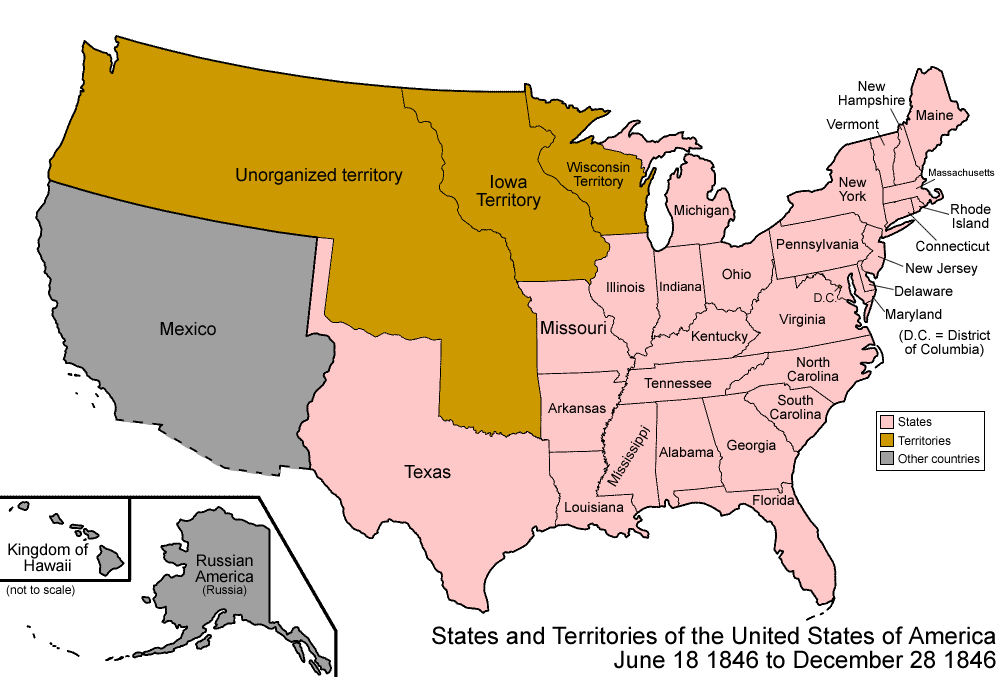
An enlargeable map of the United States after the Oregon Treaty took effect July 17, 1846

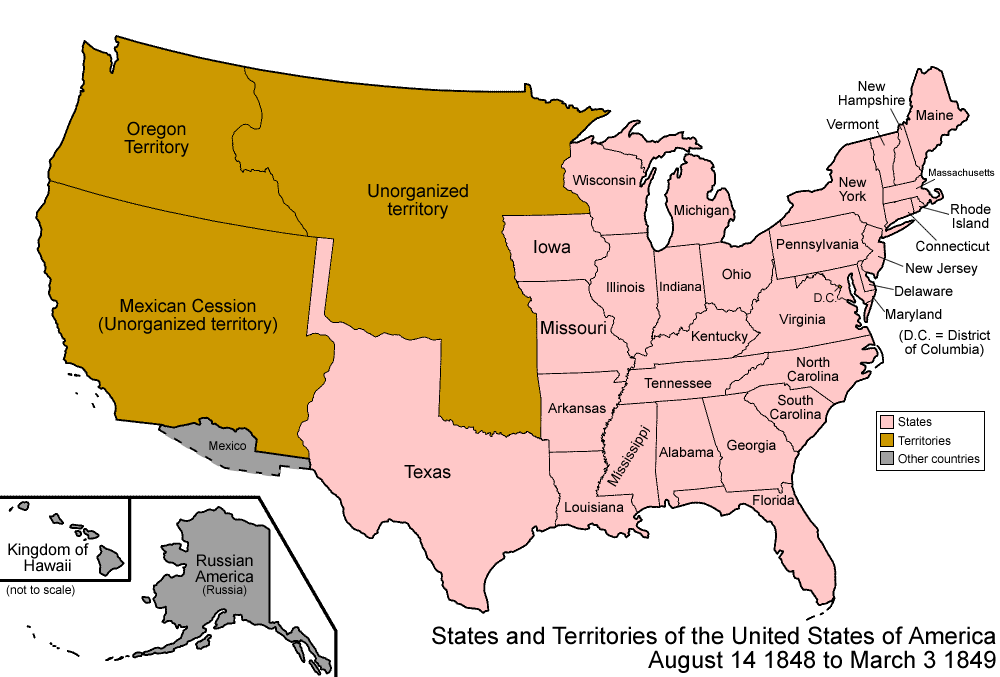
An enlargeable map of the United States after the creation of the Territory of Oregon on August 14, 1848.

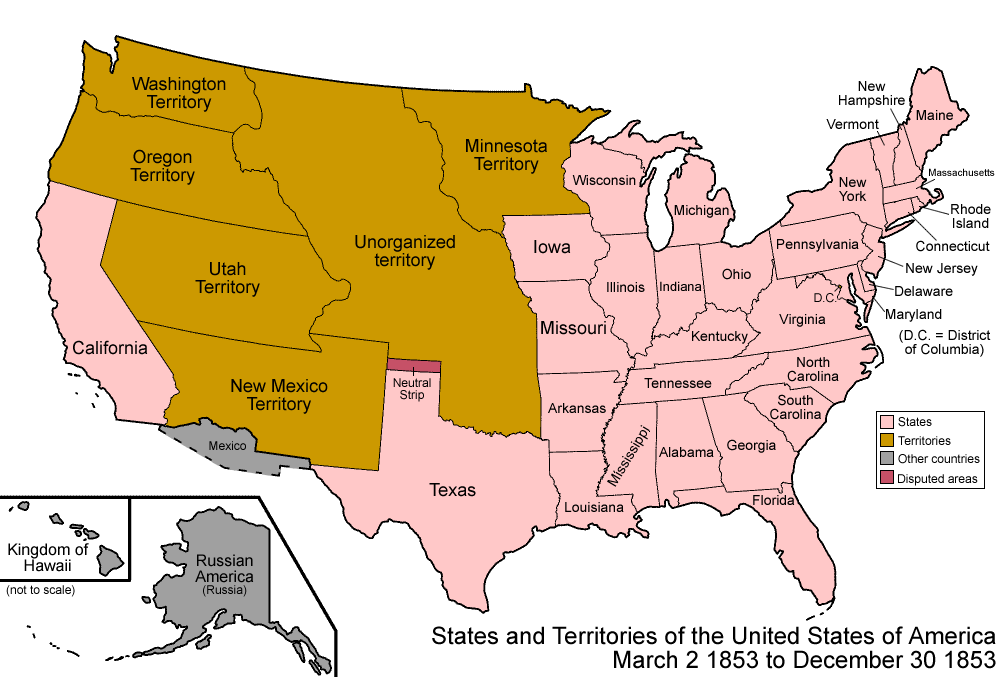
An enlargeable map of the United States after the creation of the Territory of Washington on March 2, 1853.

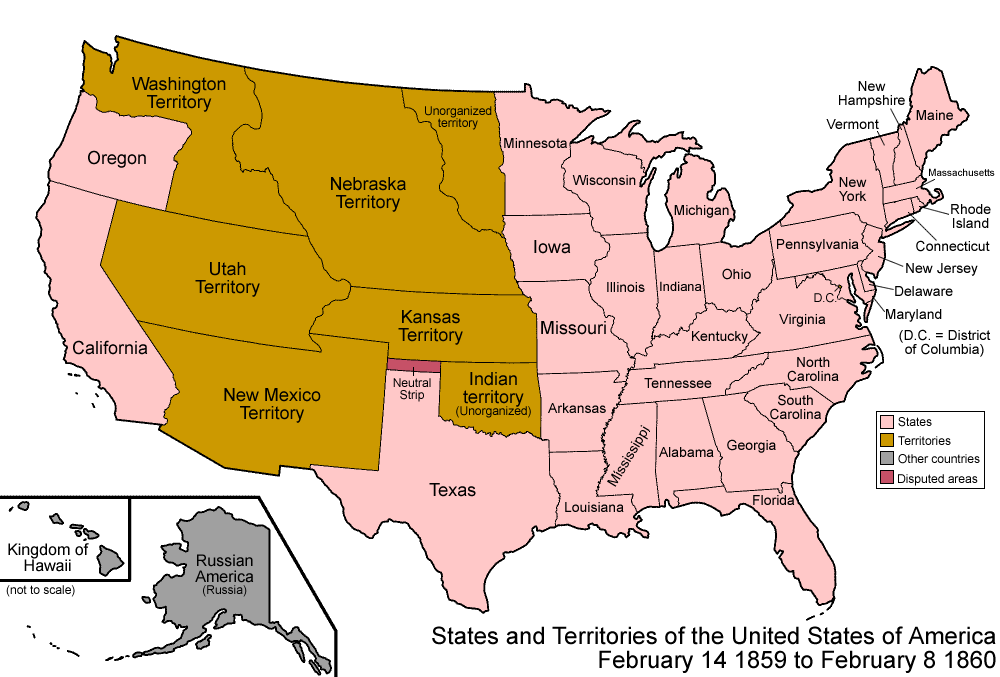
An enlargeable map of the United States after the admission of Oregon to the Union on February 14, 1859.

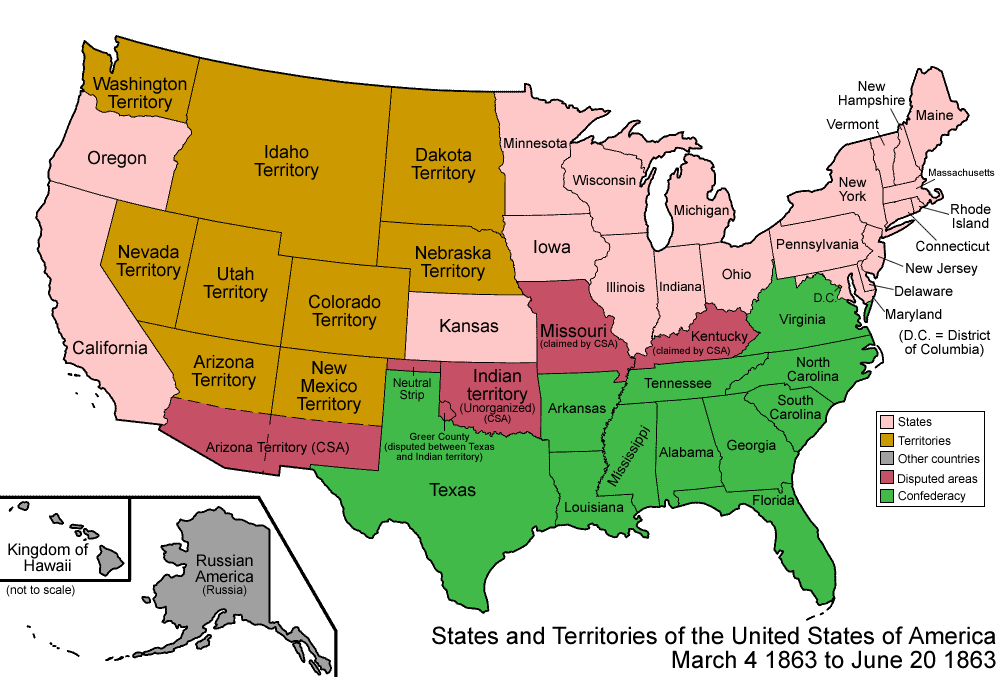
An enlargeable map of the United States after the creation of the Territory of Idaho on March 3, 1863.

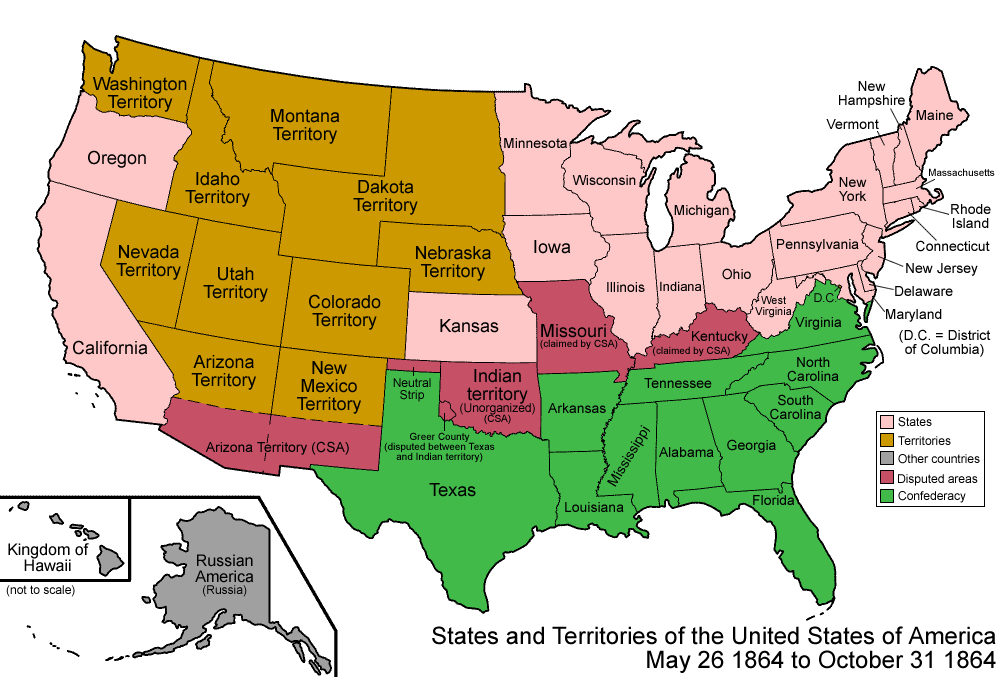
An enlargeable map of the United States after the creation of the Territory of Montana on May 26, 1864.

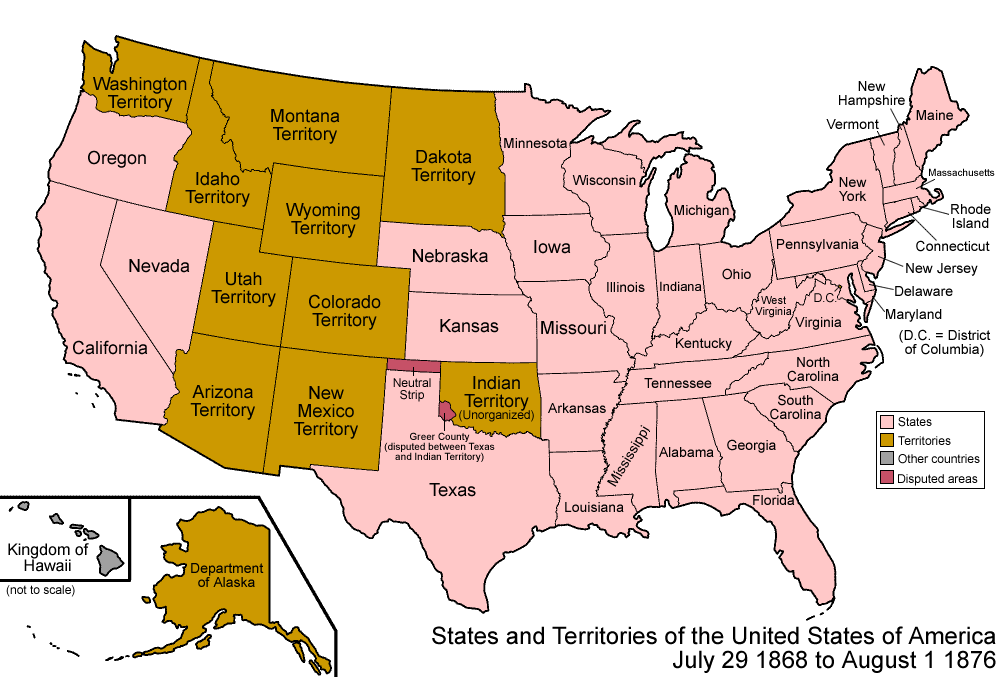
An enlargeable map of the United States after the creation of the Territory of Wyoming on July 25, 1868.

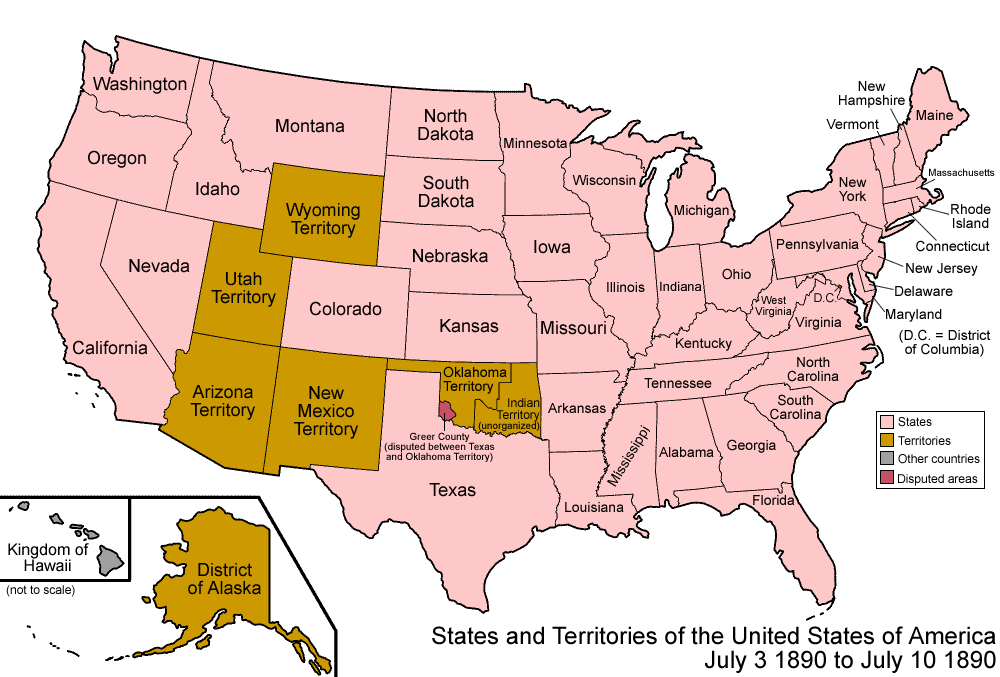
An enlargeable map of the United States after the admission of Idaho to the Union on July 3 1890.

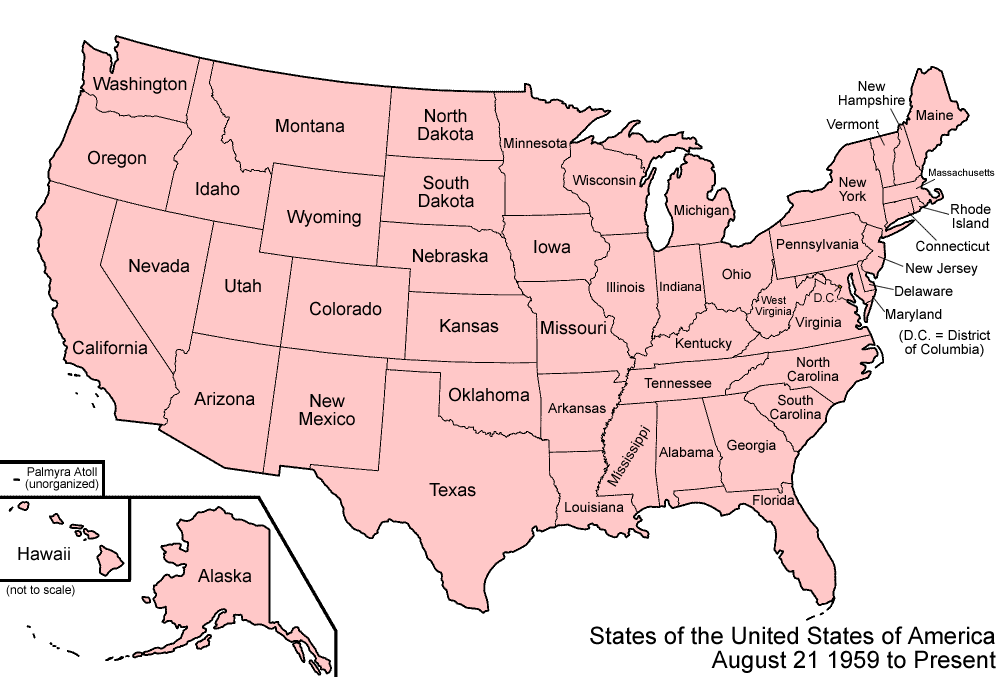
An enlargeable map of the United States as it has been since Hawaiʻi was admitted to the Union on August 21, 1959.

The following chronology traces the territorial evolution of the U.S. state of Idaho.

== Timeline ==
- Historical territorial claims of Spain in the present State of Idaho:
  - Gran Cuenca, 1776–1821
  - Adams-Onis Treaty of 1819
- Historical international territory in the present State of Idaho:
  - Oregon Country, 1818–1846
    - Anglo-American Convention of 1818
    - Provisional Government of Oregon (extralegal), 1843–1849
    - Oregon Treaty of 1846
- Historical political divisions of the United States in the present State of Idaho:
  - Unorganized territory created by the Oregon Treaty, 1846–1848
  - Territory of Oregon, 1848–1859
  - State of Deseret (extralegal), 1849–1850
  - Territory of Washington, 1853–1889
  - Territory of Idaho, 1863-1890
  - State of Idaho since 1890

== See also ==
- Historical outline of Idaho
- History of Idaho
- Territorial evolution of the United States

Territorial evolution of Montana
Territorial evolution of Nevada
Territorial evolution of Oregon
Territorial evolution of Utah
(Washington (state)) Territorial evolution of Washington
Territorial evolution of Wyoming
