= Territorial evolution of Arizona =

Territorial evolution of the U.S State of Arizona

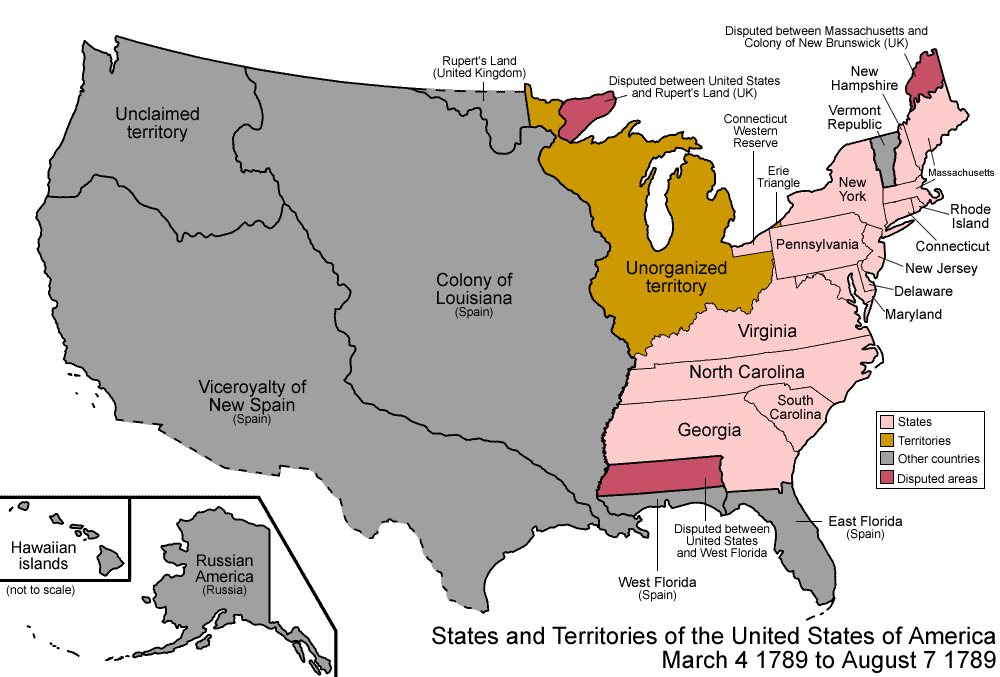
An enlargeable map of the United States after the Constitution of the United States came into force on March 4, 1789.

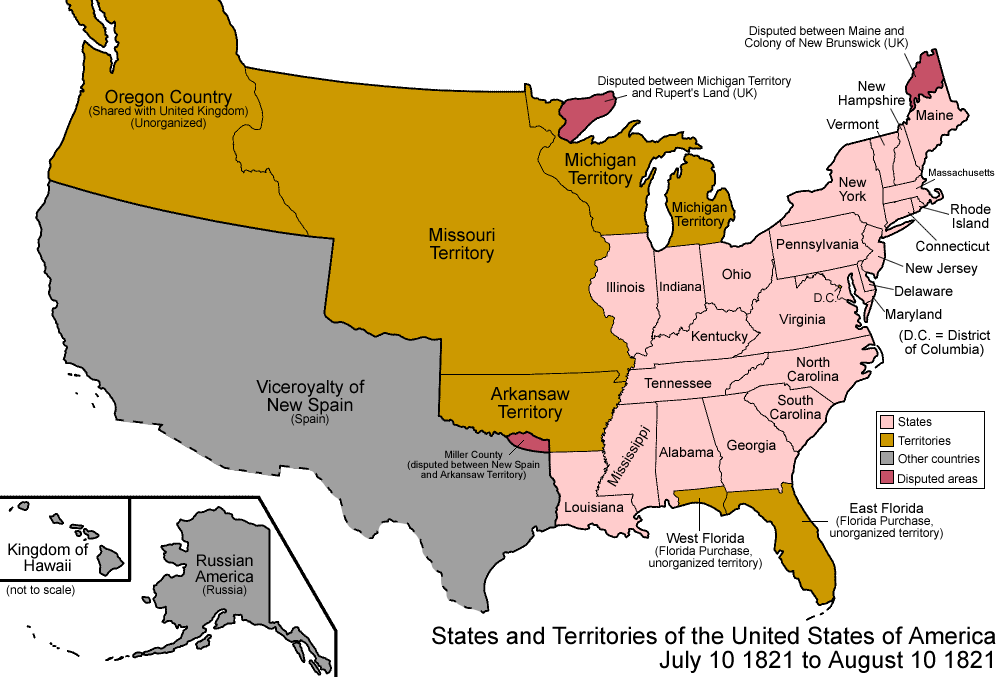
An enlargeable map of the United States after the Treaty of Córdoba was signed on August 24, 1821.

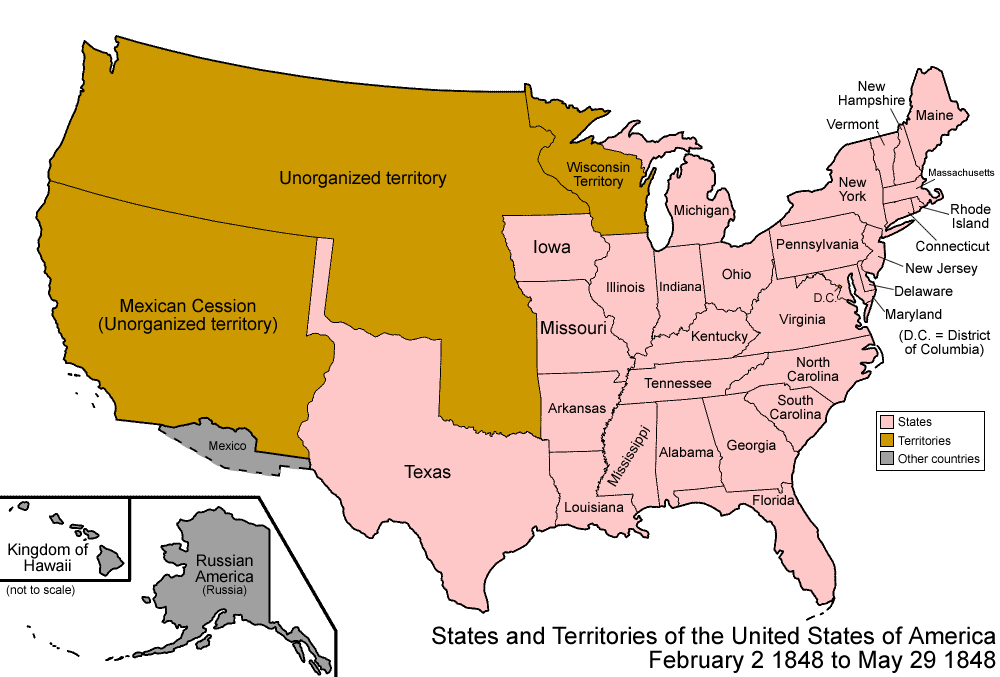
An enlargeable map of the United States after the Treaty of Guadalupe Hidalgo was signed on February 2, 1848.

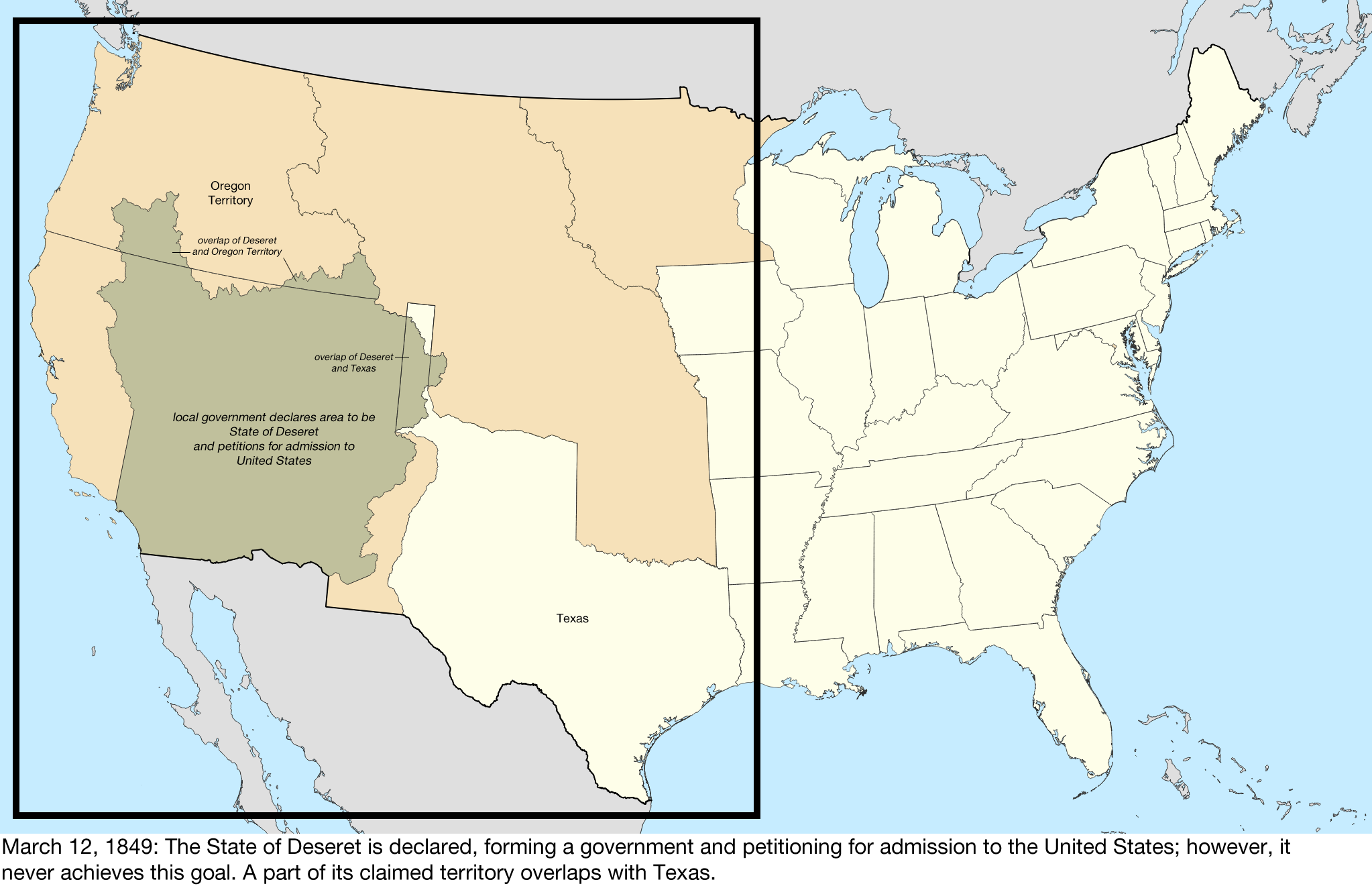
An enlargeable map of the United States after the creation of the proposed State of Deseret on July 2, 1849.

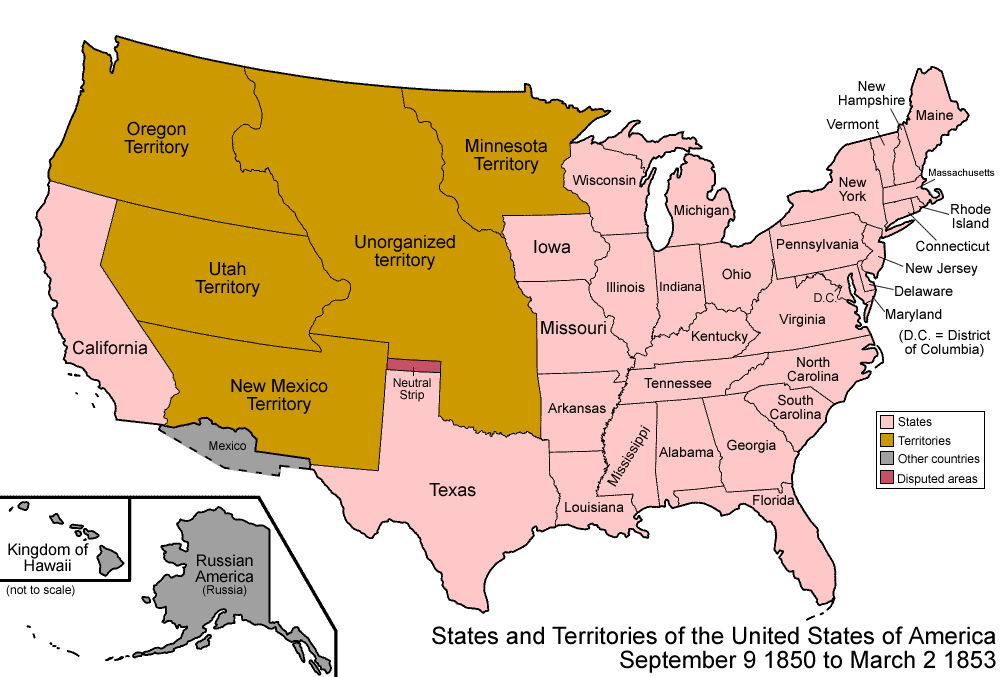
An enlargeable map of the United States after the creation of the Territory of New Mexico and the Territory of Utah on September 9, 1850.

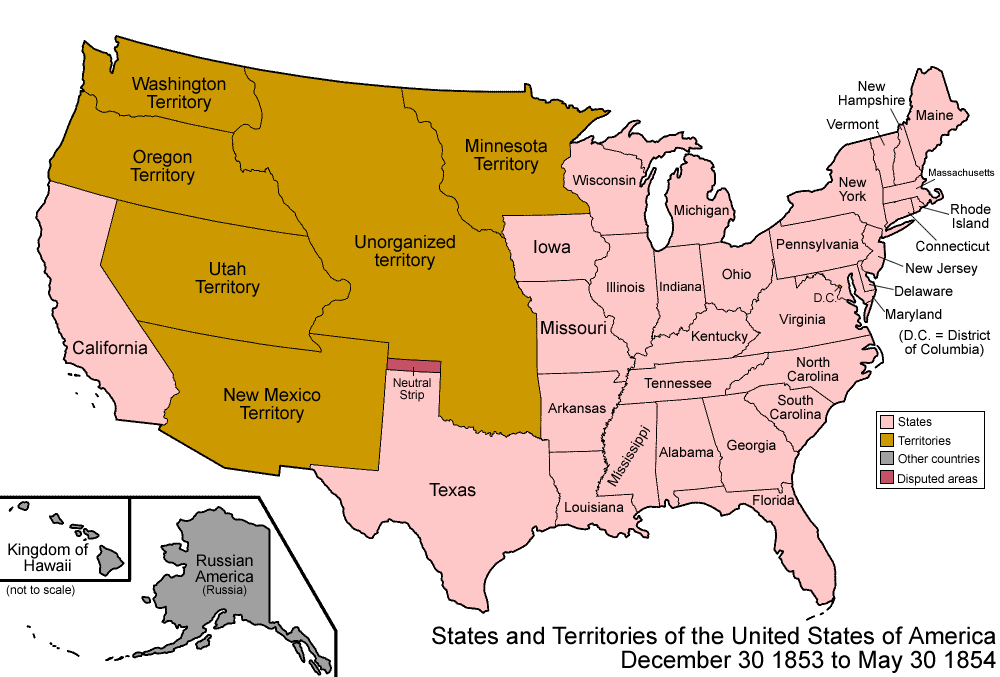
An enlargeable map of the United States after Gadsden Purchase on December 30, 1853.

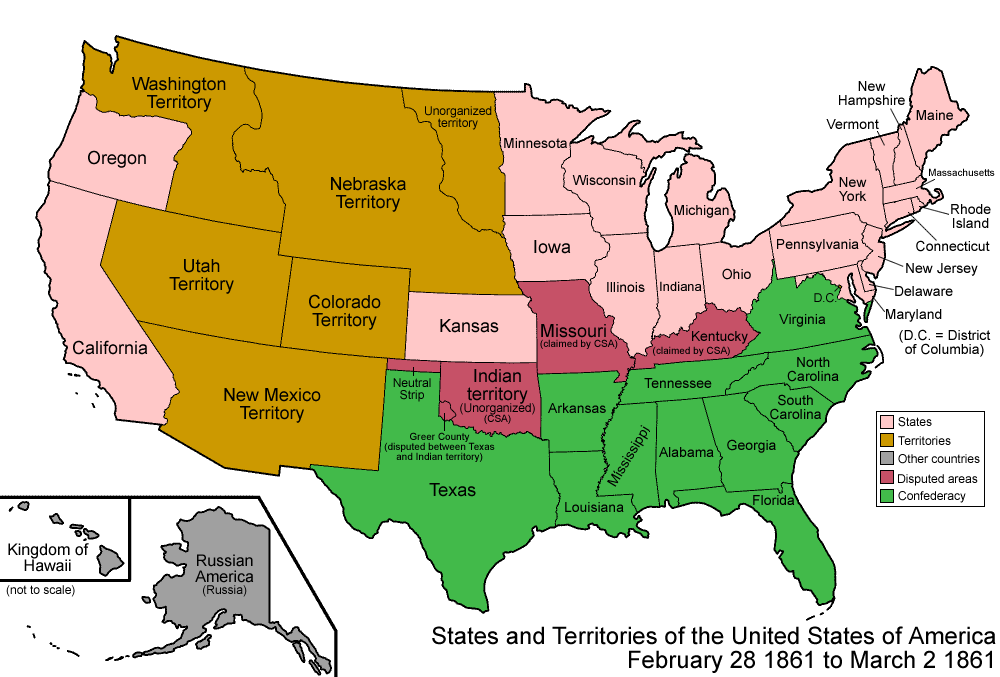
An enlargeable map of the United States after the creation of the Territory of Colorado on February 28, 1861.

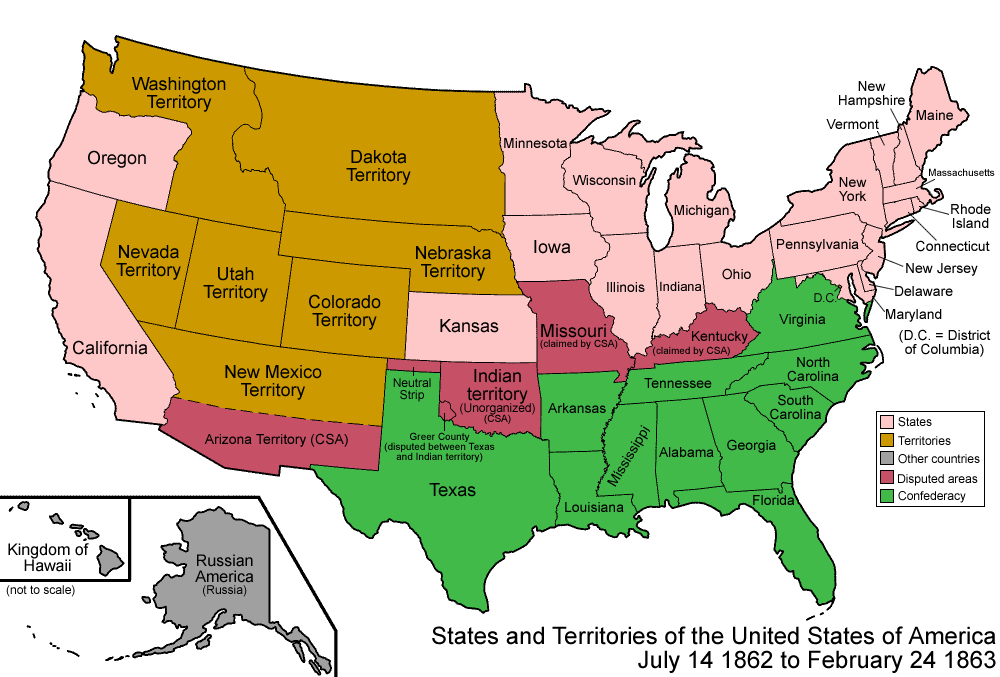
An enlargeable map of the United States after the creation of the Confederate Territory of Arizona on February 24, 1862.

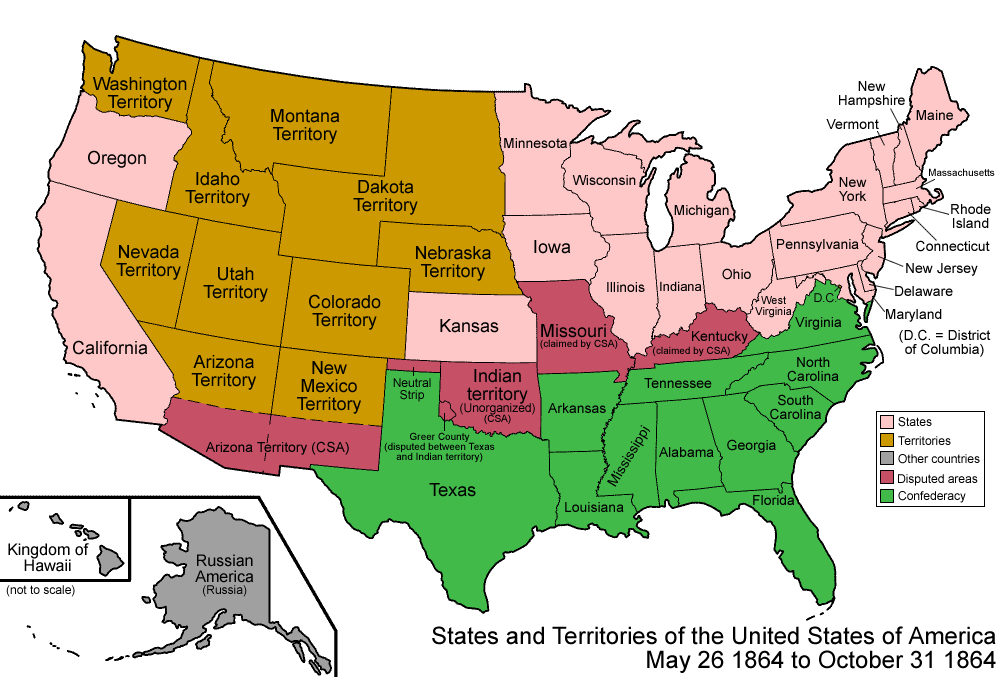
An enlargeable map of the United States after the creation of the Territory of Arizona on June 19, 1862.

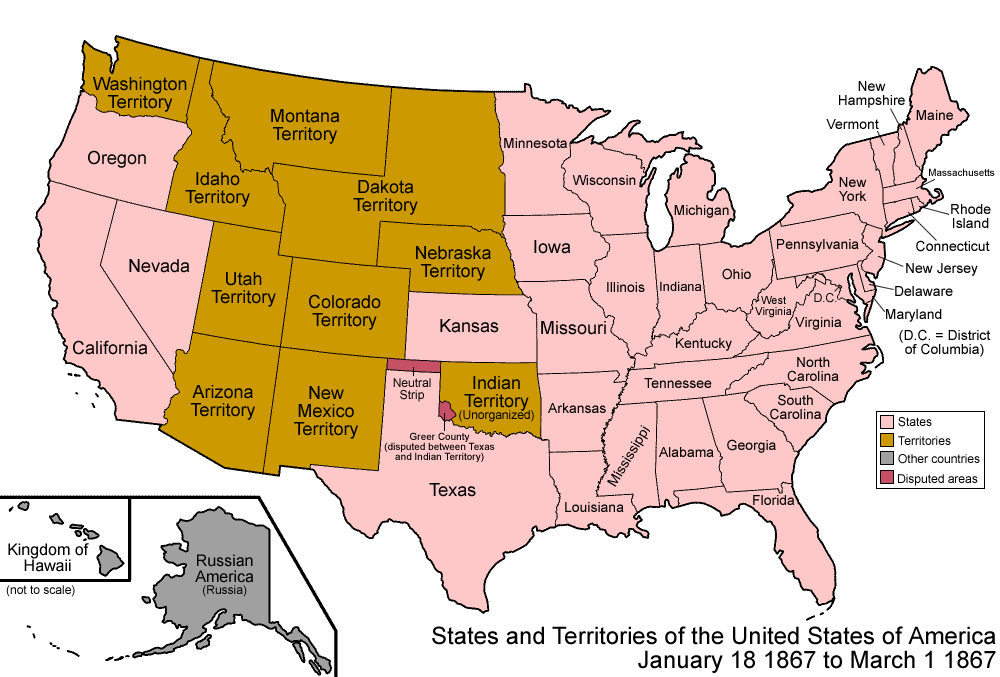
An enlargeable map of the United States after the annexation of northwestern Arizona on January 18, 1867.

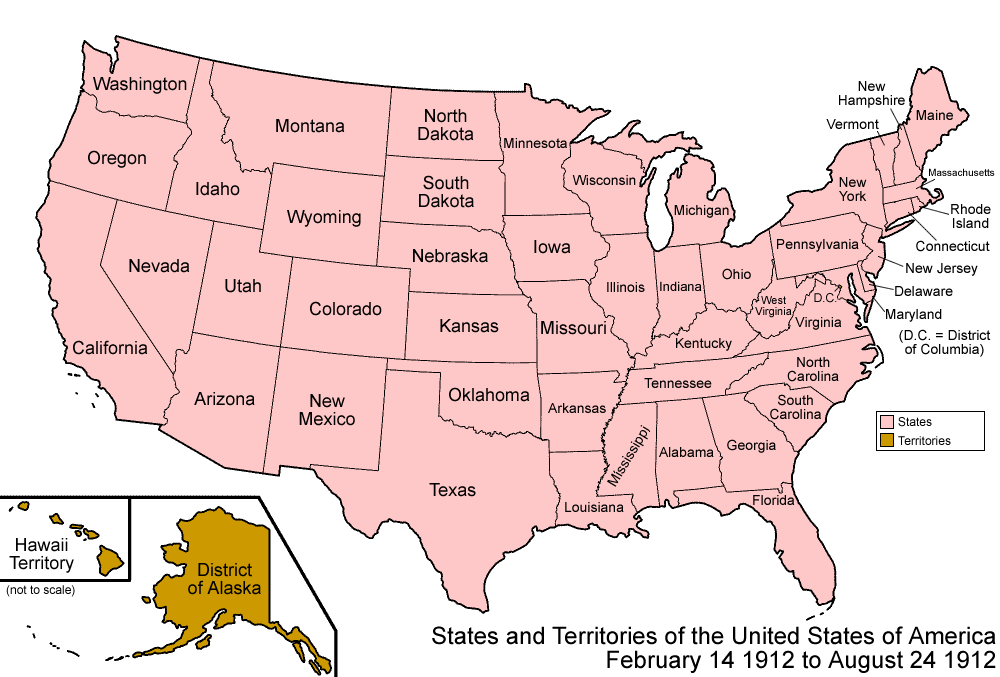
An enlargeable map of the United States after the admission of Arizona to the Union on February 14, 1912.

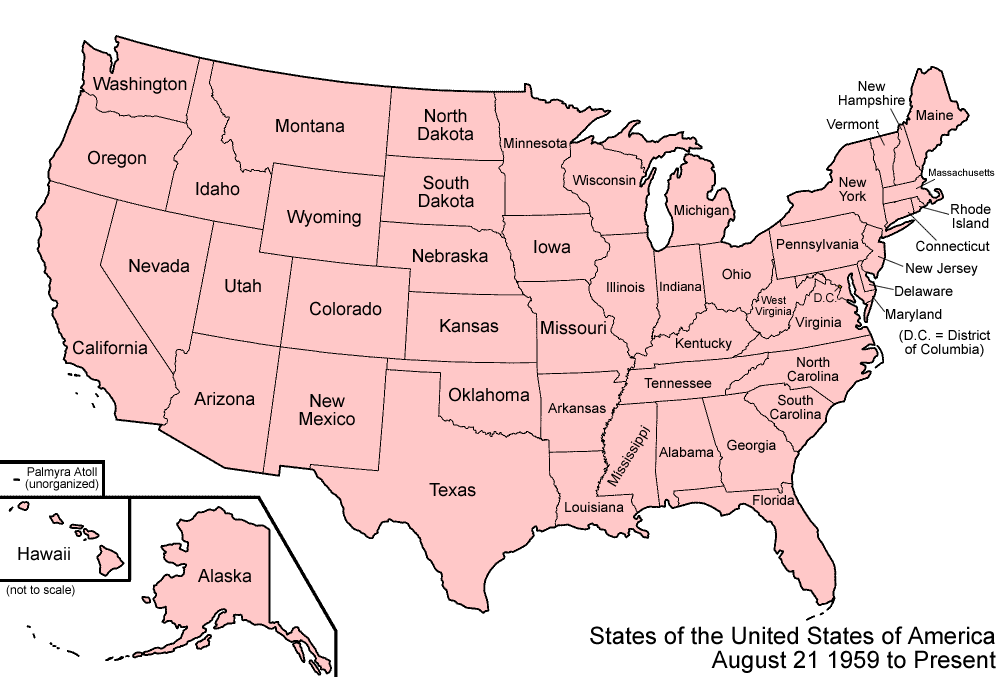
An enlargeable map of the United States as it has been since Hawaiiʻi was admitted to the Union on August 21, 1959.

The following timeline traces the territorial evolution of the U.S. State of Arizona.

== Timeline ==
- Historical territorial claims of Spain in the present State of Arizona:
  - Nueva Vizcaya, 1562–1821
  - Santa Fé de Nuevo Méjico, 1598–1821
  - Sonora y Sinaloa, 1732–1821
    - Treaty of Córdoba of 1821
- Historical territorial claims of Mexico in the present State of Arizona:
  - Santa Fé de Nuevo México, 1821–1848
  - Sonora y Sinaloa (Estado de Occidente), 1824–1830
  - Sonora since 1830
    - Treaty of Guadalupe Hidalgo of 1848
    - Gadsden Purchase of 1853
- Historical political divisions of the United States in the present State of Arizona:
  - Unorganized territory created by the Treaty of Guadalupe Hidalgo, 1848–1850
    - Compromise of 1850
  - State of Deseret (extralegal), 1849–1850
  - Territory of New Mexico, 1850–1912
    - Gadsden Purchase of 1853
  - American Civil War, 1861–1865
    - Arizona Territory (CSA), 1861–1865
  - Territory of Arizona, 1863–1912
    - North-western corner of the Arizona Territory is transferred to the State of Nevada, 1867
  - State of Arizona since February 14, 1912
  - Mexican Boundary Exchanges: In 1927 under the Banco Convention of 1905, the U.S. acquired two bancos from Mexico at the Colorado River border with Arizona. Farmers Banco, covering 583.4 acres (2.361 km^{2}), a part of the Cocopah Indian Reservation at 32°37′27″N 114°46′45″W, was ceded to the U.S. with controversy. Fain Banco (259 acres (1.05 km^{2})) at 32°31′32″N 114°47′28″W also became U.S. soil.

== See also ==
- History of Arizona
- Territorial evolution of the United States

Territorial evolution of California
List of territorial claims and designations in Colorado
Territorial evolution of Nevada
Territorial evolution of New Mexico
Territorial evolution of Utah
