= Outline of Washington territorial evolution =

Overview of and topical guide to Washington territorial evolution

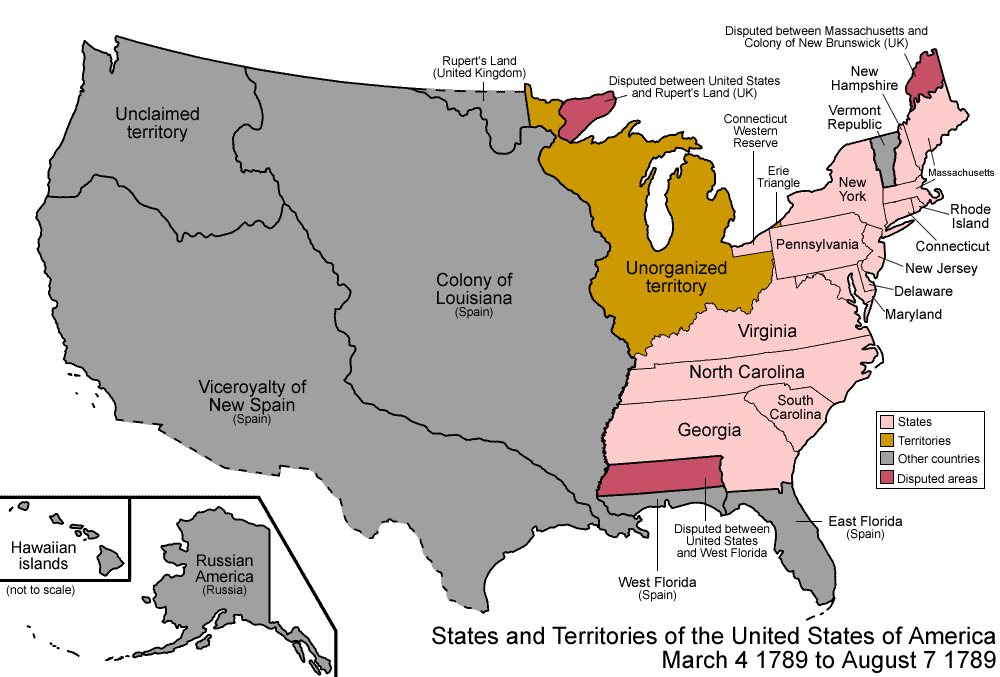
An enlargeable map of the United States after the Treaty of Paris in 1789

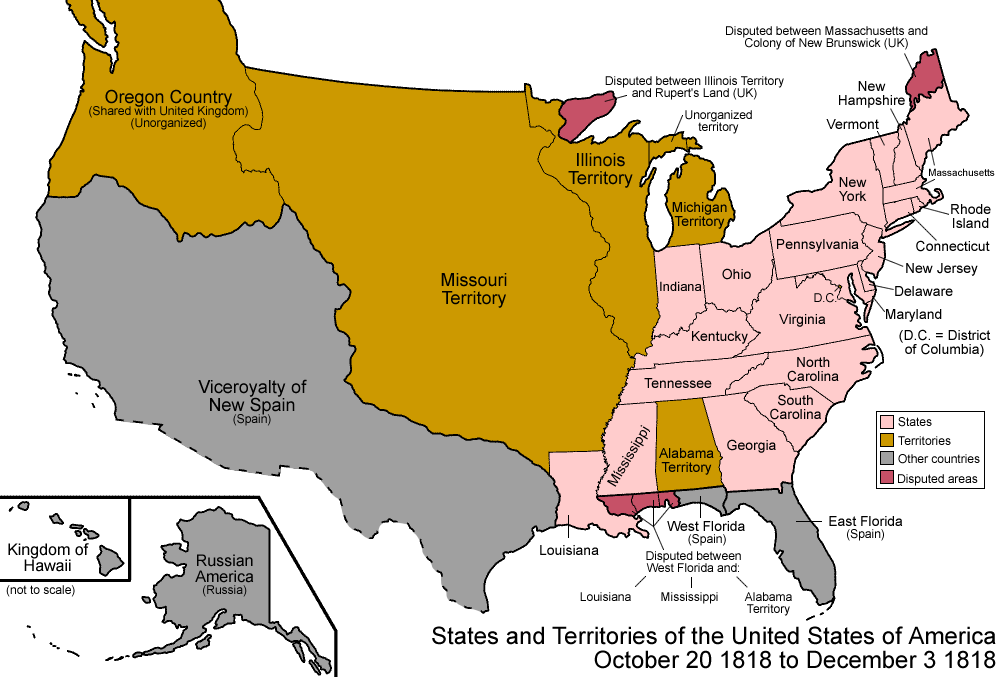
An enlargeable map of the United States after the Anglo-American Convention of 1818

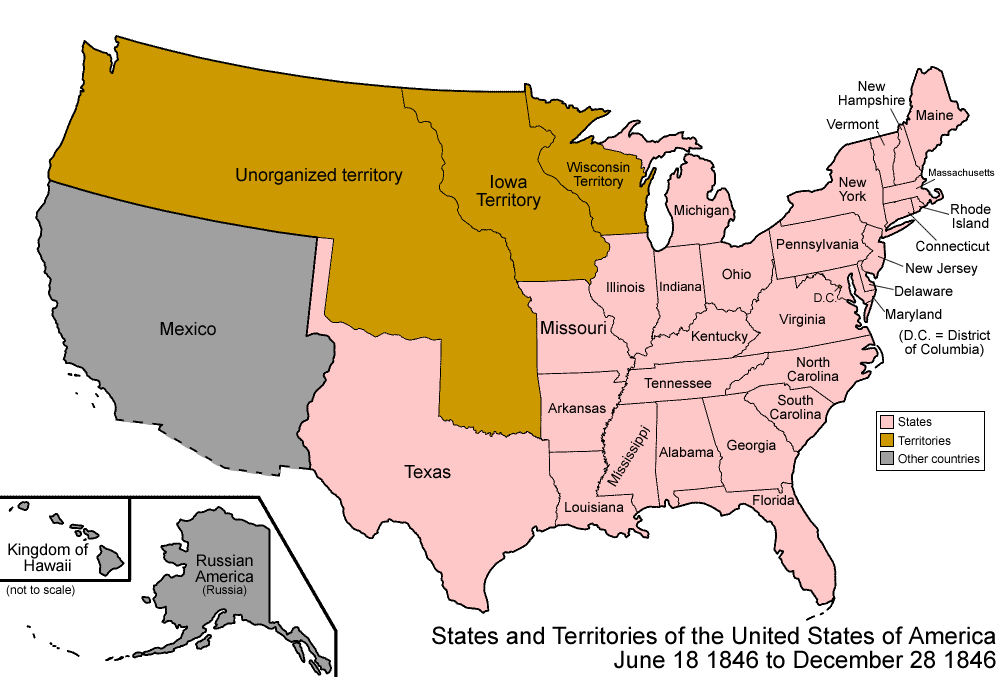
An enlargeable map of the United States after the Oregon Treaty of 1846

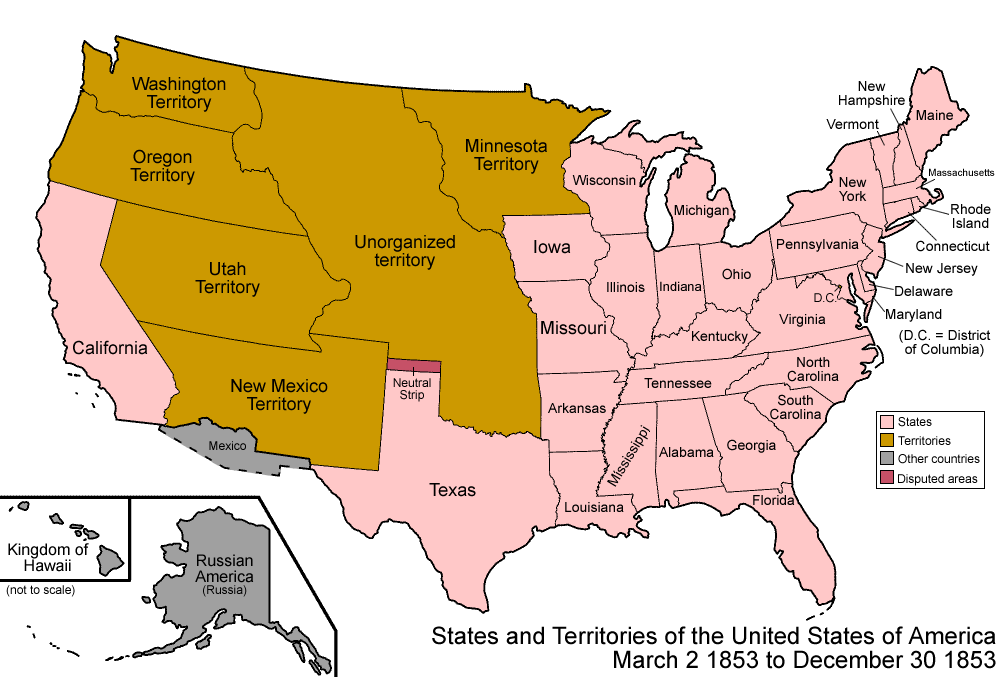
An enlargeable map of the United States after the Washington Organic Act in 1853

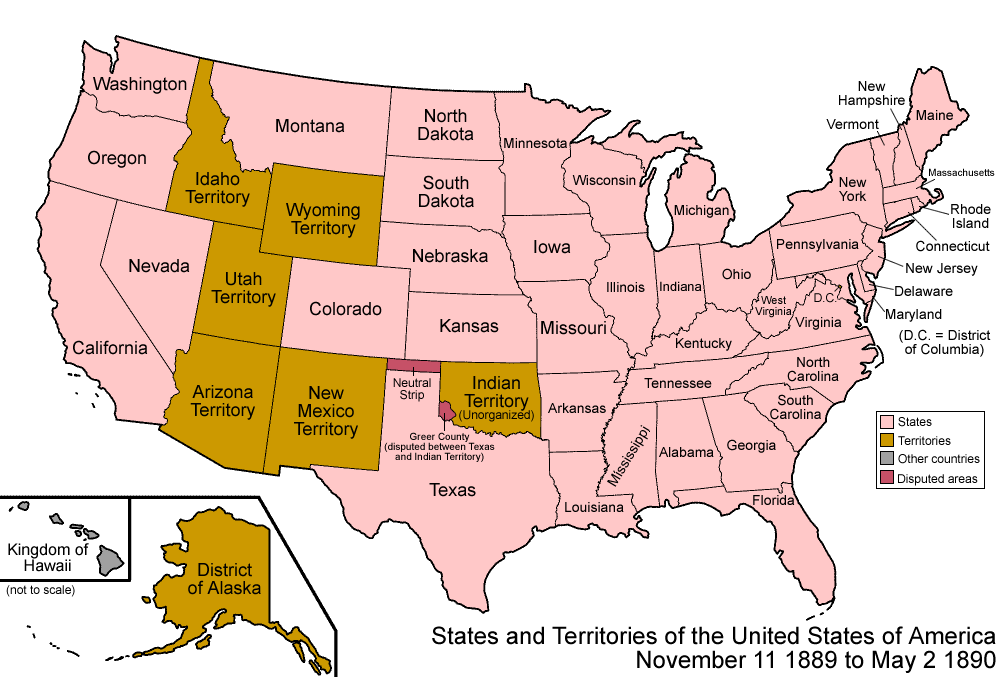
An enlargeable map of the United States after Washington Statehood in 1889

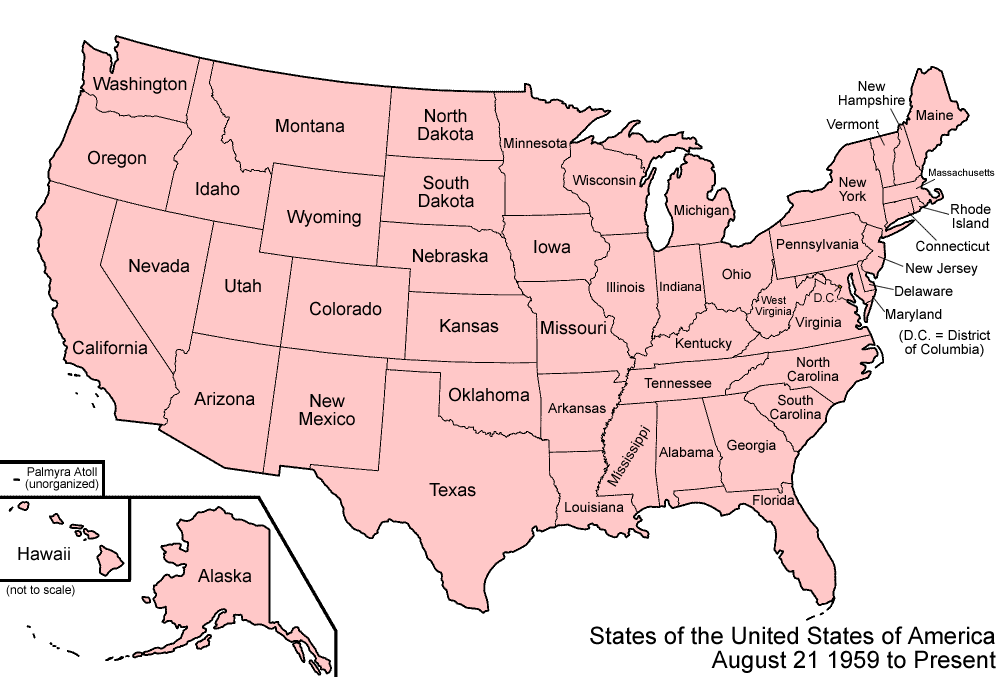
An enlargeable map of the United States as it has been since 1959

The following outline traces the territorial evolution of the U.S. State of Washington.

== Outline ==
- Historical international territory in the present State of Washington:
  - Oregon Country, 1818-1846
    - Anglo-American Convention of 1818
    - Provisional Government of Oregon (extralegal), 1843-1849
    - Oregon Treaty of 1846
- Historical political divisions of the United States in the present State of Washington:
  - Unorganized territory created by the Oregon Treaty, 1846-1848
  - Territory of Oregon, 1848-1859
  - Territory of Washington, 1853-1889
  - State of Washington since 1889

== See also ==
- Historical outline of Washington
- History of Washington (state)
- Territorial evolution of the United States

Territorial evolution of Idaho
Territorial evolution of Oregon
