= Territorial evolution of California =

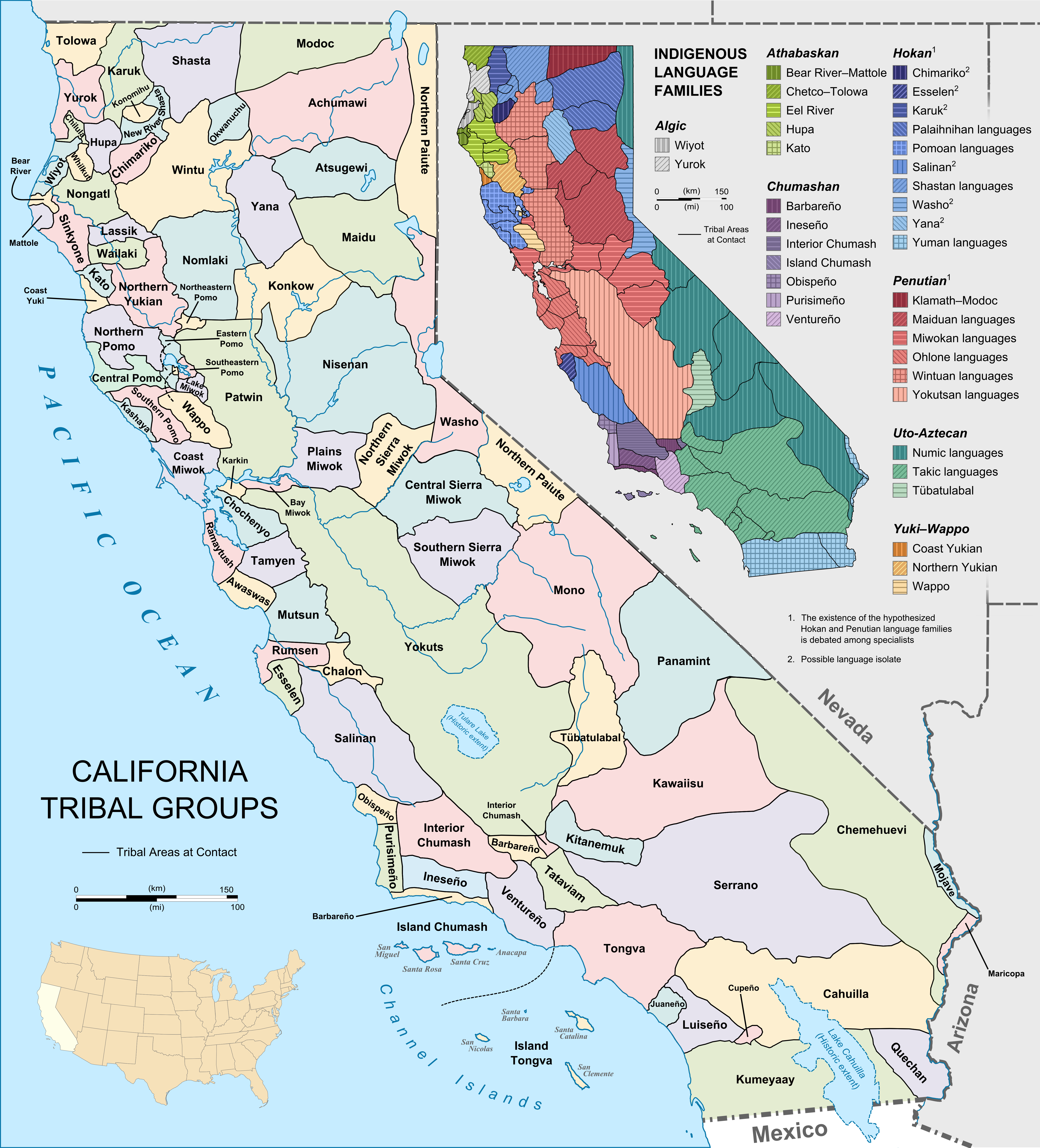
Before 1768: An enlargeable territorial map of California tribal groups and languages prior to European contact within the modern day borders.

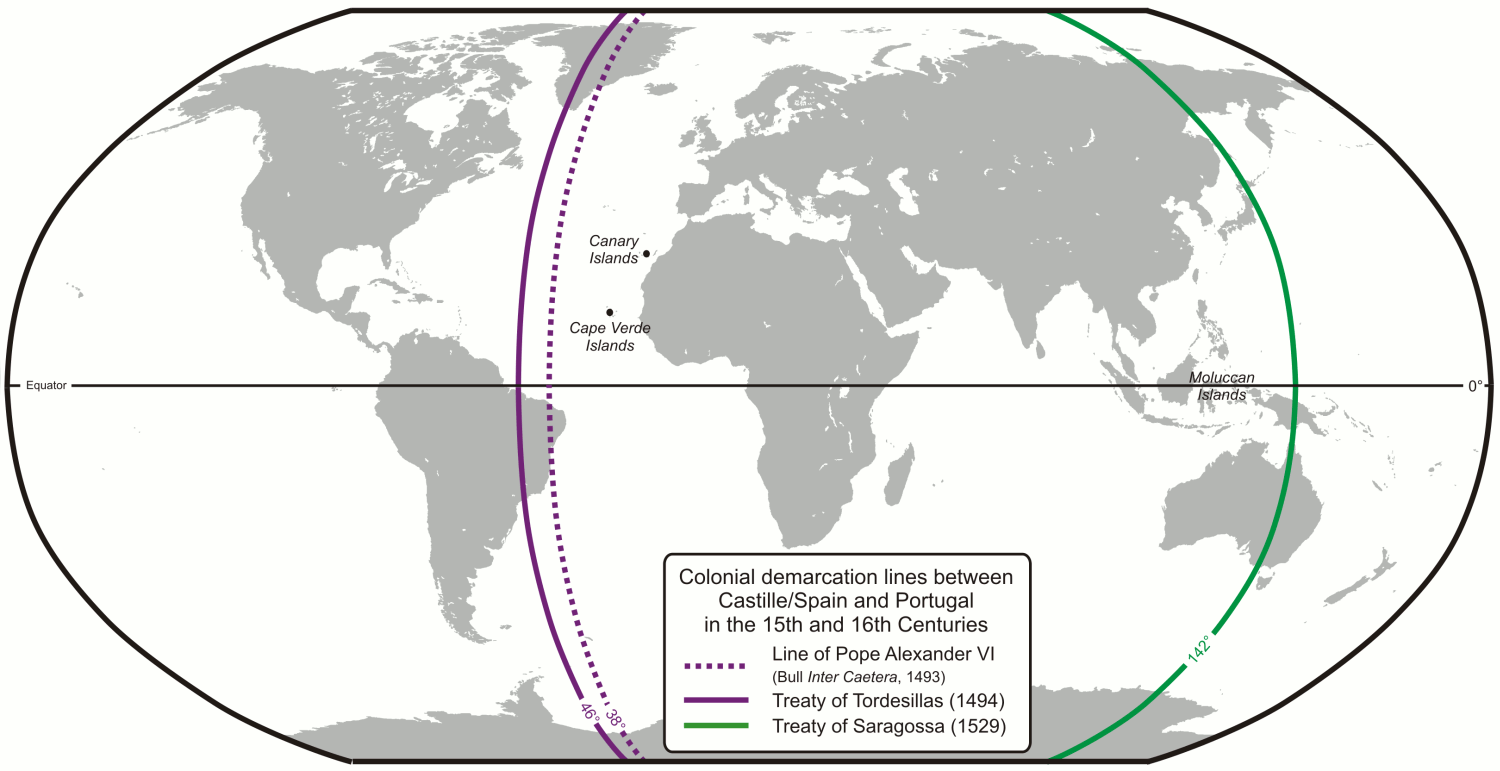
Before 1768: An enlargeable map of the world showing the dividing lines for; Pope Alexander VI's Inter caetera papal bull (1493), the Treaty of Tordesillas (1494), and the Treaty of Saragossa (1529).

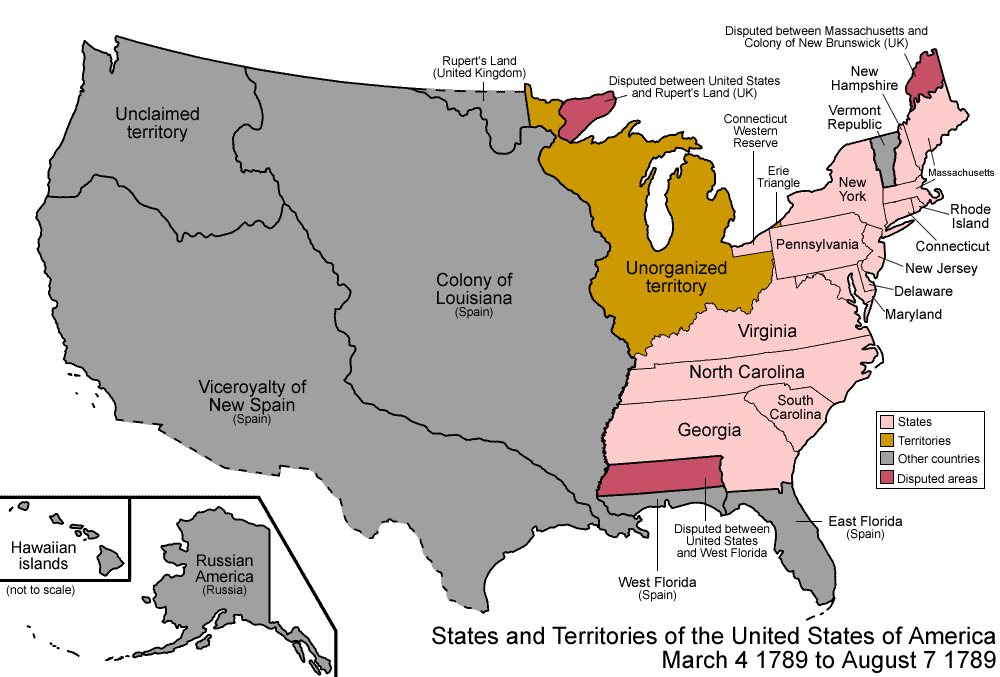
Spanish period: An enlargeable map of the United States after the Treaty of Paris in 1783.

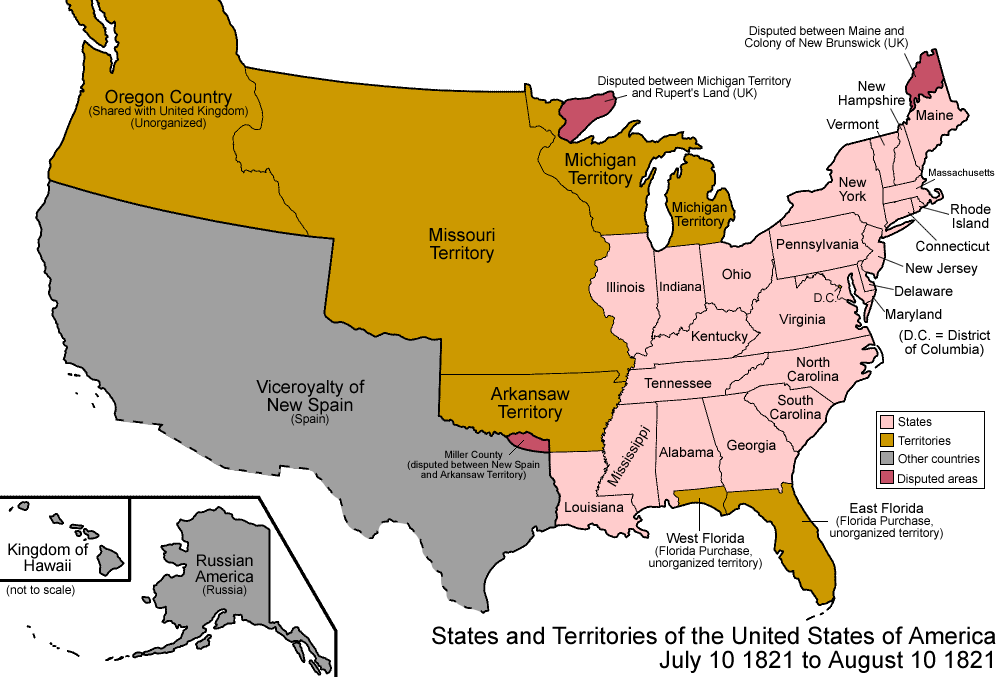
Spanish period: An enlargeable map of the United States after the Adams–Onís Treaty took effect in 1821.

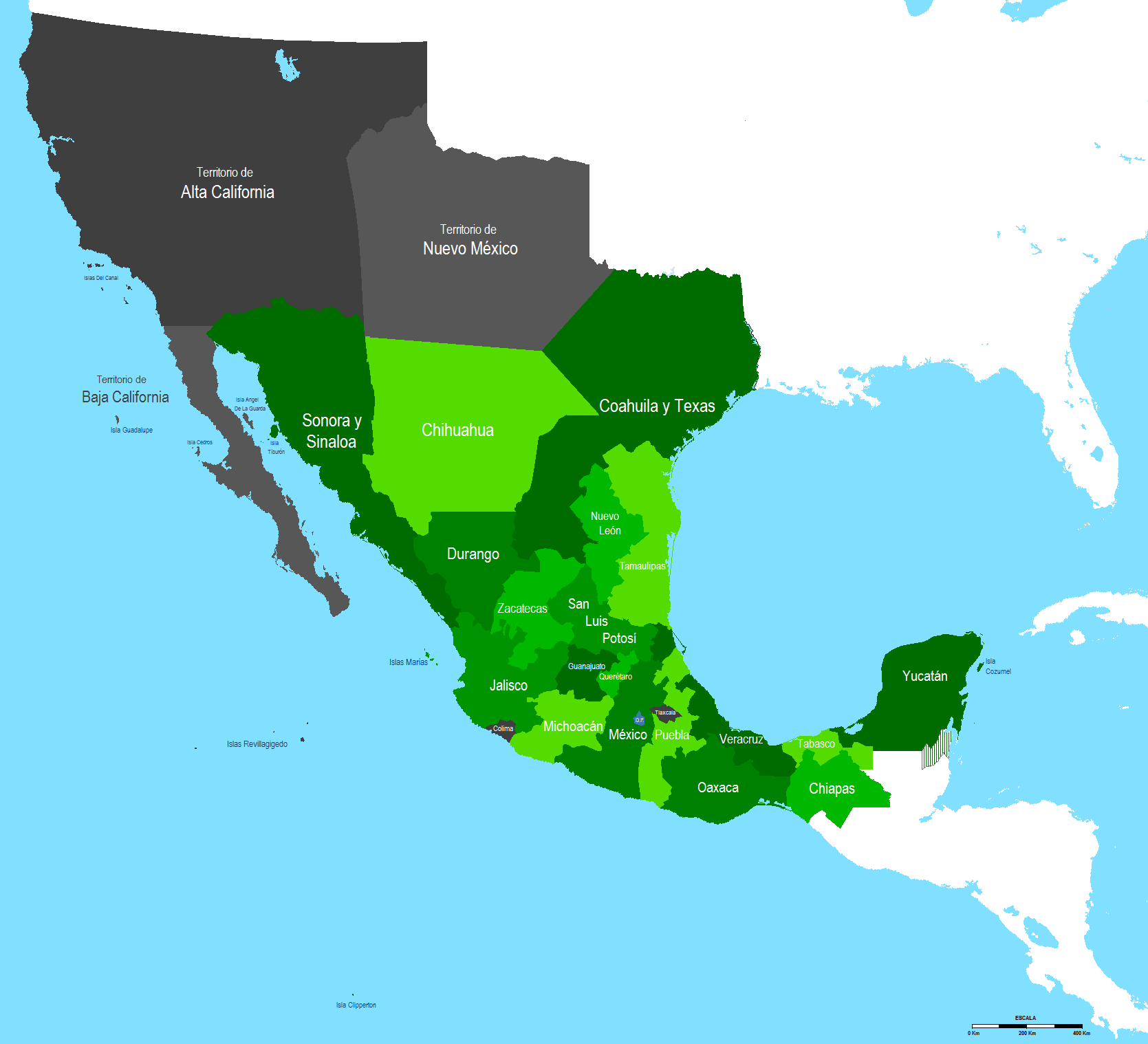
Mexican period: An enlargeable map showing Alta California Territory (black) after the 1824 Constitution of Mexico.

Mexican period: Political divisions of Mexico as altered by Las Siete Leyes.

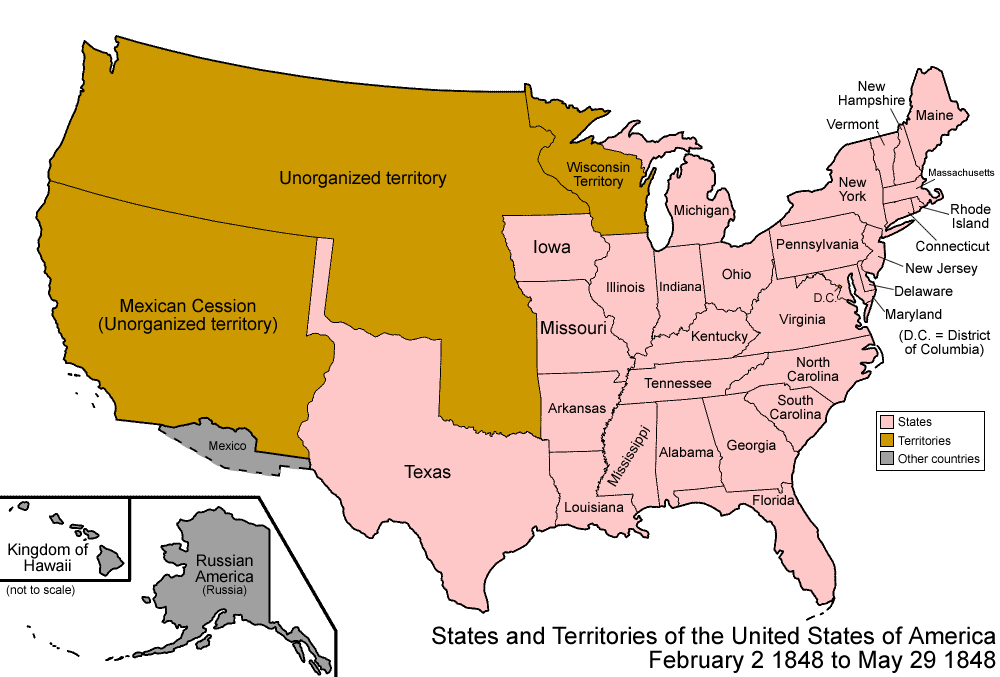
American period: An enlargeable map of the United States after the Treaty of Guadalupe Hidalgo in 1848.

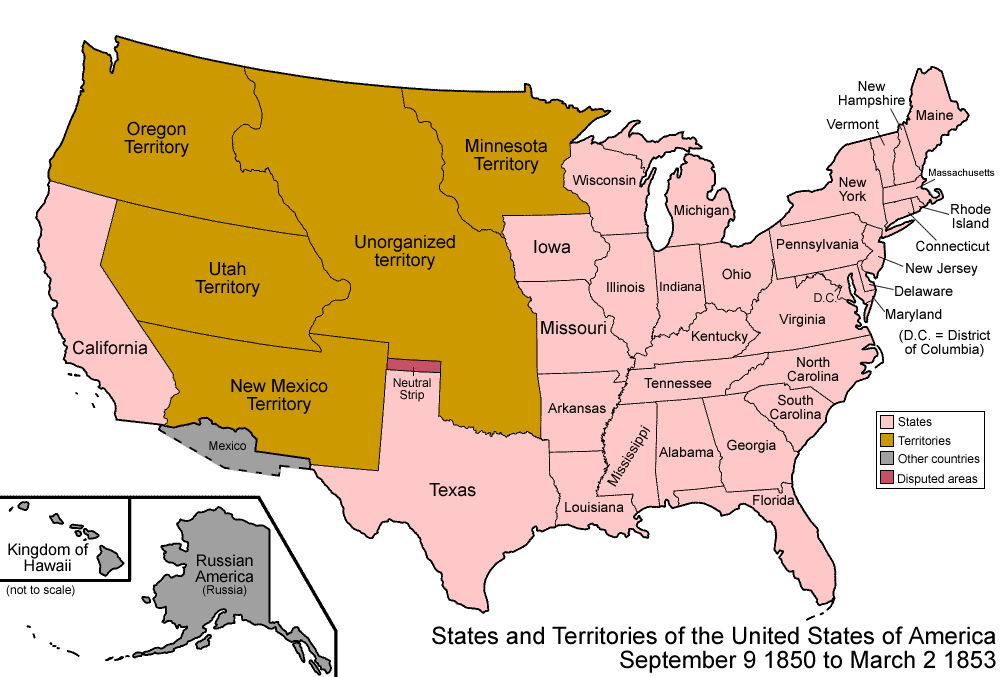
American period: An enlargeable map of the United States after the Compromise of 1850.

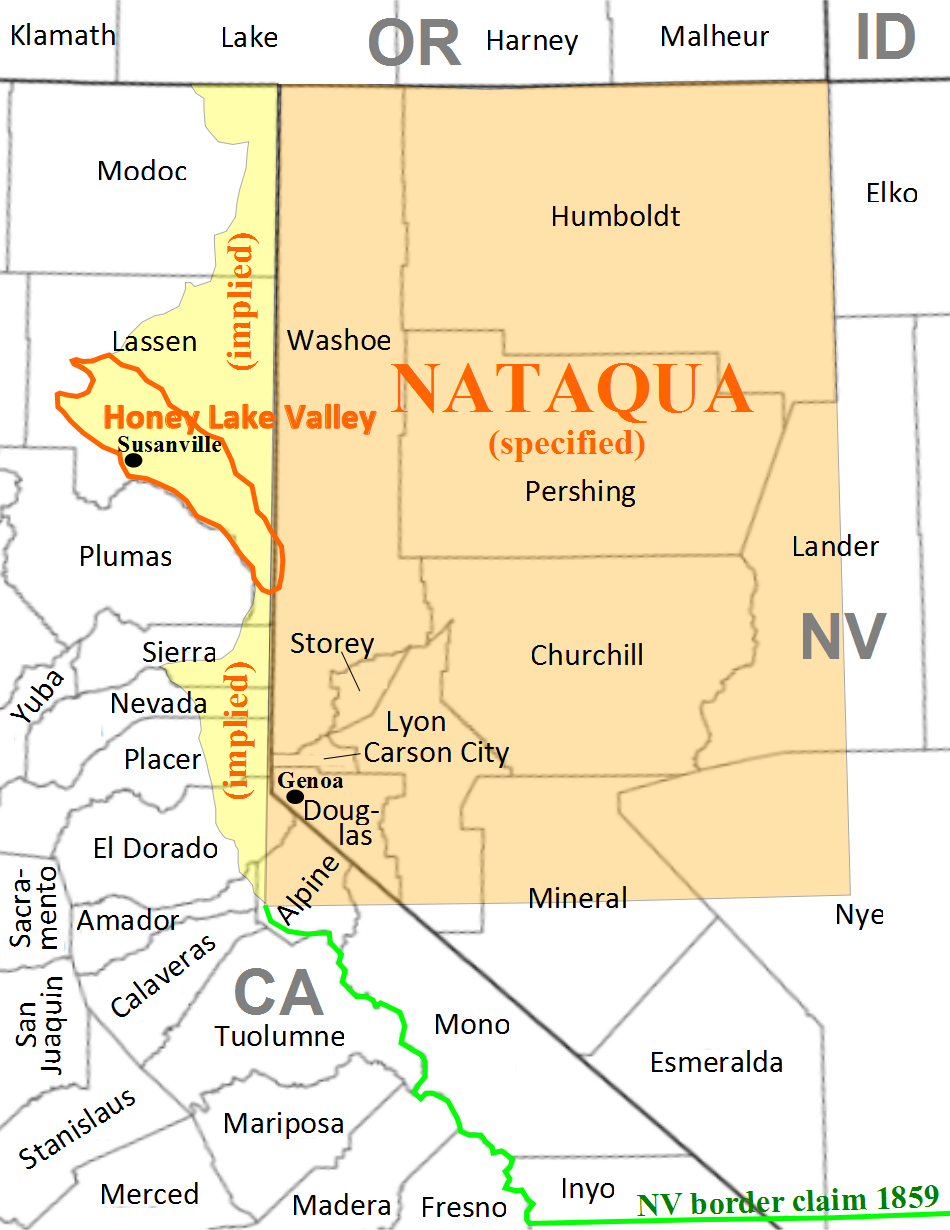
American period: The Nataqua Territory extension into California (light yellow), and Nevada's Roop County claim (light yellow area plus area outlined in green).

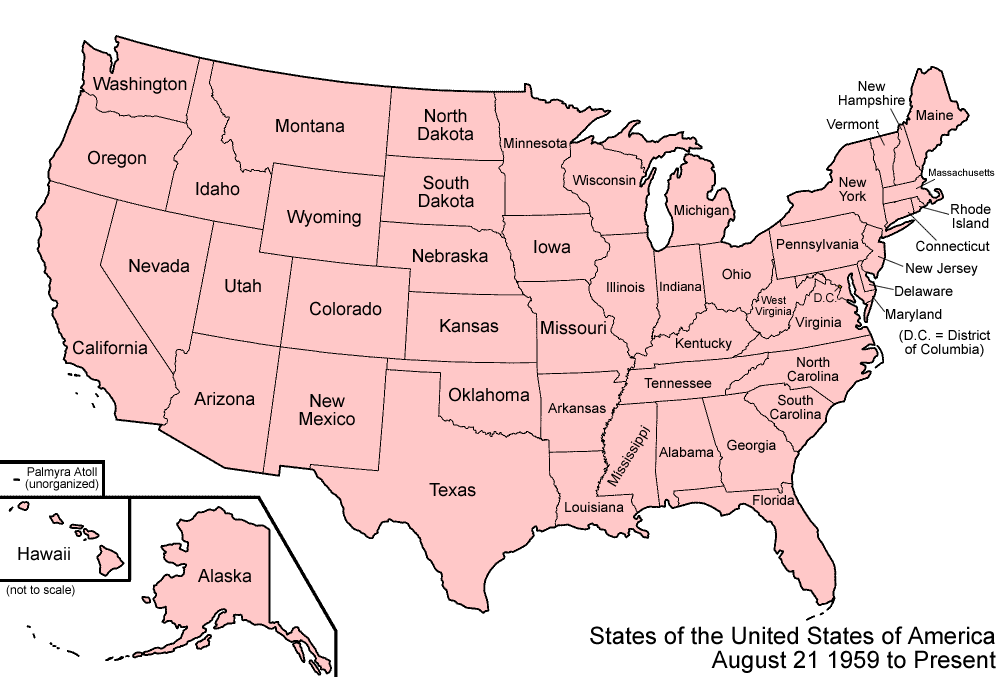
American period: An enlargeable map of the United States as it has been since 1959.

The following timeline traces the territorial evolution of California, the thirty-first state admitted to the United States of America, including the process of removing Indigenous Peoples from their native lands, or restricting them to reservations.

== Timeline (Note: Flag icons are shown each time a new national claim was made, or a new national flag was raised over California.) ==
=== Indigenous & territorial claims prior to 1768 ===
- Indigenous peoples of California, see Before 1768 map
- Broad early European edicts and treaties that unknowingly included the land that would later become California
  - Inter caetera papal bull issued by Pope Alexander VI, 1493
  - Treaty of Tordesillas, 1494
  - Vasco Núñez de Balboa claims South Sea (Pacific Ocean) and all adjoining lands for Spain, 1513
  - Treaty of Saragossa, 1529
- Early European claims on California soil
  - Rio de Buen Guia (Colorado River) claim made by Hernando de Alarcon on behalf of Spain, September 1540
  - Rio de Tizon Delta (Imperial Valley) claim made by Melchor Diaz on behalf of Spain, December 1540.
  - San Miguel (San Diego) claim made by Juan Rodríguez Cabrillo on behalf of Spain, 1542
  - New Albion ( Point Reyes) claim made by Sir Francis Drake on behalf of England, 1579
  - Rio Colorado (Colorado River) claim made by Juan de Onate on behalf of Spain, January 1605
  - Rio Colorado (Yuma Crossing) claim made by Eusebio Kino on behalf of Spain, 1701

=== Spanish period (1768–1821) ===
- (Spanish Empire) Las Californias claimed by Spain under the governance of the Viceroyalty of New Spain, 1768–1804
- Portolá-Crespí Expedition 1769–1771, Discovers Most of California Coast from San Diego to San Francisco, Claims Land for Spain.
- Pedro Fages 1st Expedition 1770 Discovers East San Francisco Bay, Salinas Valley & Santa Clara Valley.
- Pedro Fages 2nd Expedition 1772 Discovers San Joaquin Valley, Old Tejon Pass, & Antelope Valley.
- Juan Bautista de Anza Expeditions 1774; 1775 Brings settlers to California to settle Coastal Areas in the name of Spain.
- Juan de Ayala Naval Expedition 1775. First to sail past Golden Gate and discover San Francisco Bay.
- Francisco Garcés Expedition 1776 Discovers Mojave Desert, Cajon Pass, & San Bernardino Valley. Explores Old Tejon Pass, & Tulare Lake Basin.
- Pedro Fages Expedition in 1781 was Sent to put down Yuma Indian rebellion in the Colorado River but lost control of the area to Indians, essentially closing the main overroute trail connection from Alta California to Mexico.
- Hermenegildo Sal Expedition 1796 Explores San Joaquin Valley around the current Stockton area
  - Spanish missions in California, 1769–1833
    - Relocation of Mission Indians, 1769–1834
  - Spanish rancho land grants, 1769–1821
  - Peace of Paris, 1783
- Alta California Province established, 1804–1821
- Friar Juan Martin Expedition 1804, Explores the southern Central Valley Region for new mission sites. Visits Salinan Tco'alam Village which he names Cholam Village
- Friar Juan Martin Expedition 1805, Explores Lake Tulare Region for new mission sites. Visits Yokut Wowal Village which he names Bubal Village
- José María de Zalvidea Expedition 1806, Scouting for new Mission sites from Santa Barbara Mission to San Gabriel Mission.
- Lt. Francisco María Ruiz Expedition 1806, Explores route from Sonora to Central Valley via Old Tejon Pass, Discovers Cãnada de las Uvas (Tejon Pass) which opens a new route to Mission San Fernando.
- Gabriel Moraga Expedition 1806, Discovers Sierra Nevada Foothills and it's Rivers. Explores Tulare region, and Kern River Wilderness.
- Friar Francisco Dumetz Expedition 1810, Discovers San Bernardino Valley.
  - Fort Ross established by the Russian-American Company, 1812–1842
    - Northern California coast claimed by Ivan Kuskov on behalf of Russia, 1812
  - Adams-Onis Treaty of 1819
- Mexican War of Independence, 1808–1821
  - Monterey, California held by Hippolyte Bouchard on behalf of Argentina (6 days), 1818
  - Treaty of Córdoba signed August 21, 1821

=== Mexican period (1821–1848) ===
- Alta California Province transferred to Mexico after Treaty of Córdoba, 1821–1824
  - (Mexico) Army of the Three Guarantees, 1821
  - Mexican rancho land grants, 1821–1846
- (Mexico) First Mexican Empire, 1821–1823
- Provisional Government of Mexico, 1823–1824
- Captain José Romero Expedition December 1823– January 1824 Discovers Valle de la Palma de Dios (Coachella Valley) exploring a route through the Sonoran Desert to Tucson Pueblo. attempting to establish the Landroute connection between California and Mexico abandoned since 1781.
- First Mexican Republic, 1824–1835
  - Alta California Territory established via the 1824 Constitution of Mexico, 1824–1836
  - Treaty of Limits (Mexico–United States), 1828
  - Mexican secularization act of 1833
- Centralist Republic of Mexico, 1835–1846
  - California's Lone Star coup and declaration of independence, 1836
  - Las Californias Department established by Las Siete Leyes (The Seven Laws), 1836–1846
- Second Federal Republic of Mexico, 1846–1848
  - Alta California Territory reestablished when 1824 Constitution of Mexico was restored, 1846–1848
- Mexican–American War, 1846–1848
  - California Republic (25 days), 1846
  - U.S. military government of California, 1846–1849
  - Treaty of Cahuenga signed January 13, 1847
  - Treaty of Guadalupe Hidalgo signed February 2, 1848
    - Mexican Cession of 1848

=== American period (1848–present) ===
- Alta California administered by the United States as part of the Mexican Cession unorganized territory, 1848–1850
  - Provisional government of California, 1849–1850
  - State of Deseret (extralegal), 1849–1850
  - Constitution of California (see California Constitutional Boundaries), October 13, 1849
  - Compromise of 1850
- State of California since 1850
  - (United States) California Statehood Act, September 9, 1850
  - Act for the Government and Protection of Indians, April 22, 1850
    - California Indian Wars, 1850–1880
  - Aboriginal title in California, 1851–present
    - California Land Act of 1851
    - California Indian Reservations and Cessions, 1851–1892
    - Indian Reorganization Act of 1934
    - Indian Claims Act of 1946
    - California Act of 1949
    - California Rancheria Termination Acts, 1956–present
  - California-Nevada border disputes, 1856–1980
    - Nataqua Territory, 1856–1861
    - Roop County dispute, 1861–1864
  - California-Oregon border dispute, 1868–present

== California Constitutional boundaries ==
CONSTITUTION OF THE STATE OF CALIFORNIA (1849)

Article XII; Boundary

The Boundary of the State of California shall be as follows:
Commencing at this point of intersection of 42d degree of north latitude with the 120th degree of longitude west from Greenwich, and running south on the line of said 120th degree of west longitude until it intersects the 39th degree of north latitude; thence running in a straight line in a south easterly direction to the River Colorado, at a point where it intersects the 35th degree of north latitude; thence down the middle of the channel of said river, to the boundary line between the United States and Mexico, as established by the Treaty of May 30th, 1848; thence running west and along said boundary line to the Pacific Ocean, and extending therein three English miles; thence running in a northwesterly direction, and following the direction of the Pacific Coast to the 42d degree of north latitude, thence on the line of said 42d degree of north latitude to the place of beginning. Also all the islands, harbors, and bays, along adjacent to the Pacific Coast.

== See also ==
- Bibliography of California history
- Aboriginal title in the United States
- History of California
  - Historical outline of California
  - Conquest of California
  - Flag of California
  - California Genocide
  - An Act for the Admission of the State of California
  - Partition and secession in California
  - Yes California
- Territorial evolution of North America since 1763
  - Territorial evolution of Mexico
  - Territorial evolution of the United States

Territorial evolution of Arizona
Territorial evolution of Nevada
Territorial evolution of Oregon

- Laws of the Indies
  - Encomienda
  - New Laws
