= Outline of Oregon territorial evolution =

Overview of and topical guide to Oregon territorial evolution

Legend for maps

U.S. state
U.S. territory
Claimed by other countries
Disputed

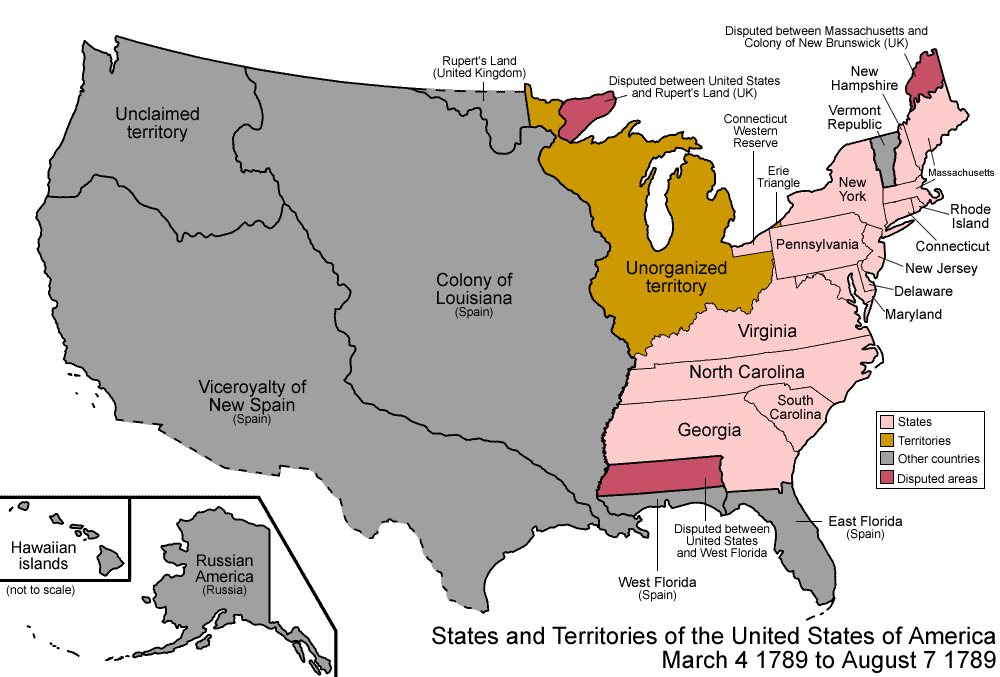
An enlargeable map of the United States after the Treaty of Paris in 1789

The following outline traces the territorial evolution of the U.S. state of Oregon.

== Outline ==
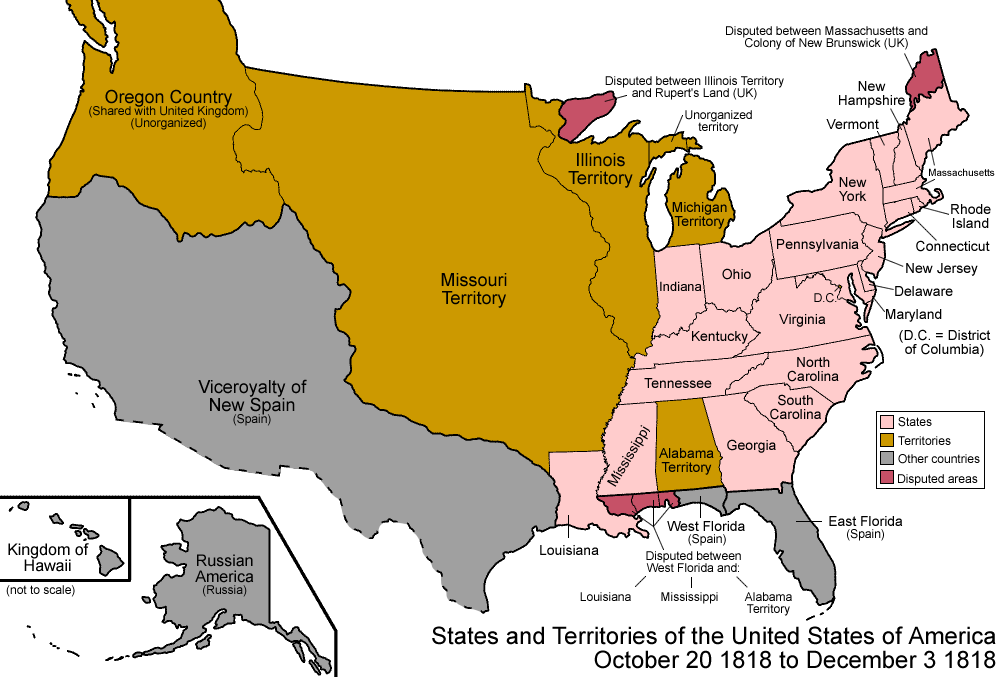
An enlargeable map of the United States after the Anglo-American Convention of 1818

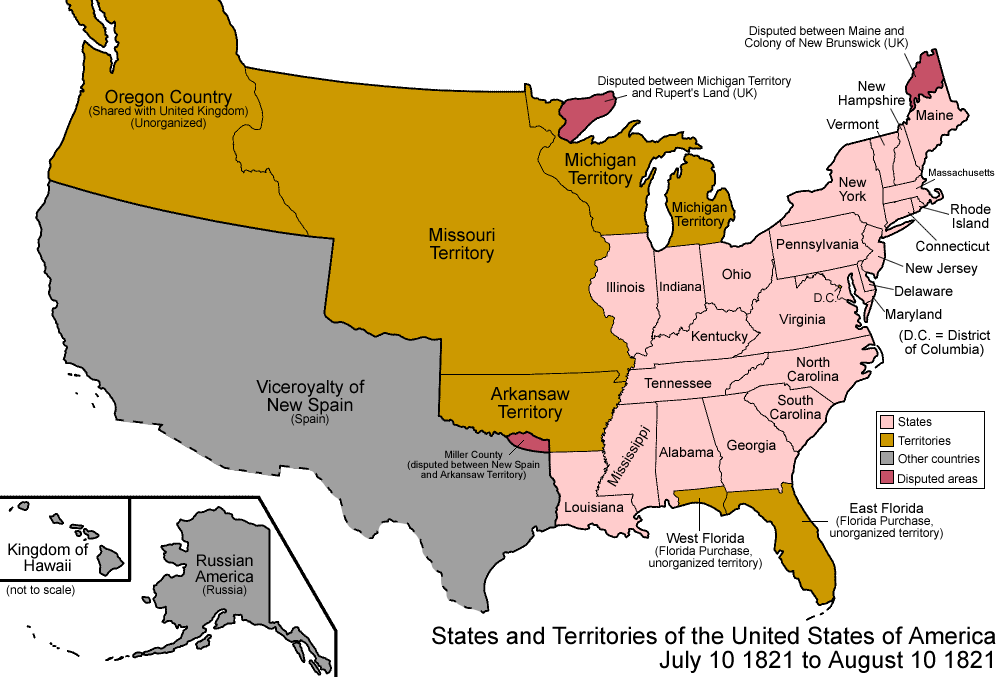
An enlargeable map of the United States after the Adams-Onís Treaty took effect in 1821

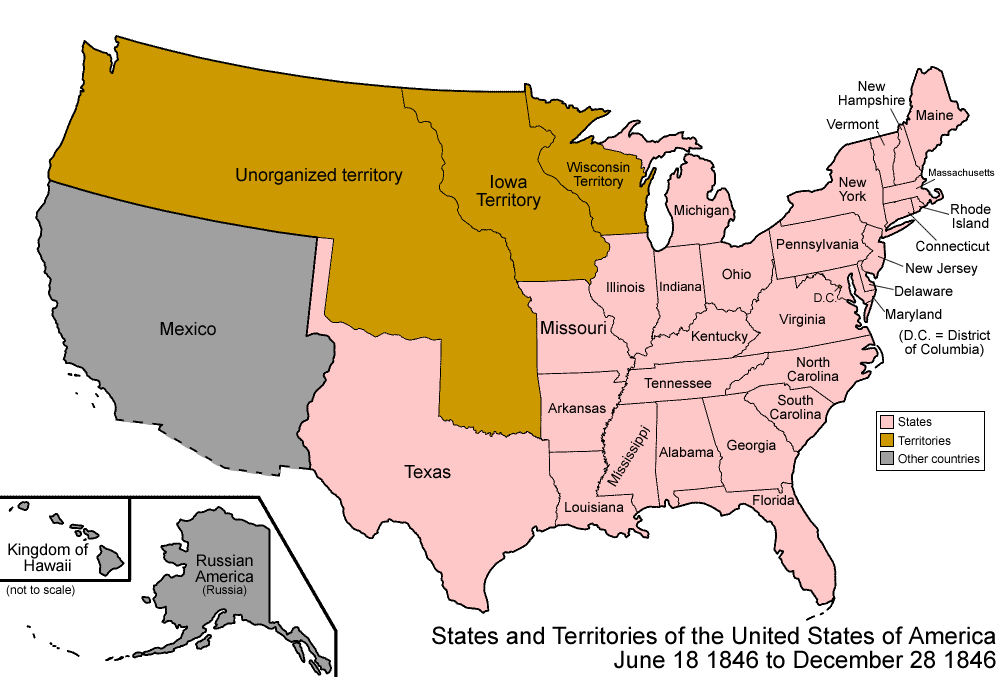
An enlargeable map of the United States after the Oregon Treaty of 1846

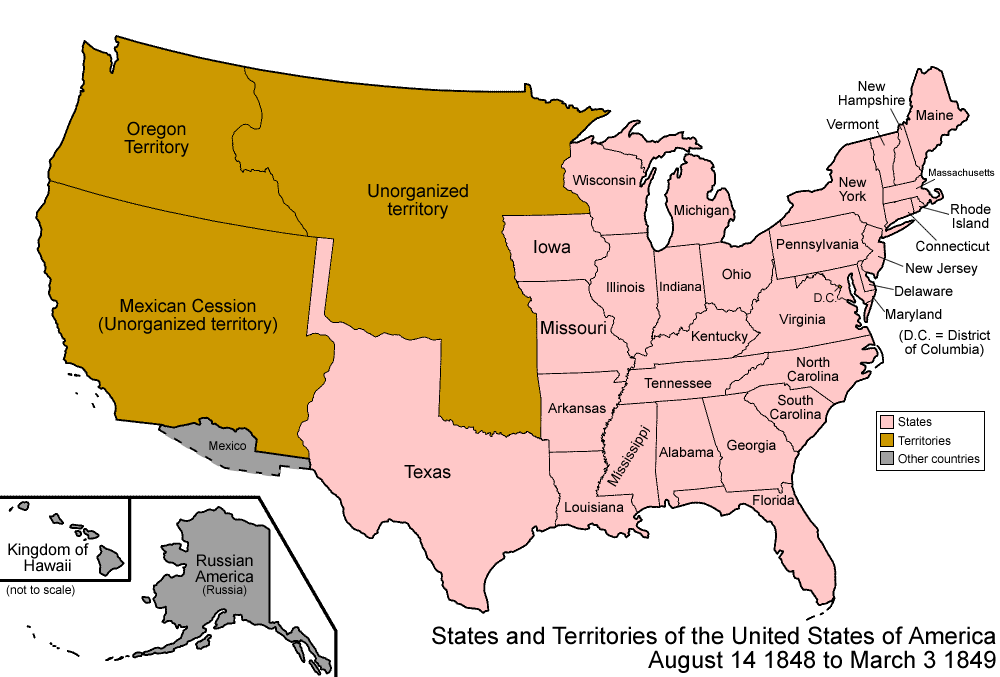
An enlargeable map of the United States after the Oregon Organic Act in 1848

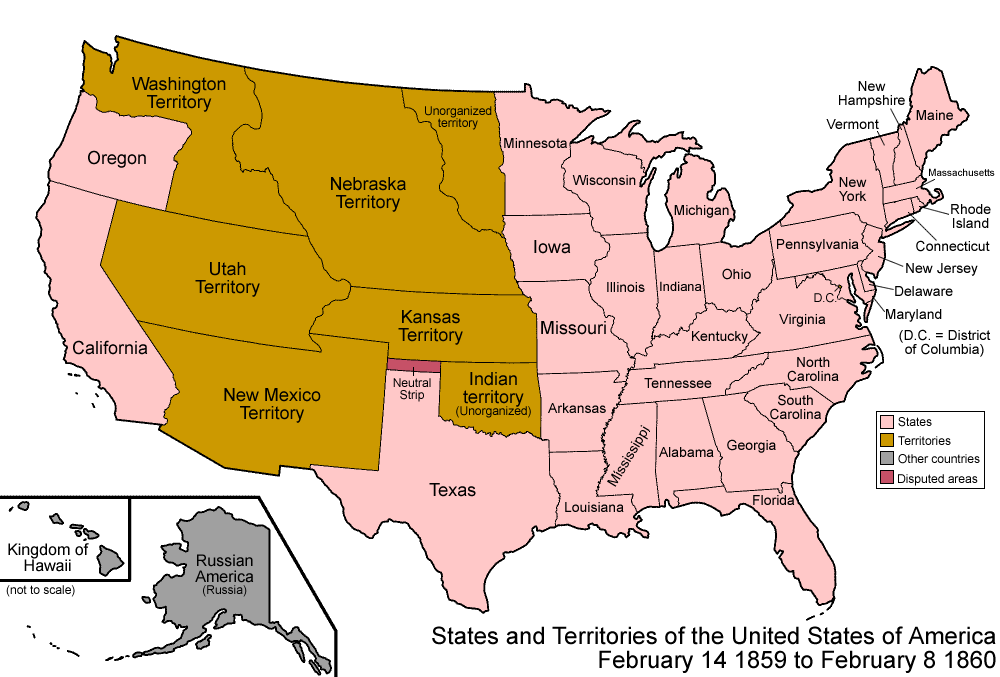
An enlargeable map of the United States after Oregon Statehood in 1859

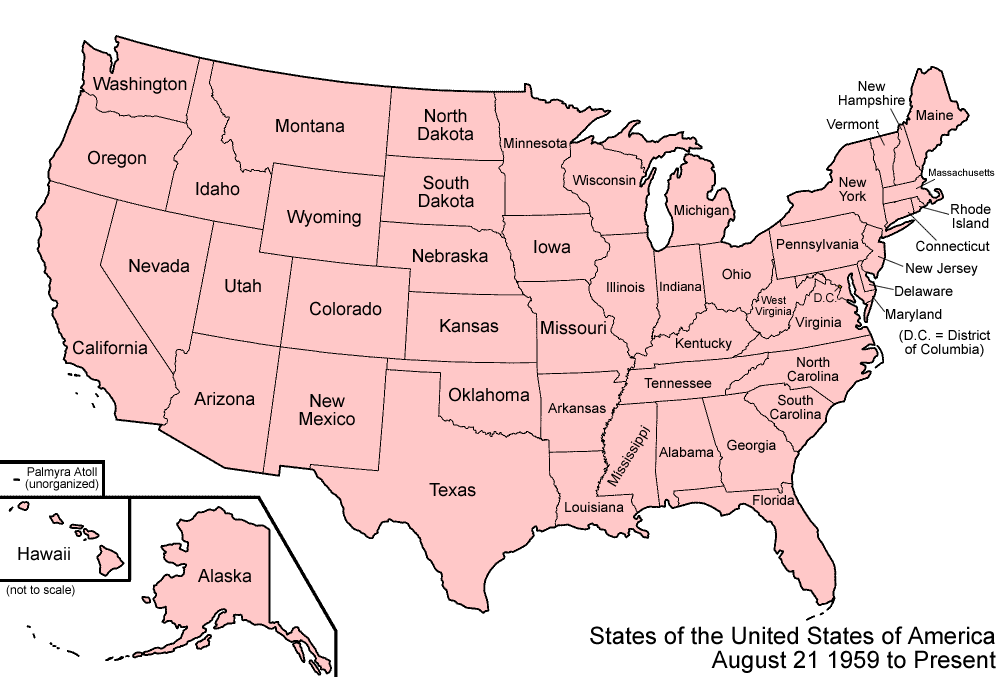
An enlargeable map of the United States as it has been since 1959

- Historical territorial claims of Spain in the present state of Oregon:
  - Nueva California, 1768–1804
  - Gran Cuenca, 1776–1821
  - Alta California, 1804–1821
  - Adams-Onis Treaty of 1819
- Historical international territory in the present state of Oregon:
  - Oregon Country, 1818–1846
    - Anglo-American Convention of 1818
    - Provisional Government of Oregon (extralegal), 1843–1849
    - Oregon Treaty of 1846
- Historical political divisions of the United States in the present state of Oregon:
  - Unorganized territory created by the Oregon Treaty, 1846–1848
  - Territory of Oregon, 1848–1859
    - Oregon Organic Act, August 14, 1848
    - Northern portion of Oregon Territory incorporated in new Washington Territory, March 2, 1853
  - State of Deseret (extralegal), 1849–1850
  - State of Oregon since 1859
    - Oregon Statehood Act, February 14, 1859 (Eastern portion of territory transferred to Territory of Washington)

== See also ==
- Historical outline of Oregon
- History of Oregon
- Territorial evolution of the United States

Territorial evolution of California
Territorial evolution of Idaho
Territorial evolution of Nevada
(Washington (state)) Territorial evolution of Washington
