= Territorial evolution of Nevada =

History of the borders of the US state

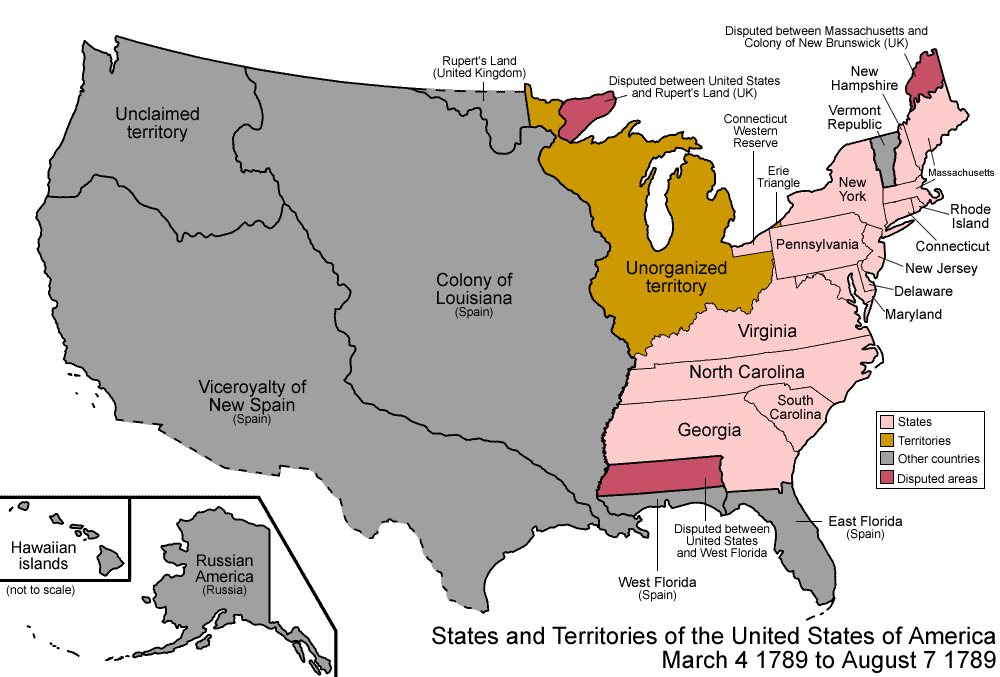
An enlargeable map of the United States after the Treaty of Paris in 1789

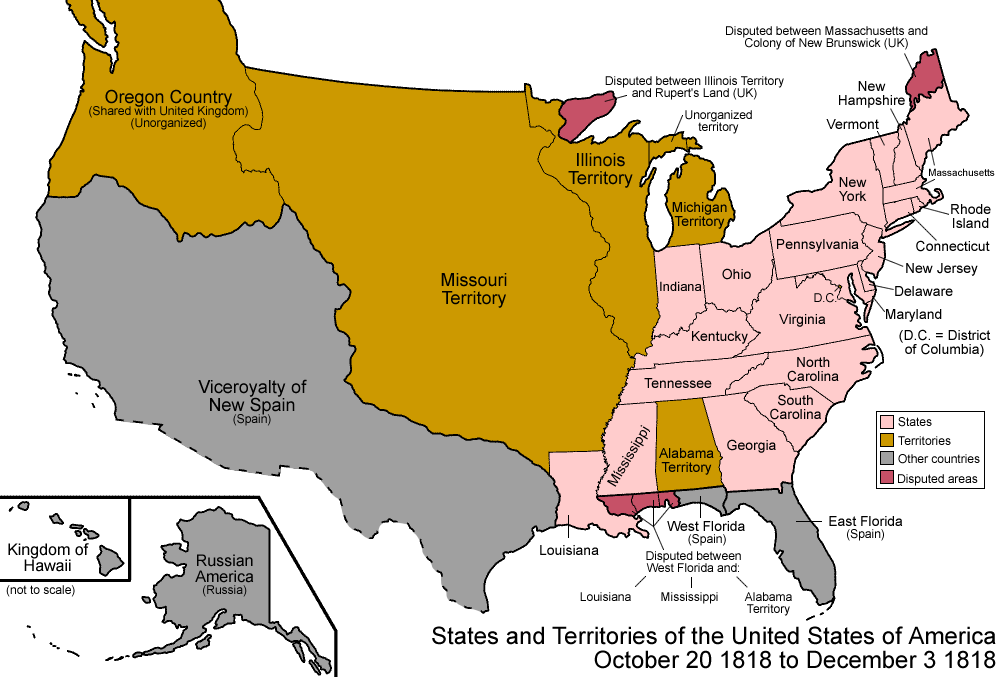
An enlargeable map of the United States after the Anglo-American Convention of 1818

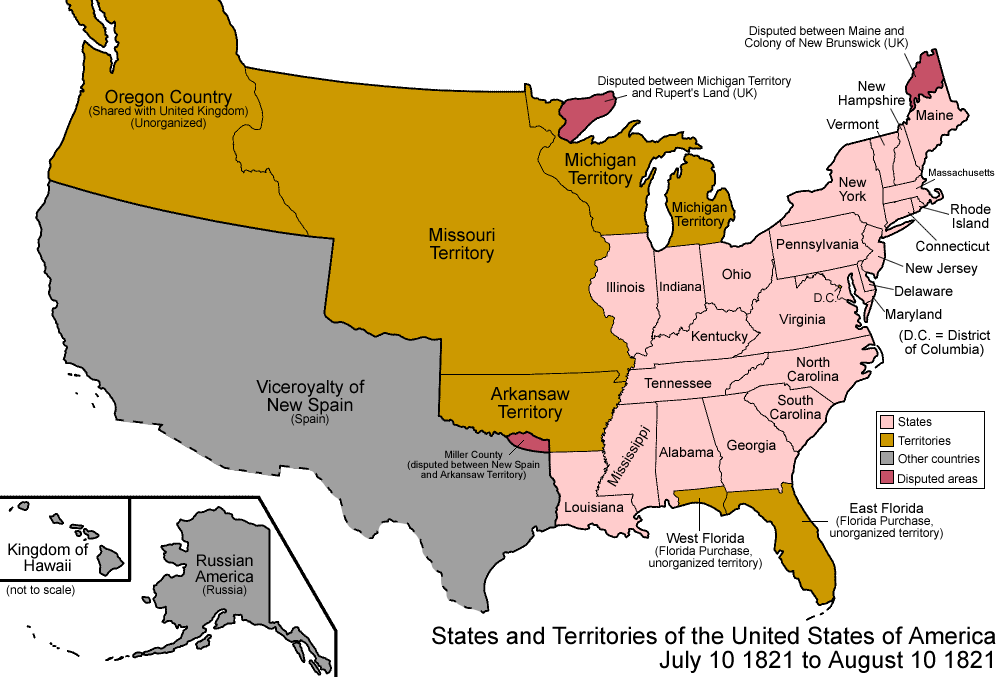
An enlargeable map of the United States after the Adams-Onís Treaty took effect in 1821

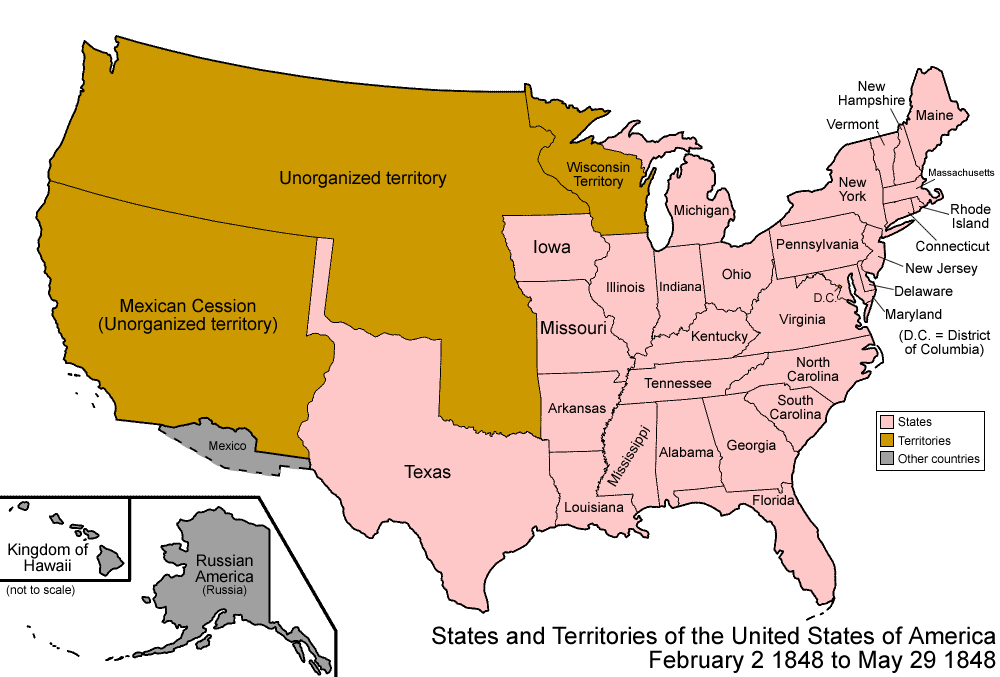
An enlargeable map of the United States after the Treaty of Guadalupe Hidalgo in 1848

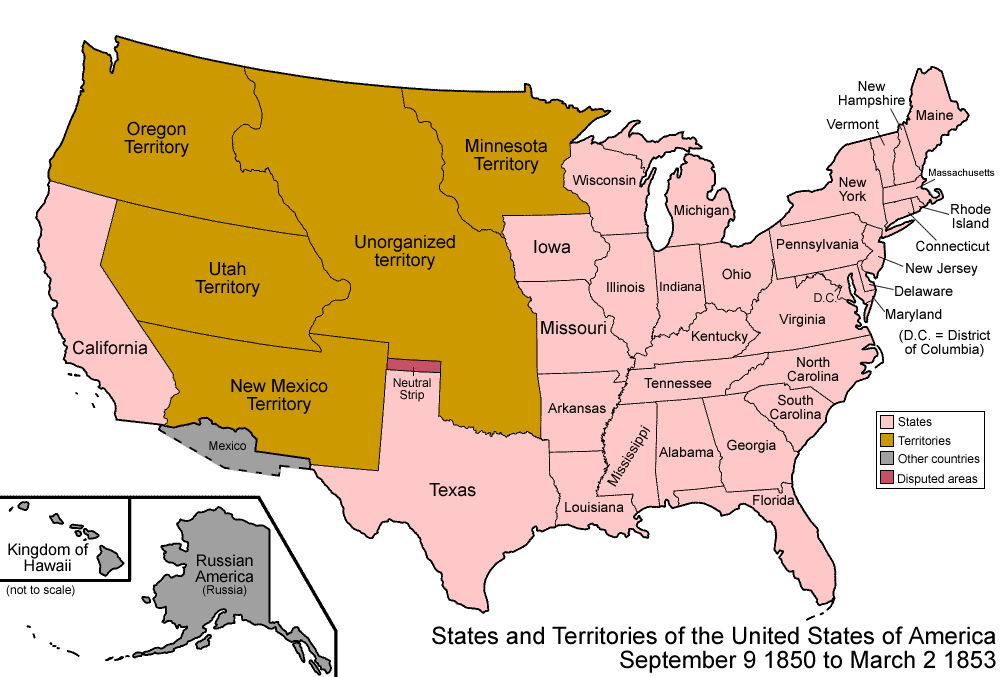
An enlargeable map of the United States after the Compromise of 1850

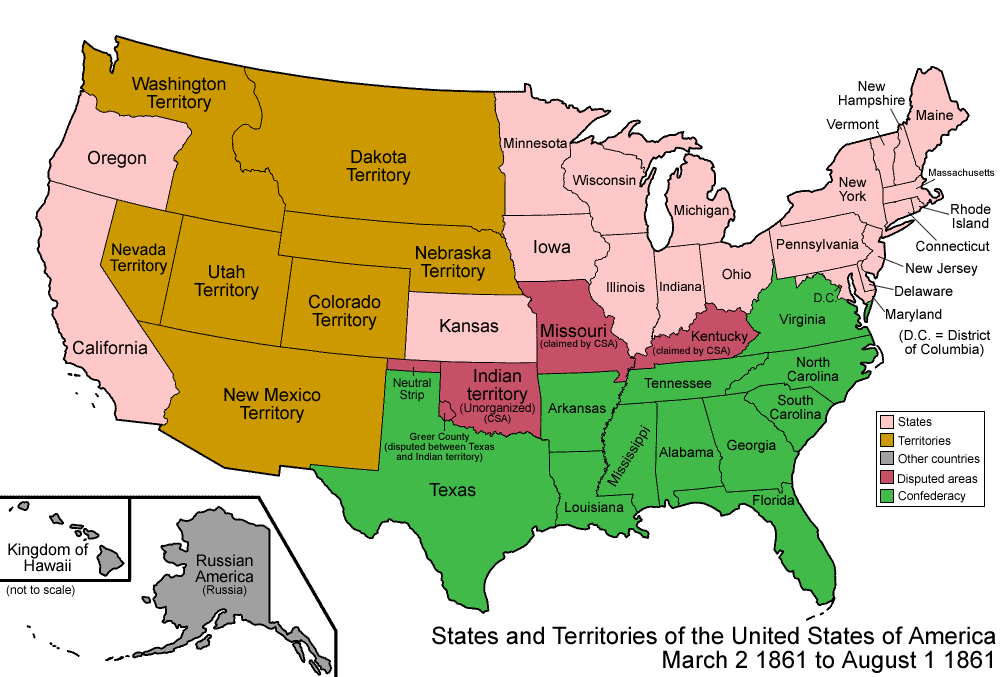
An enlargeable map of the United States after the Nevada Organic Act in 1861

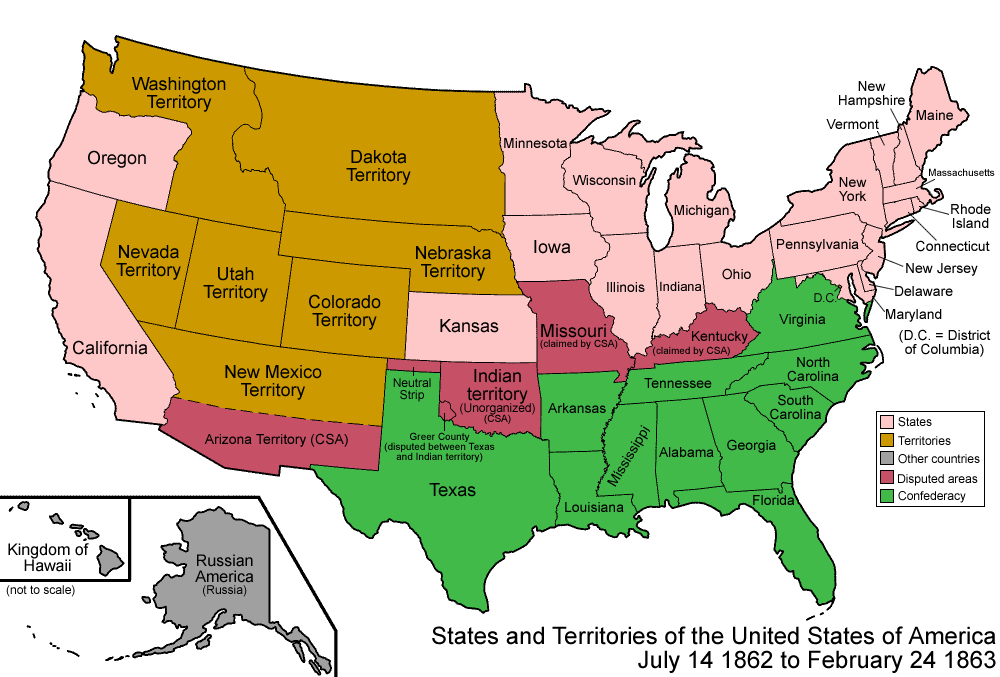
An enlargeable map of the United States after the first Utah annexation in 1862

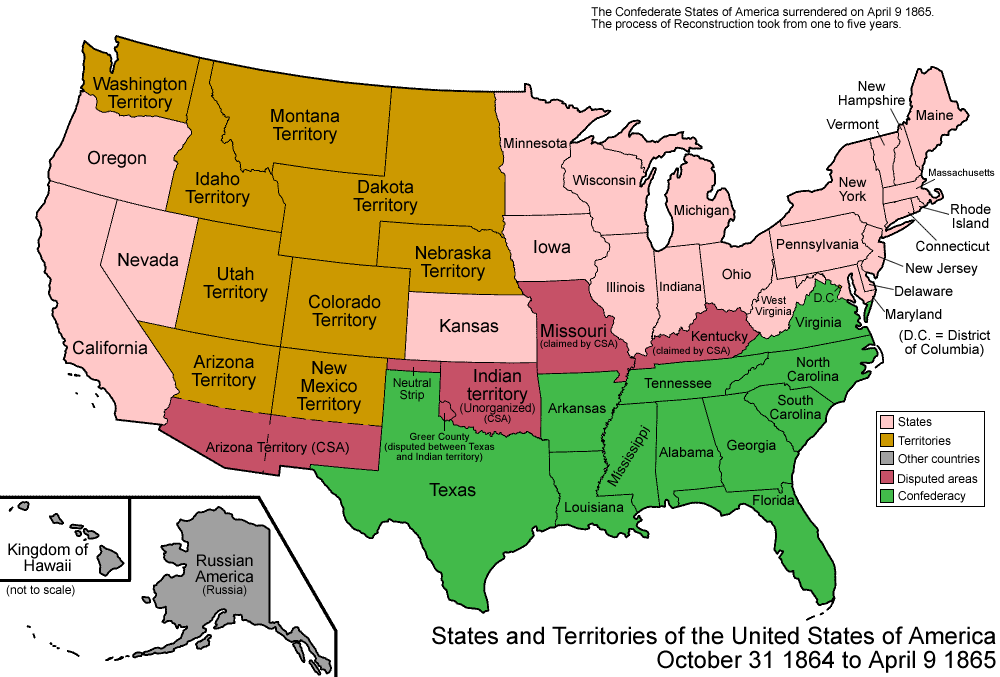
An enlargeable map of the United States after Nevada Statehood in 1864

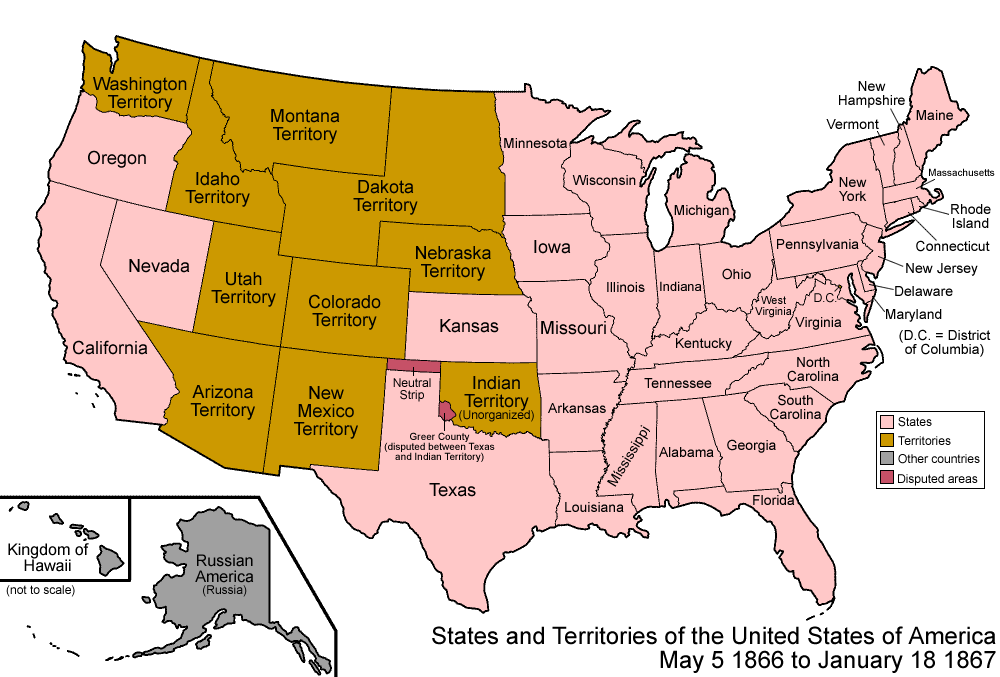
An enlargeable map of the United States after the second Utah annexation in 1866

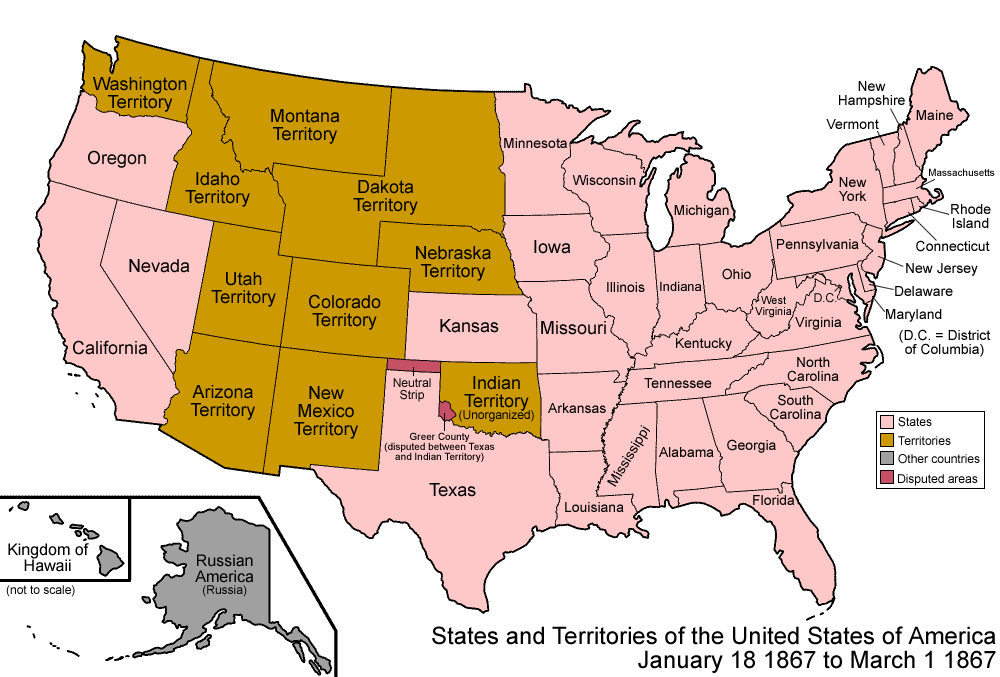
An enlargeable map of the United States after the Arizona annexation in 1867

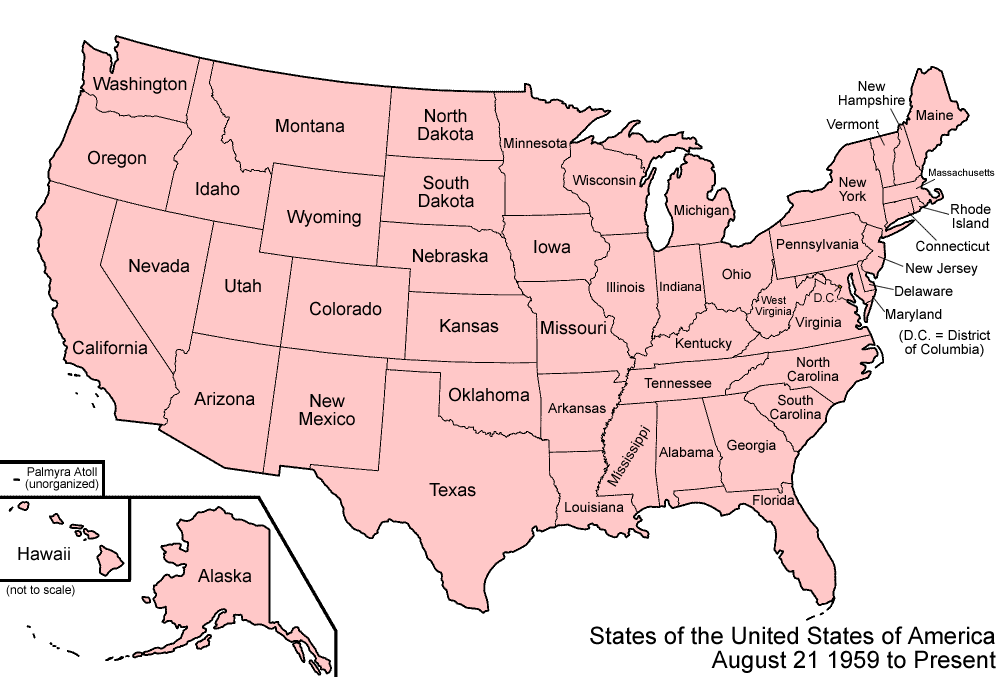
An enlargeable map of the United States as it has been since 1959

The following outline traces the territorial evolution of the U.S. State of Nevada.

== Outline ==
- Historical territorial claims of Spain in the present State of Nevada:
  - Nueva California, 1768–1804
  - Gran Cuenca, 1776–1821
  - Alta California, 1804–1821
    - Adams–Onis Treaty of 1819
- Historical international territory in the present State of Nevada:
  - Oregon Country, 1818–1846
    - Anglo-American Convention of 1818
- Historical territorial claims of Mexico in the present State of Nevada:
  - Gran Cuenca, 1821–1848
  - Alta California, 1821–1848
    - Treaty of Guadalupe Hidalgo of 1848
- Historical political divisions of the United States in the present State of Nevada:
  - Unorganized territory created by the Treaty of Guadalupe Hidalgo, 1848–1850
    - Compromise of 1850
  - State of Deseret (extralegal), 1849–1850
  - Territory of Utah, 1850–1896
  - Nataqua Territory (extralegal), 1856–1861
  - Territory of Nevada, 1861–1864
    - Nevada Organic Act, March 2, 1861
    - Western 53 miles of the Utah Territory is transferred to the Territory of Nevada, July 14, 1862
    - Nevada Enabling Act, March 21, 1864
  - State of Nevada since 1864
    - Nevada Statehood, October 31, 1864
    - Another 53 miles of western Utah Territory is transferred to the State of Nevada, May 5, 1866
    - Northwestern corner of the Arizona Territory is transferred to the State of Nevada, January 18, 1867

== See also ==
- Historical outline of Nevada
- History of Nevada
- Territorial evolution of the United States

Territorial evolution of Arizona
Territorial evolution of California
Territorial evolution of Idaho
Territorial evolution of Oregon
Territorial evolution of Utah
