= Outline of North Dakota territorial evolution =

Overview of and topical guide to North Dakota territorial evolution

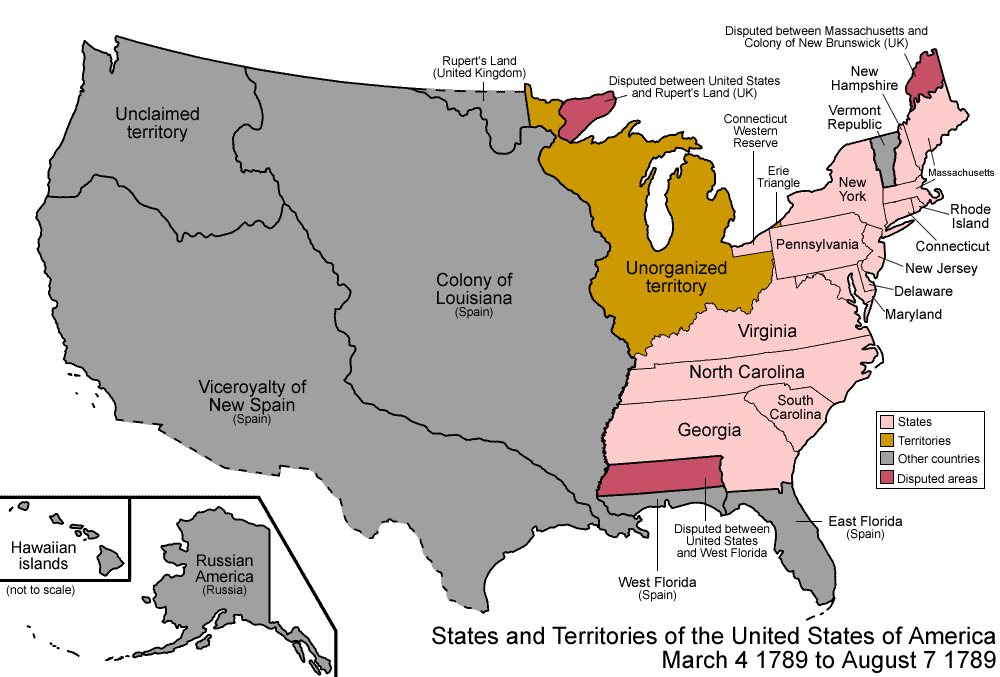
An expandable map of the United States after the Treaty of Paris in 1789

The following outline traces the territorial evolution of the U.S. State of North Dakota.

== Outline ==
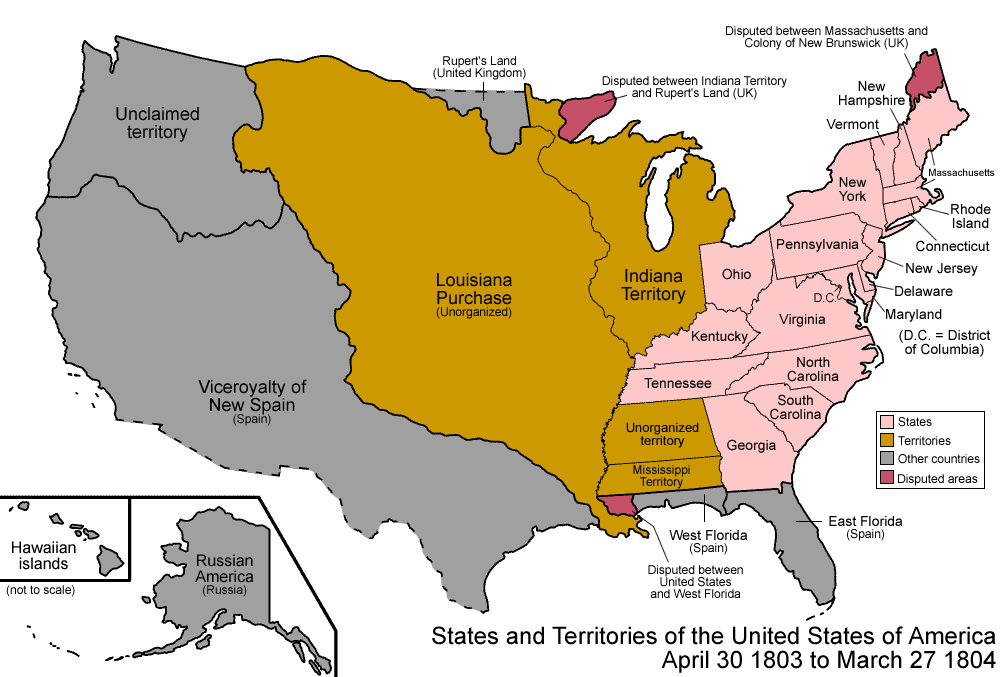
An enlargeable map of the United States after the Louisiana Purchase in 1803

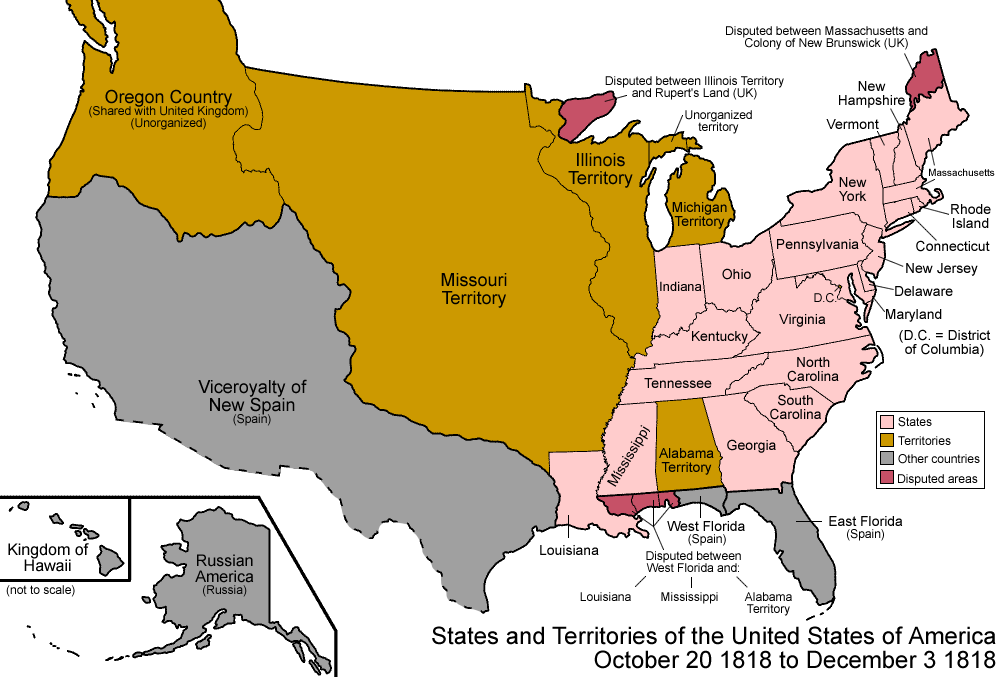
An enlargeable map of the United States after the Anglo-American Convention of 1818

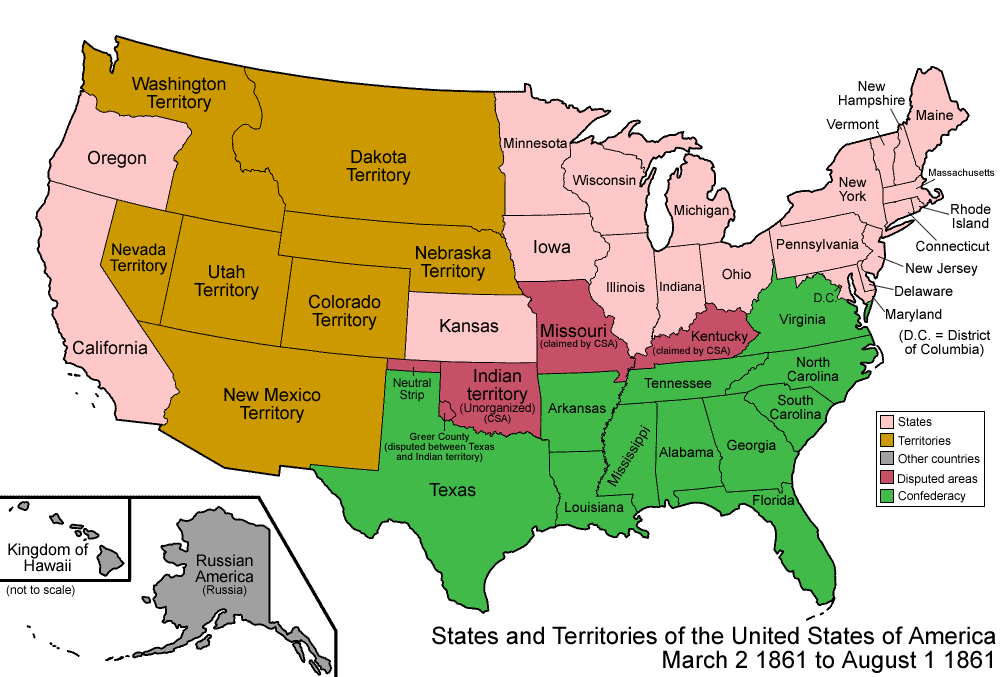
An enlargeable map of the United States after the Dakota Organic Act of 1861

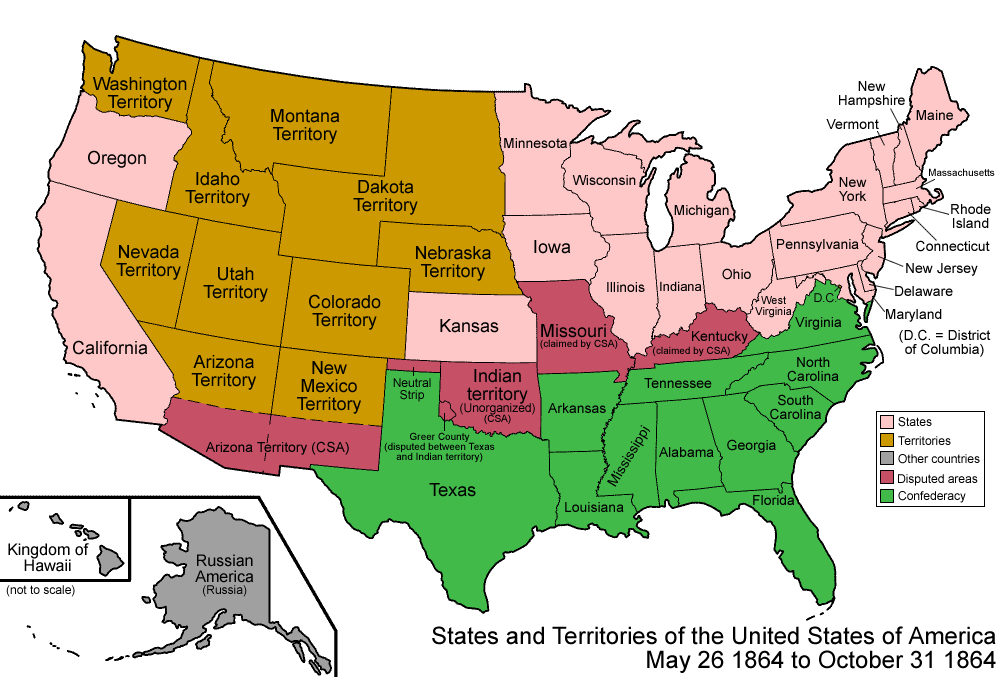
An enlargeable map of the United States after the Montana Organic Act of 1864

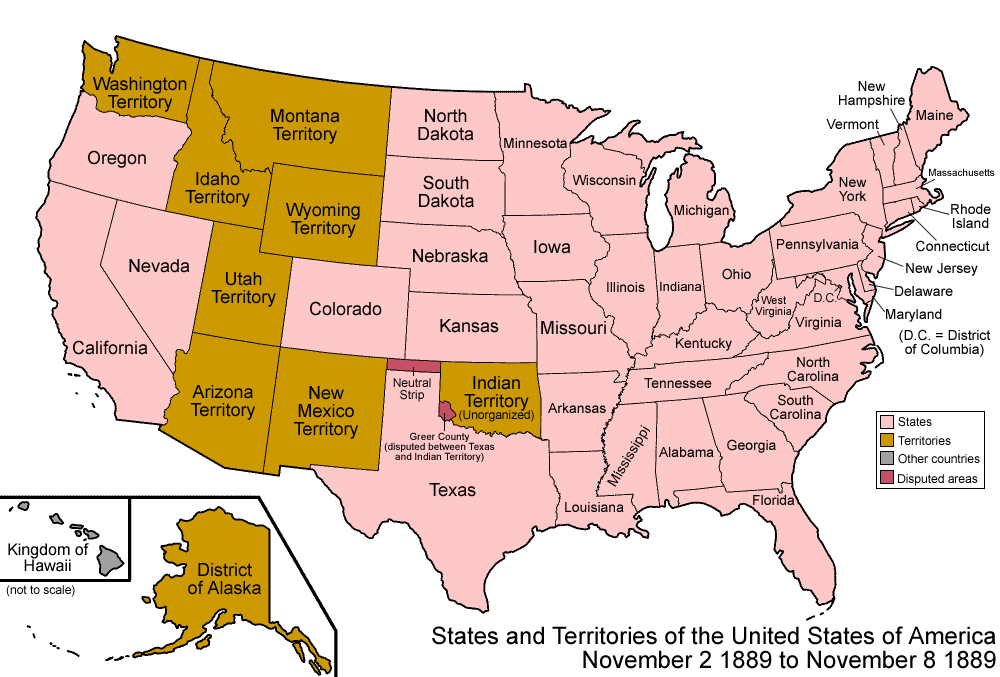
An enlargeable map of the United States after North Dakota statehood in 1889

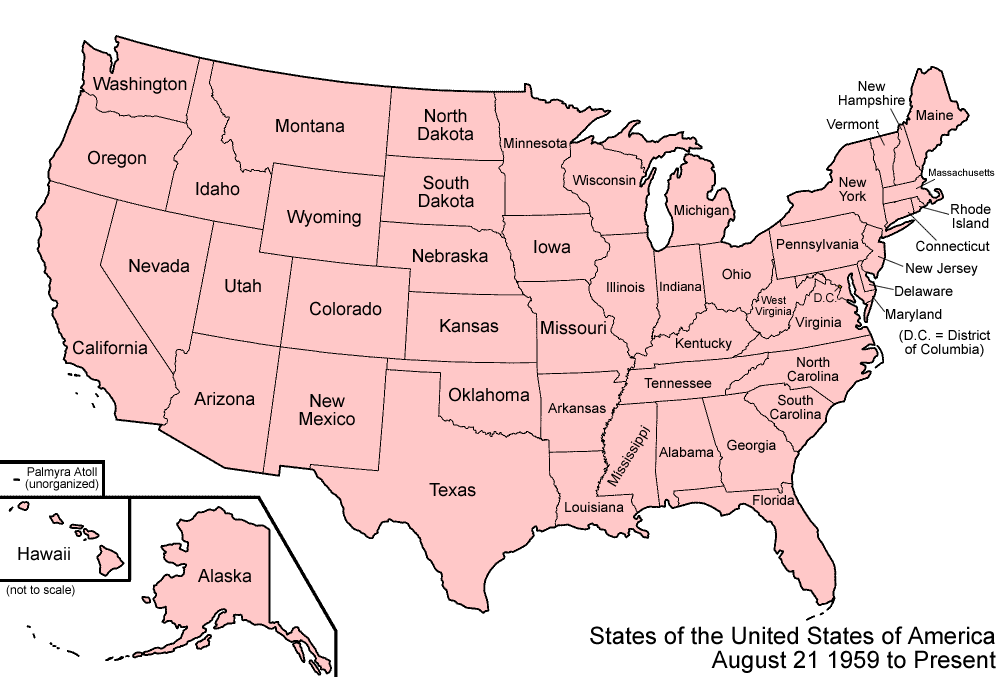
An enlargeable map of the United States as it has been since 1959

- Historical territorial claims of the United Kingdom in the present State of North Dakota:
  - Rupert's Land, 1670–1870
    - Anglo-American Convention of 1818
- Historical territorial claims of France in the present State of North Dakota:
  - Louisiane, 1682–1764
    - Treaty of Fontainebleau of 1762
- Historical territorial claims of Spain in the present State of North Dakota:
  - Luisiana, 1764–1803
    - Third Treaty of San Ildefonso of 1800
- Historical territorial claims of France in the present State of North Dakota:
  - Louisiane, 1803
    - Vente de la Louisiane of 1803
- Historical political divisions of the United States in the present State of North Dakota:
  - Unorganized territory created by the Louisiana Purchase, 1803–1804
  - District of Louisiana, 1804–1805
  - Territory of Louisiana, 1805–1812
  - Territory of Missouri, 1812–1821
  - Unorganized territory formerly the northwestern Missouri Territory, 1821–1854
    - Treaty of Fort Laramie of 1851
  - Territory of Michigan east of Missouri River and White Earth River, 1805-(1834–1836)-1837
  - Territory of Wisconsin east of Missouri River and White Earth River, (1836–1838)-1848
  - Territory of Iowa east of Missouri River and White Earth River, 1838–1846
  - Territory of Minnesota east of Missouri River and White Earth River, 1849–1858
  - Territory of Nebraska west of Missouri River or White Earth River, (1854–1861)-1867
  - Territory of Dakota, 1861–1889
  - State of North Dakota, since November 2, 1889

== See also ==
- Historical outline of North Dakota
- History of North Dakota
- Territorial evolution of the United States

Territorial evolution of Minnesota
Territorial evolution of Montana
Territorial evolution of South Dakota
