= Territorial evolution of South Dakota =

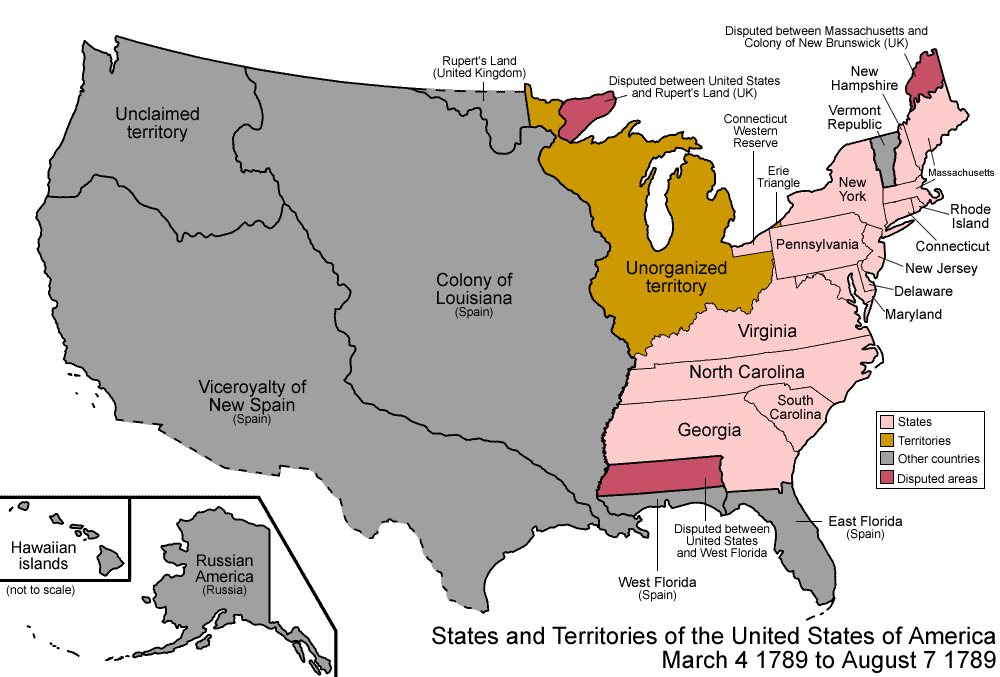
An enlargeable map of the United States after the Treaty of Paris in 1789

The following outline traces the territorial evolution of the U.S. state of South Dakota.

== Outline ==
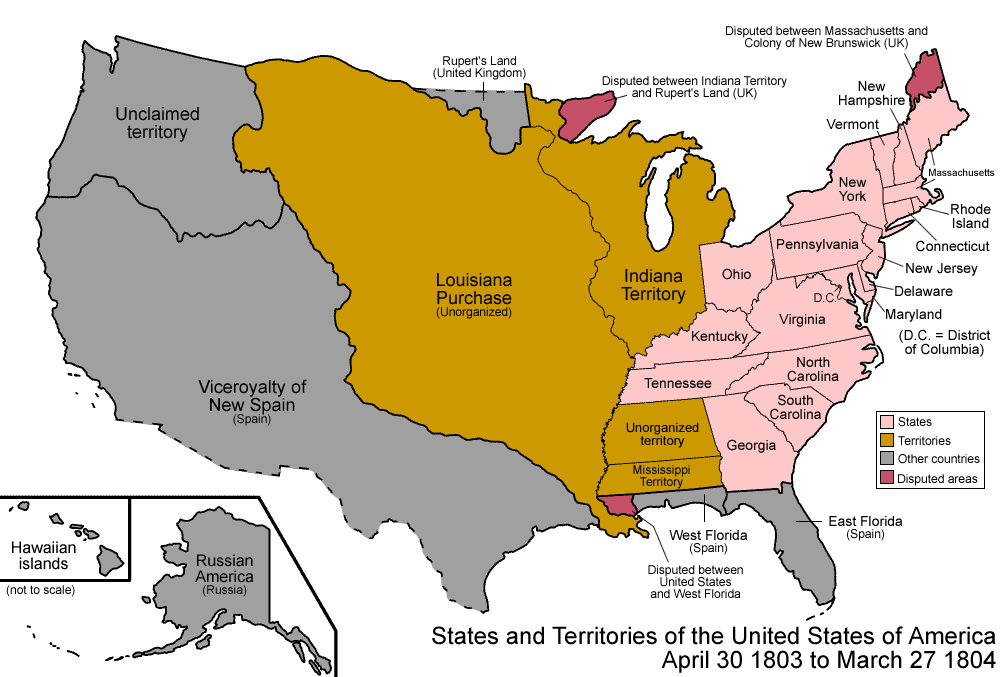
An enlargeable map of the United States after the Louisiana Purchase in 1803

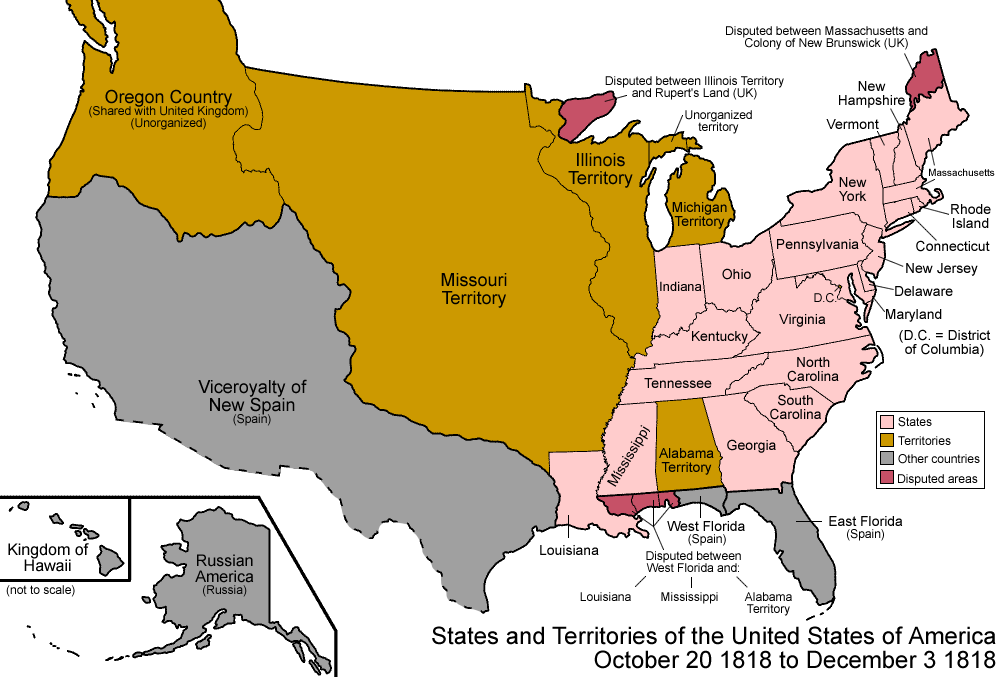
An enlargeable map of the United States after the Anglo-American Convention of 1818

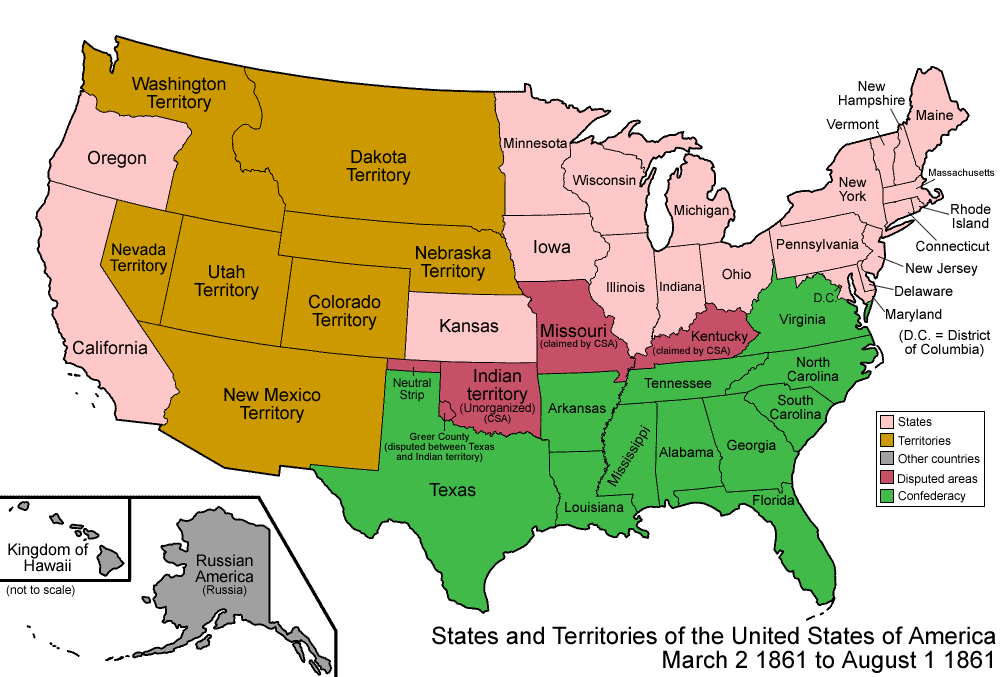
An enlargeable map of the United States after the Dakota Organic Act of 1861

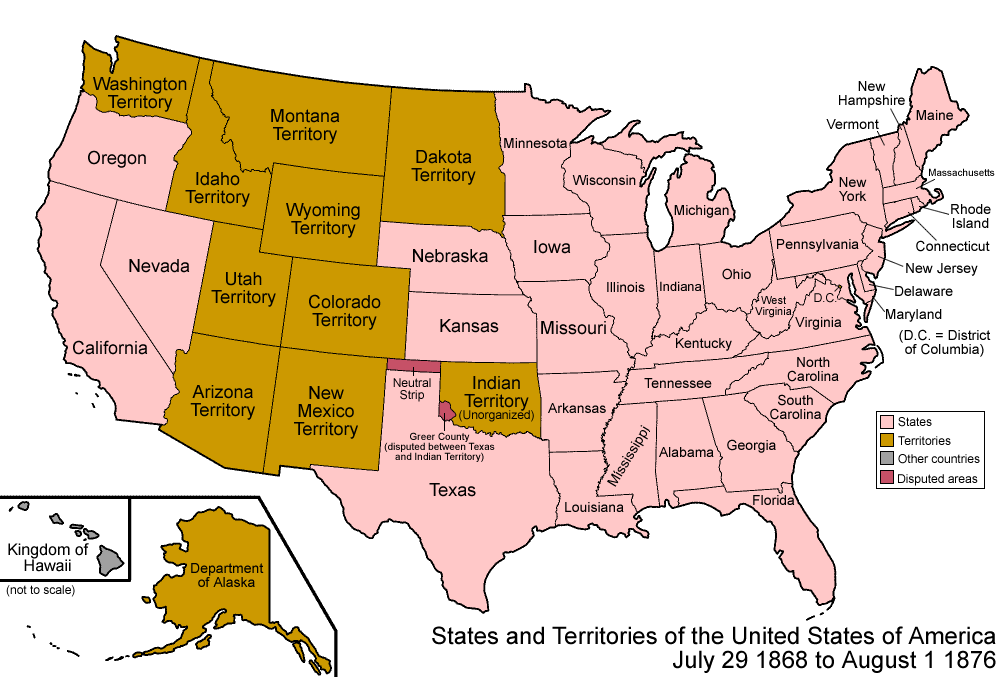
An enlargeable map of the United States after the Wyoming Organic Act of 1868

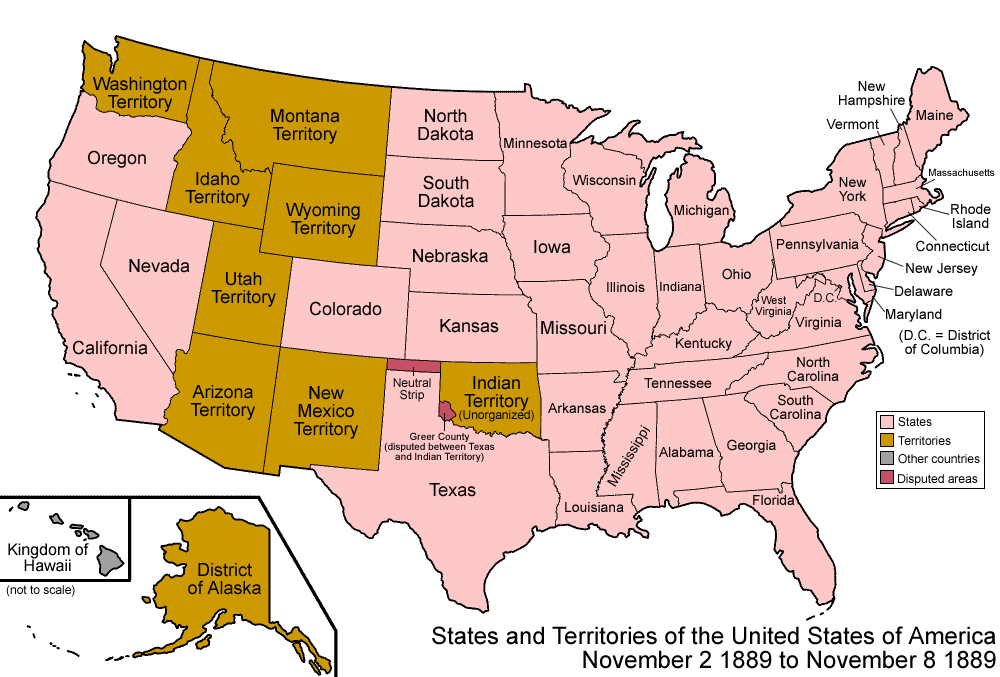
An enlargeable map of the United States after South Dakota statehood in 1889

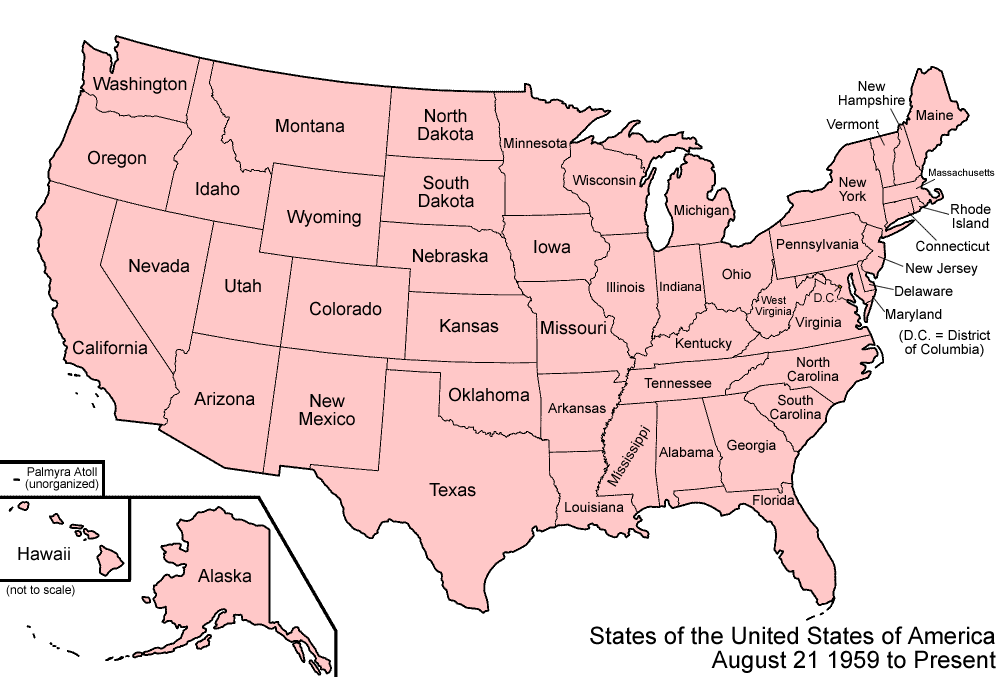
An enlargeable map of the United States as it has been since 1959

- Historical territorial claims of the United Kingdom in the present State of South Dakota:
  - Rupert's Land, 1670–1870
    - Anglo-American Convention of 1818
- Historical territorial claims of France in the present State of South Dakota:
  - Louisiane, 1682–1764
    - Treaty of Fontainebleau of 1762
- Historical territorial claims of Spain in the present State of South Dakota:
  - Luisiana, 1764–1803
    - Third Treaty of San Ildefonso of 1800
- Historical territorial claims of France in the present State of South Dakota:
  - Louisiane, 1803
    - Vente de la Louisiane of 1803
- Historical political divisions of the United States in the present State of South Dakota:
  - Unorganized territory created by the Louisiana Purchase, 1803–1804
  - District of Louisiana, 1804–1805
  - Territory of Louisiana, 1805–1812
  - Territory of Missouri, 1812–1821
  - Unorganized territory formerly the northwestern Missouri Territory, 1821–1854
    - Treaty of Fort Laramie of 1851
  - Territory of Michigan east of Missouri River, 1805-(1834–1836)-1837
  - Territory of Wisconsin east of Missouri River, (1836–1838)-1848
  - Territory of Iowa east of Missouri River, 1838–1846
  - Territory of Minnesota east of Missouri River, 1849–1858
  - Territory of Nebraska west of Missouri River, (1854–1861)-1867
  - Territory of Dakota, 1861-1889
    - Land between the 43rd parallel north and Keya Paha River or Niobrara River was transferred to the State of Nebraska, 1882
  - State of South Dakota, since November 2, 1889

== See also ==
- Historical outline of South Dakota
- History of South Dakota
- Territorial evolution of the United States

Territorial evolution of Iowa
Territorial evolution of Minnesota
Territorial evolution of Montana
Territorial evolution of Nebraska
Territorial evolution of North Dakota
Territorial evolution of Wyoming
