= Territorial evolution of Montana =

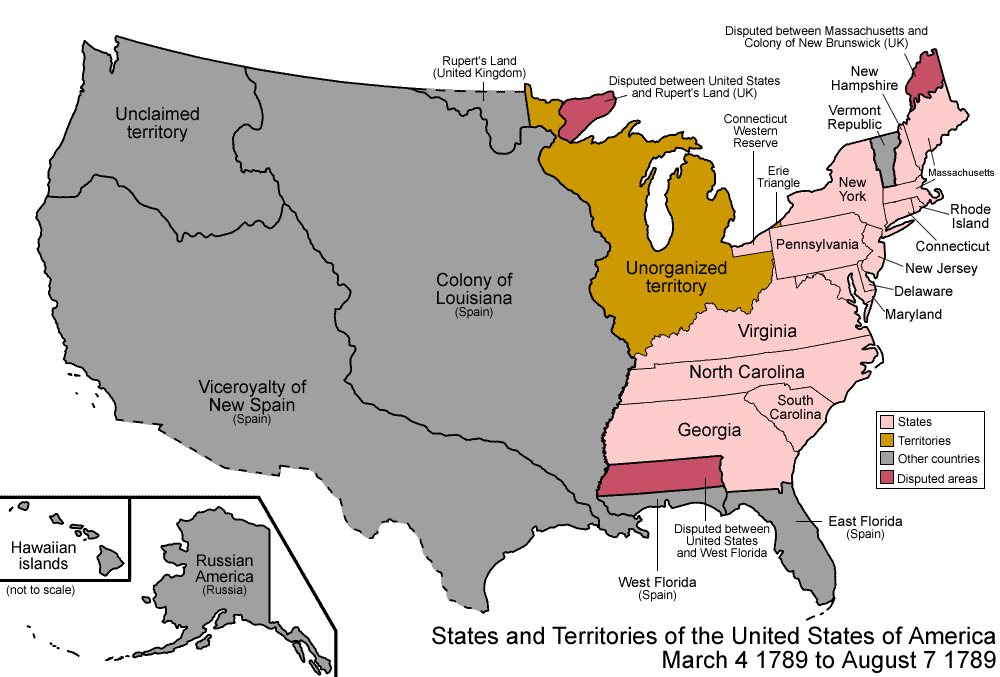
An enlargeable map of the United States after the Constitution of the United States was ratified on March 4, 1789.

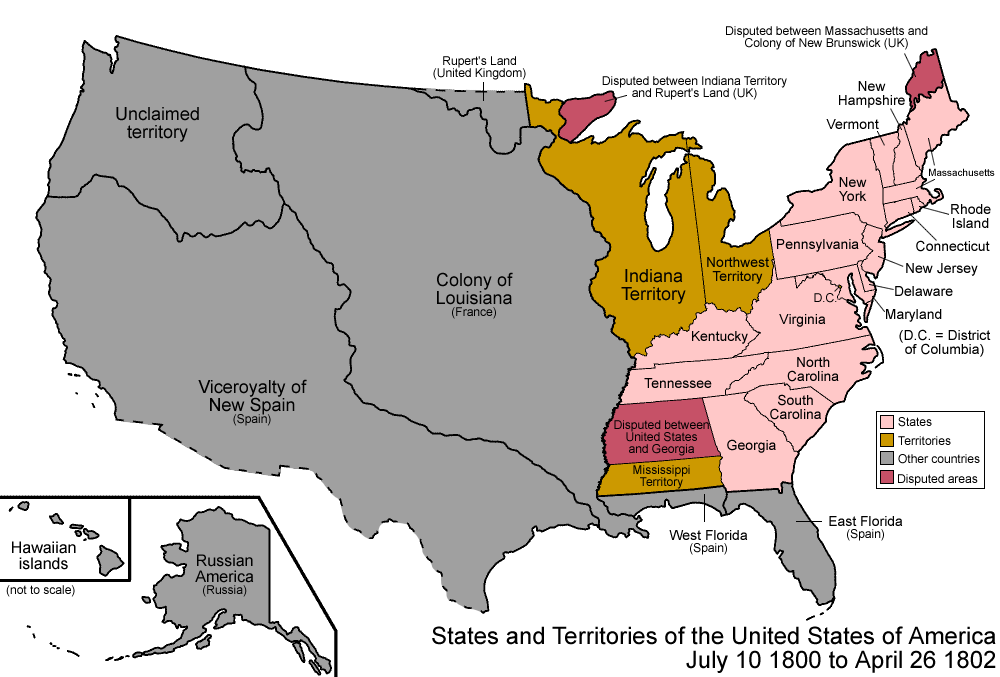
An enlargeable map of the United States after the secret Third Treaty of San Ildefonso transferred the Spanish colony of la Luisiana to the French Republic on October 1, 1800.

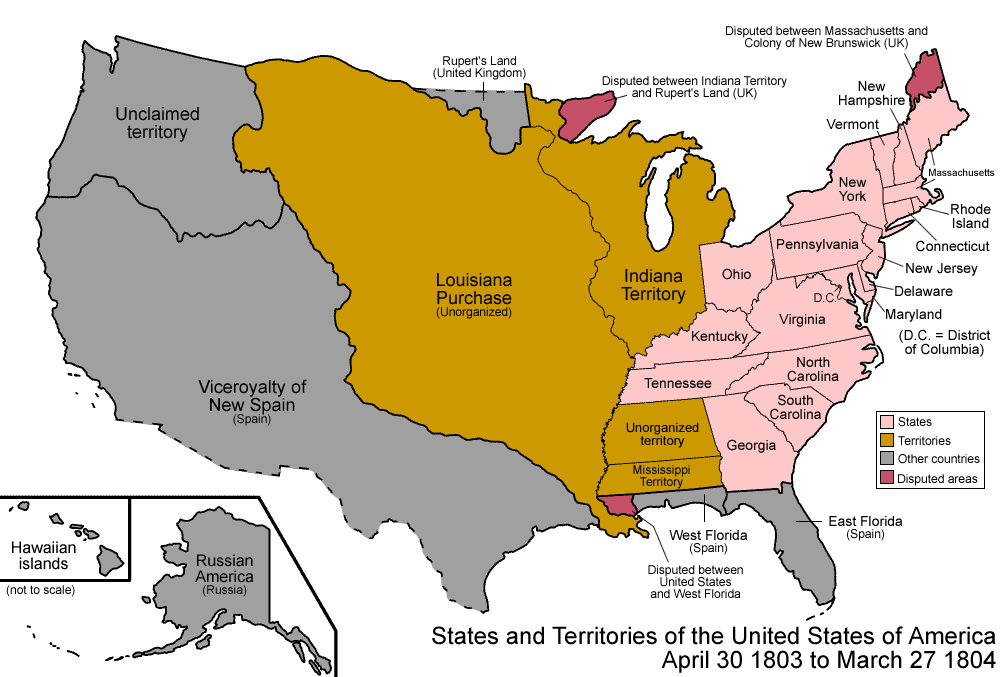
An enlargeable map of the United States after the Louisiana Purchase took effect on December 20, 1803.

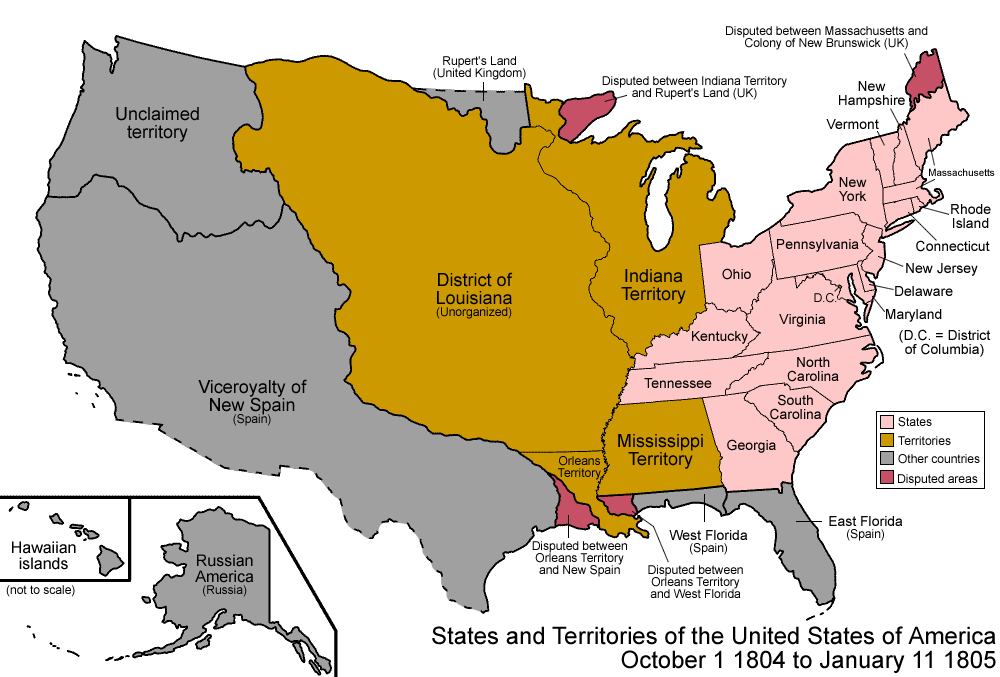
An enlargeable map of the United States after the creation of the District of Louisiana on March 26, 1804.

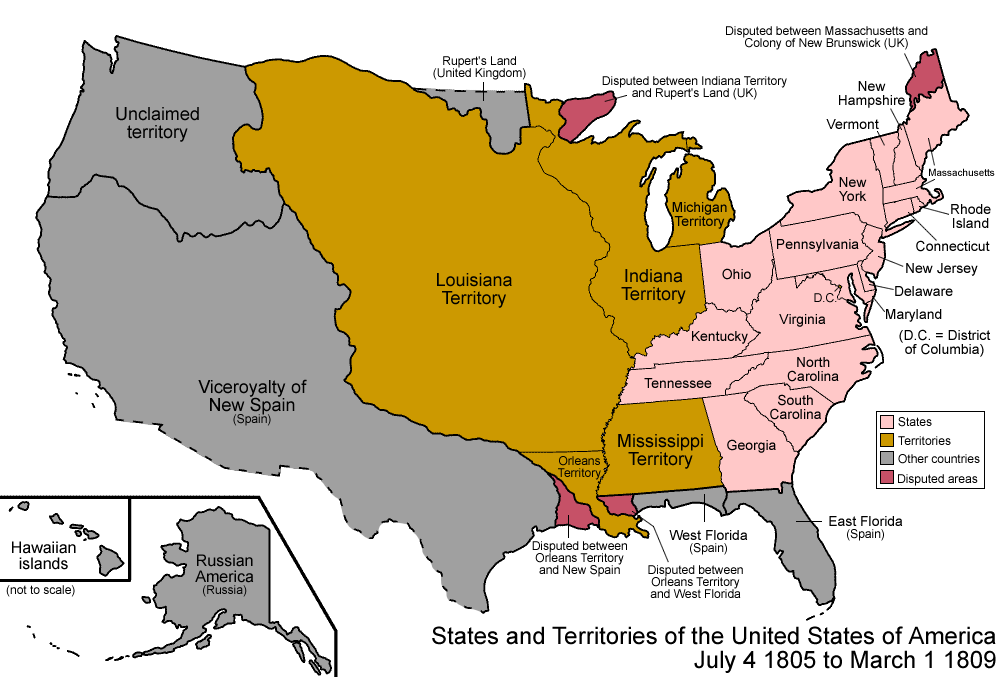
An enlargeable map of the United States after the creation of the Territory of Louisiana on March 3, 1805.

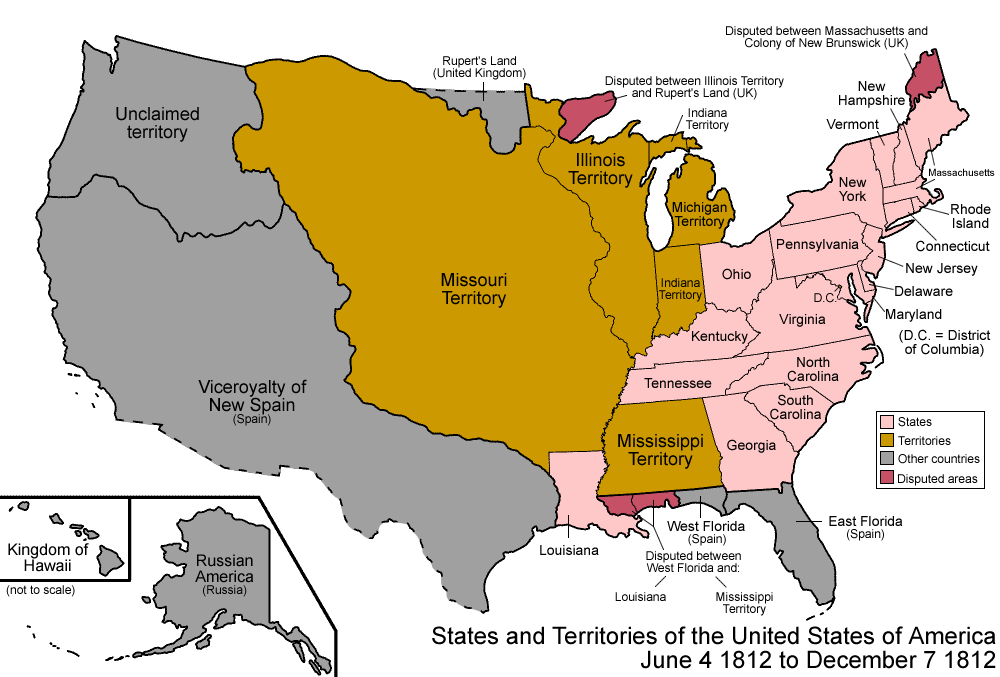
An enlargeable map of the United States after the creation of the Territory of Missouri on June 4, 1812.

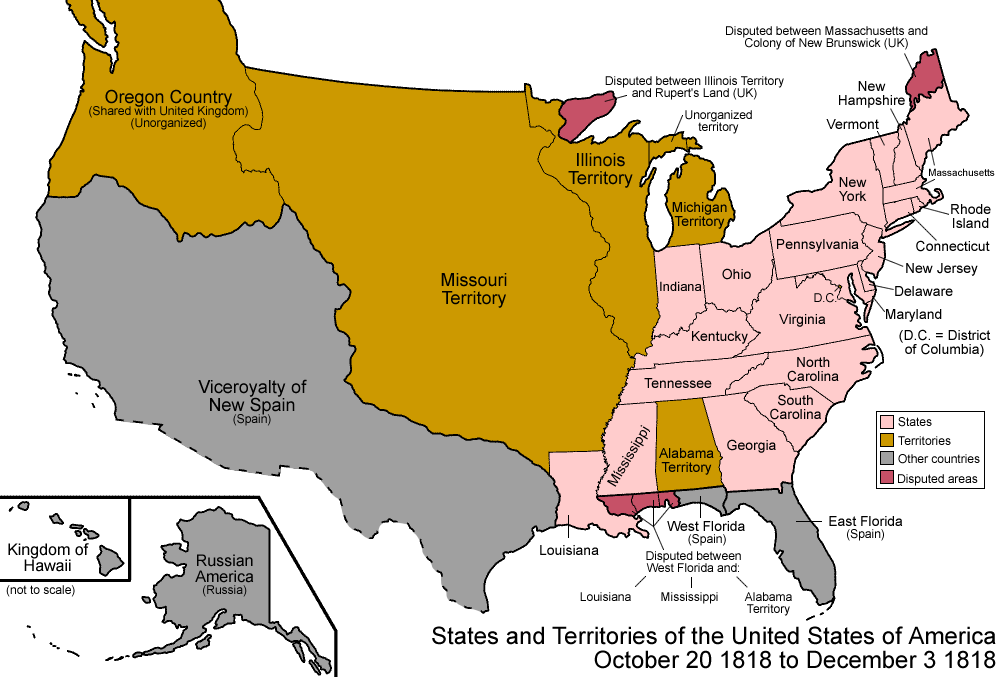
An enlargeable map of the United States after the Treaty of 1818 took effect on January 30, 1819.

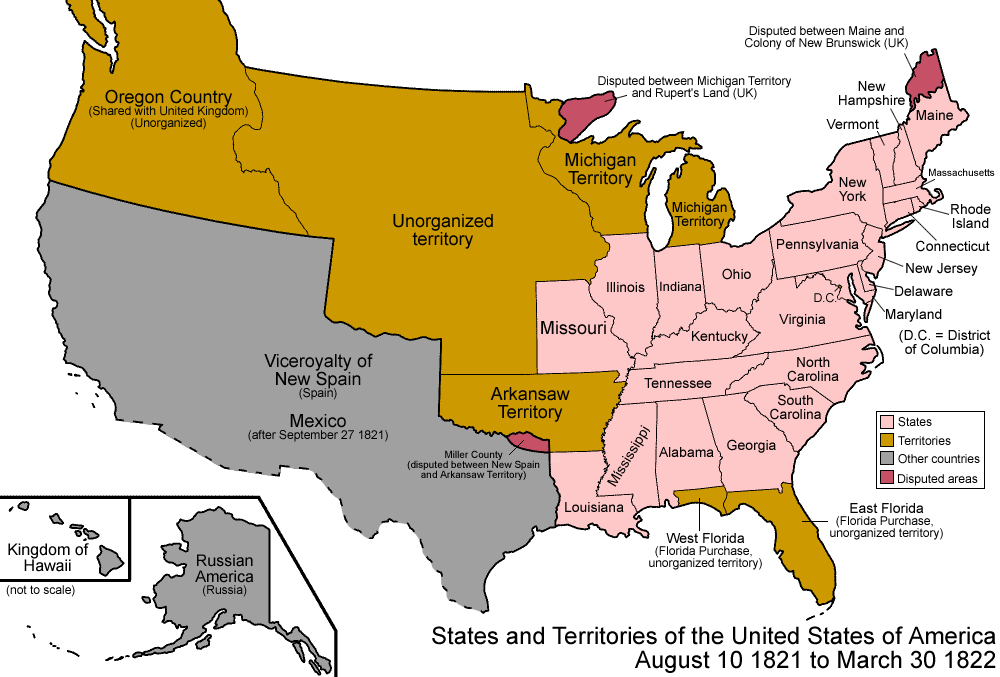
An enlargeable map of the United States after Missouri was admitted to the Union on August 10, 1821.

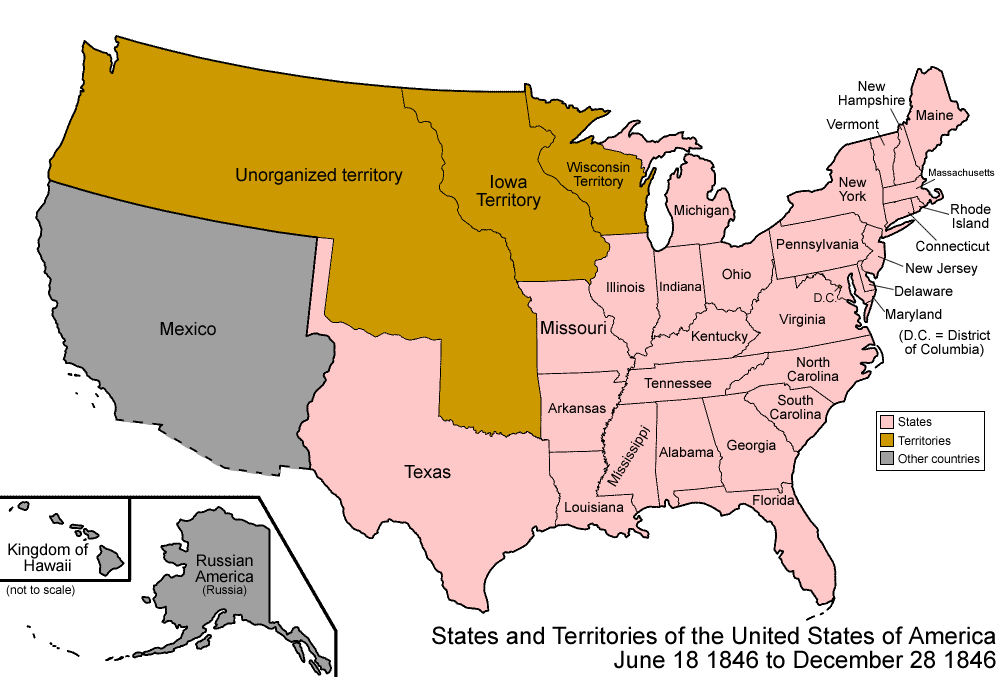
An enlargeable map of the United States after the Oregon Treaty took effect July 17, 1846

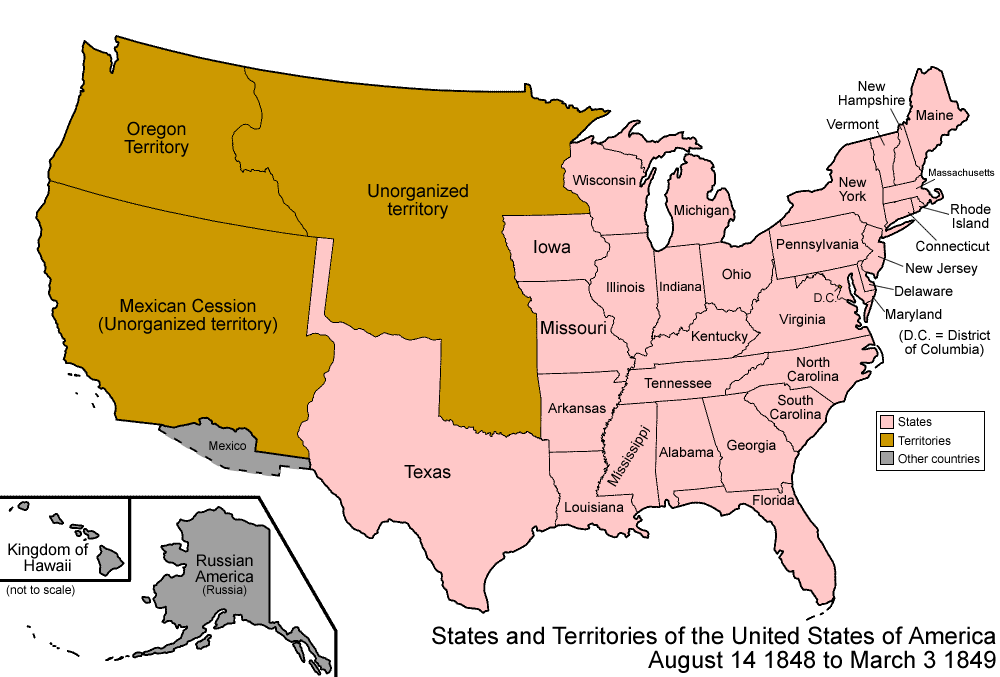
An enlargeable map of the United States after the creation of the Territory of Oregon on August 14, 1848.

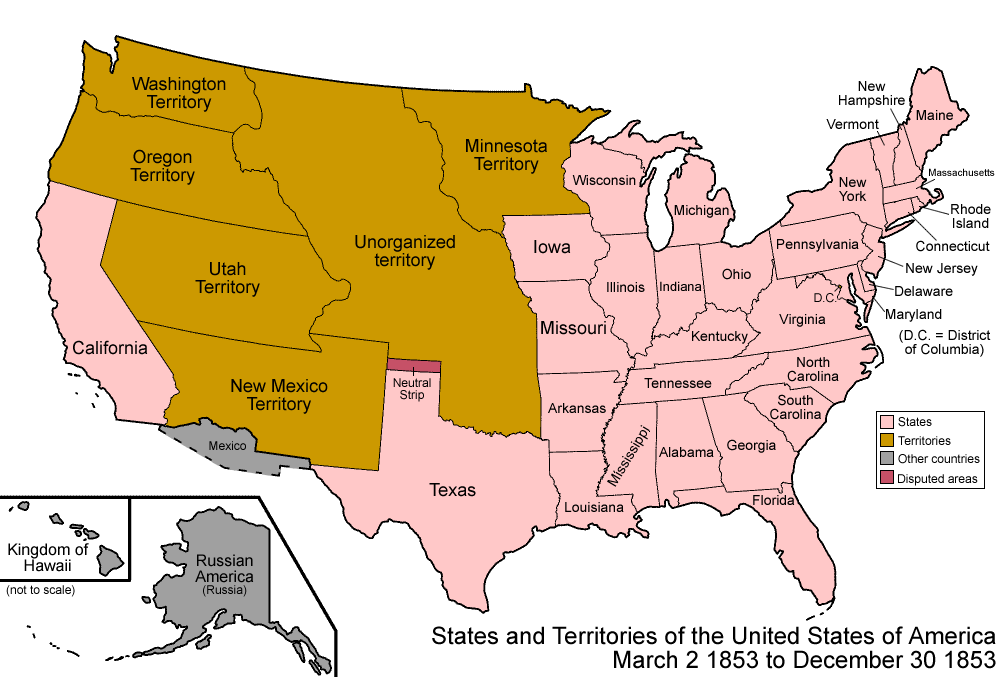
An enlargeable map of the United States after the creation of the Territory of Washington on March 2, 1853.

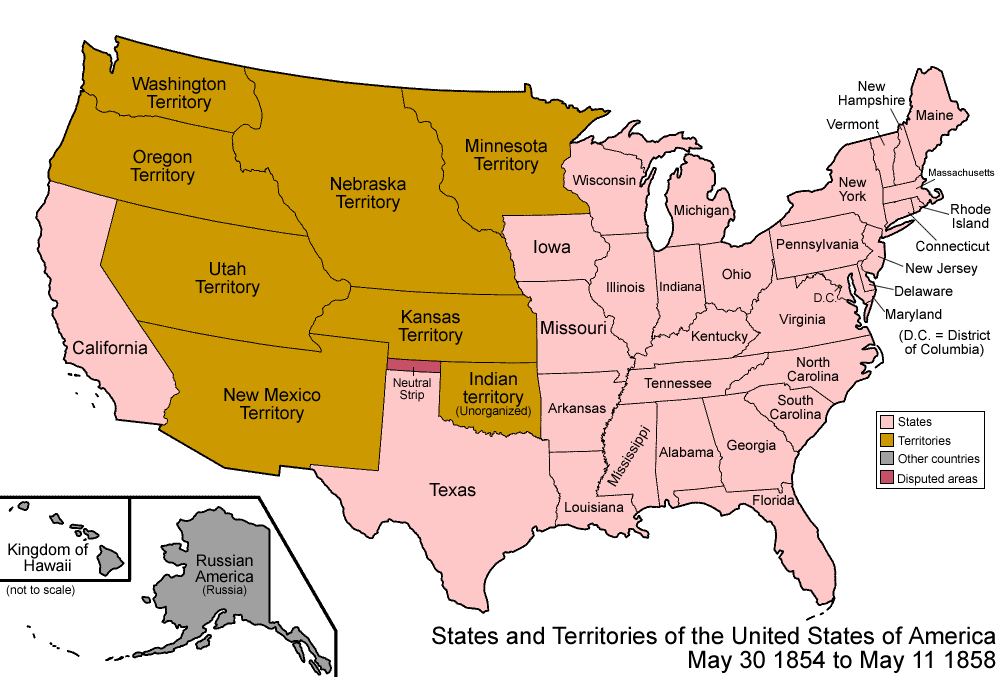
An enlargeable map of the United States after the creation of the Territory of Kansas and the Territory of Nebraska on May 30, 1854.

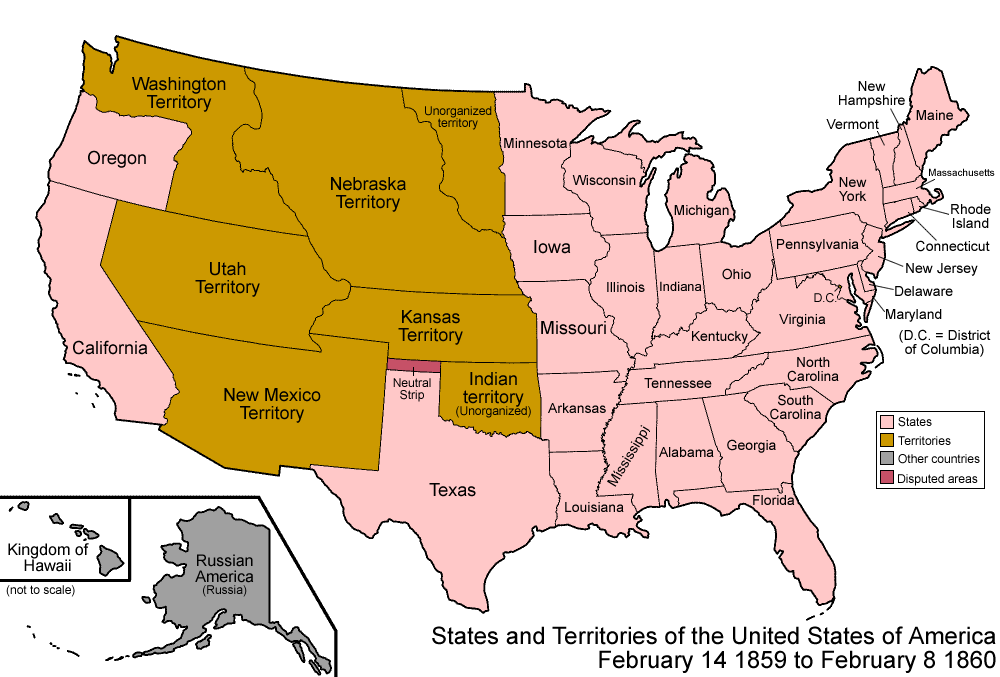
An enlargeable map of the United States after the admission of Oregon to the Union on February 14, 1859.

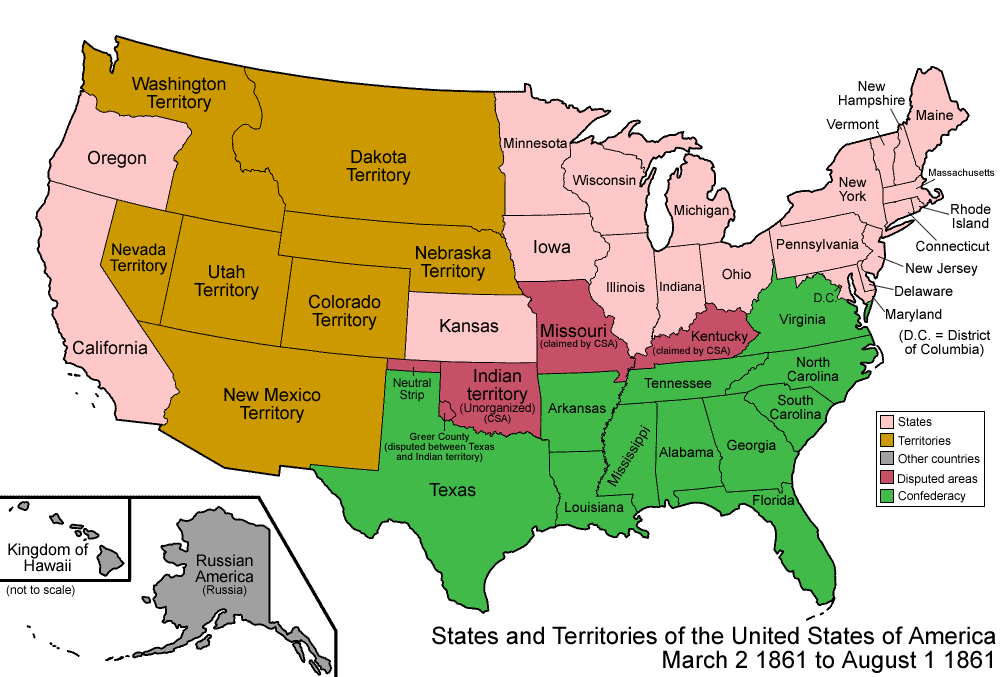
An enlargeable map of the United States after the creation of the Territory of Dakota on March 2, 1861.

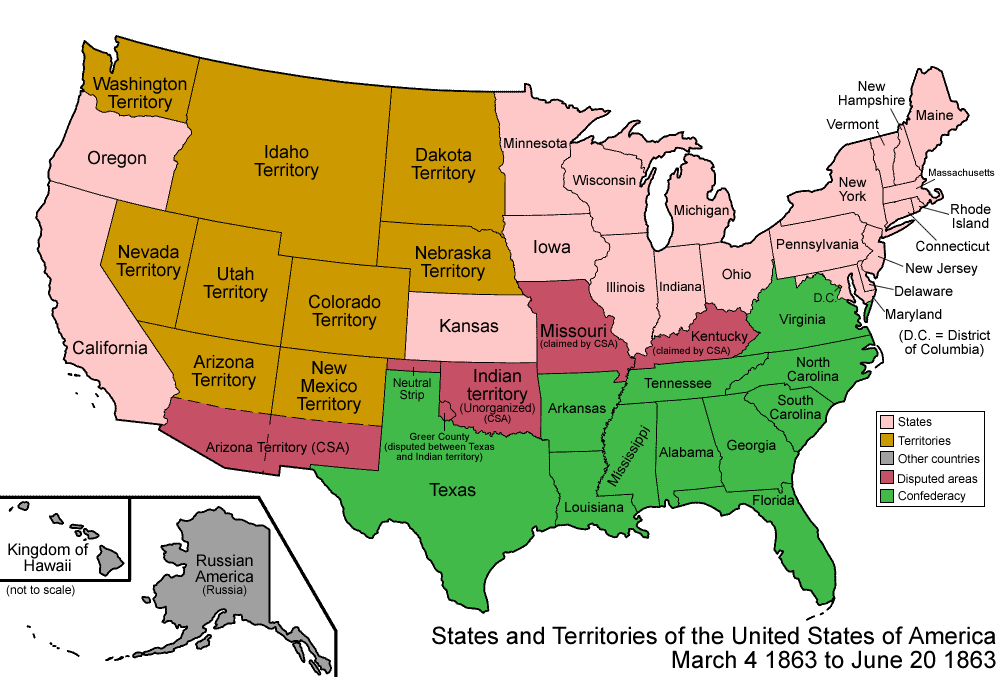
An enlargeable map of the United States after the creation of the Territory of Idaho on March 3, 1863.

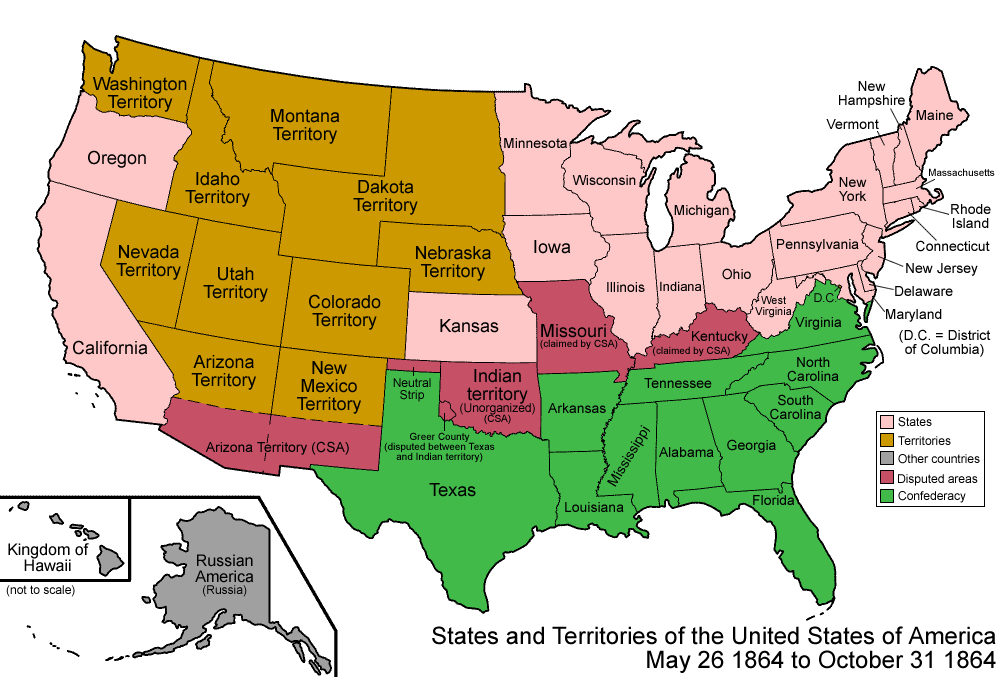
An enlargeable map of the United States after the creation of the Territory of Montana on May 26, 1864.

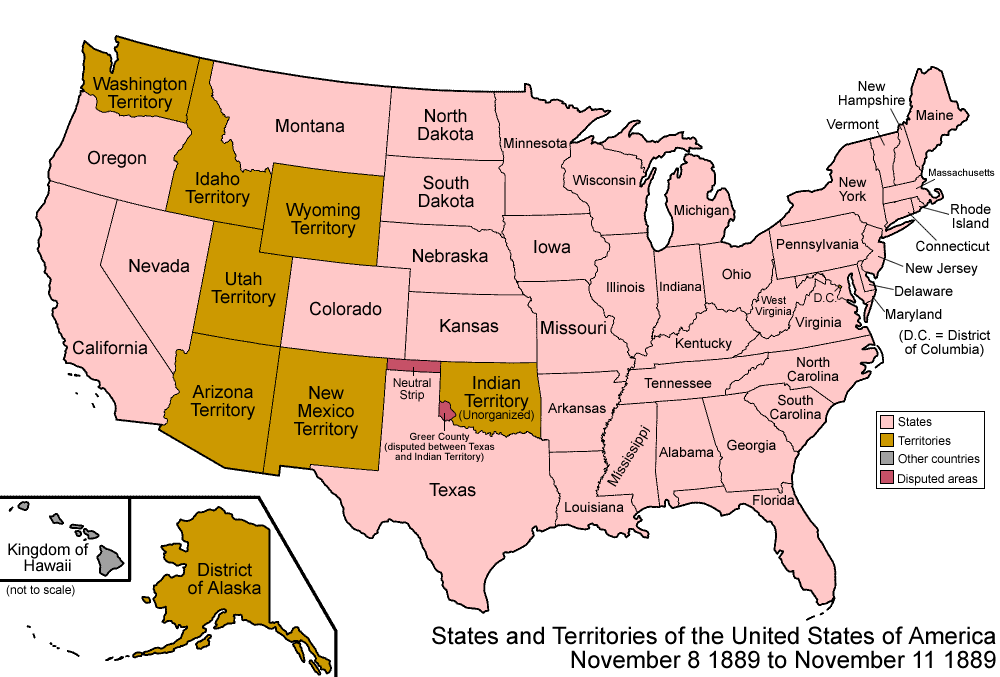
An enlargeable map of the United States after the admission of Montana to the Union on November 8, 1889.

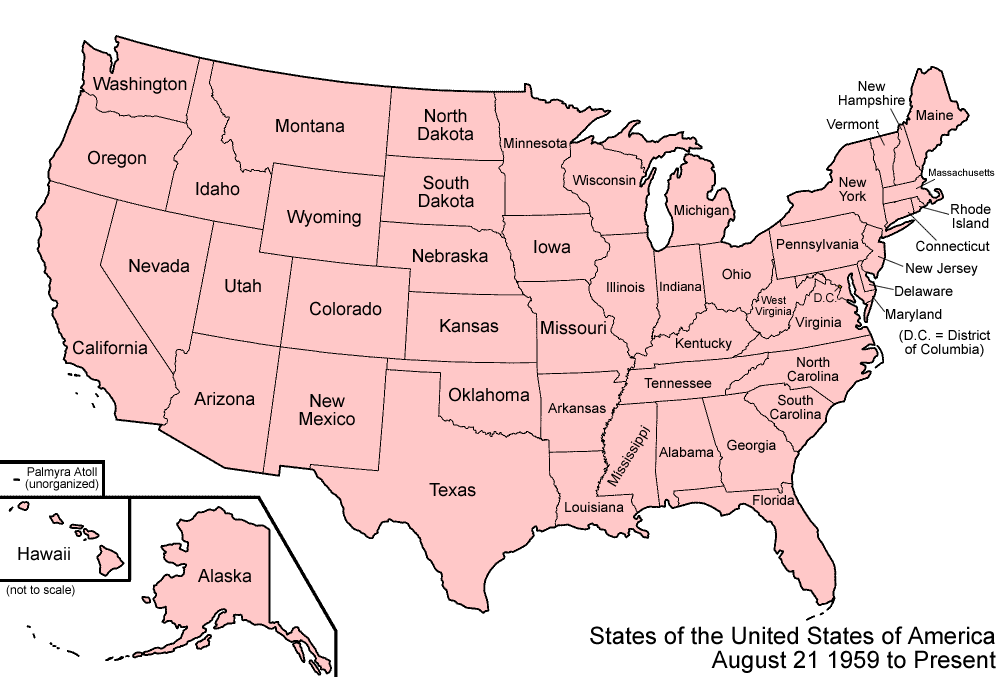
An enlargeable map of the United States as it has been since Hawaiʻi was admitted to the Union on August 21, 1959.

The following chronology traces the territorial evolution of the U.S. State of Montana.

== Timeline ==
- Historical territorial claims of the United Kingdom in the present State of Montana:
  - Rupert's Land, 1670–1870
    - Anglo-American Convention of 1818
- Historical territorial claims of France in the present State of Montana:
  - Louisiane, 1682–1764
    - Treaty of Fontainebleau of 1762
- Historical territorial claims of Spain in the present State of Montana:
  - Luisiana, 1764–1803
    - Third Treaty of San Ildefonso of 1800
- Historical territorial claims of France in the present State of Montana:
  - Louisiane, 1803
    - Vente de la Louisiane of 1803
- Historical international territory in the present State of Montana:
  - Oregon Country, 1818–1846
    - Provisional Government of Oregon (extralegal), 1843–1849
    - Oregon Treaty of 1846
- Historical political divisions of the United States in the present State of Montana:
  - Unorganized territory created by the Louisiana Purchase, 1803–1804
  - District of Louisiana, 1804–1805
  - Territory of Louisiana, 1805–1812
  - Territory of Missouri, 1812–1821
  - Unorganized territory previously the northwestern portion of the Missouri Territory, 1821–1854
  - Unorganized territory created by the Oregon Treaty, 1846–1848
  - Territory of Oregon, 1848–1859
  - Territory of Nebraska, 1854–1867
  - Territory of Washington, 1853–1889
  - Territory of Dakota, 1861–1889
  - Territory of Idaho, 1863–1890
  - Territory of Montana, 1864-1889
  - State of Montana since November 8, 1889

== See also ==
- History of Montana
  - Bibliography of Montana history
  - Historical outline of Montana
  - List of people in Montana history
  - Montana in the American Civil War
  - State of Montana
  - Territory of Montana
  - Timeline of Montana history
    - Timeline of pre-statehood Montana history
    - Timeline of Billings, Montana
