= Third Treaty of San Ildefonso =

1800 treaty between Spain and France

Preliminary and Secret Treaty between the French Republic and His Catholic Majesty the King of Spain, Concerning the Aggrandizement of His Royal Highness the Infant Duke of Parma in Italy and the Retrocession of Louisiana.
- North America; Louisiana-New Spain in purple
- Context: Spain agrees to exchange Louisiana with France for territories in Italy
- Signed: 1 October 1800
- Location: Real Sitio de San Ildefonso
- Negotiators: Mariano Luis de Urquijo; Louis-Alexandre Berthier
- Parties: First French Republic; Kingdom of Spain

Full text
- Treaty of San Ildefonso at Wikisource

The Third Treaty of San Ildefonso was a secret agreement signed on 1 October 1800 between Spain and the French Republic by which Spain agreed in principle to exchange its North American colony of Louisiana for territories in Tuscany. The terms were later confirmed by the March 1801 Treaty of Aranjuez.

== Background ==
For much of the 18th century, France and Spain were allies, but after the execution of Louis XVI in 1793, Spain joined the War of the First Coalition against the French Republic but was defeated in the War of the Pyrenees. In August 1795, Spain and France agreed to the Peace of Basel, with Spain ceding its half of the island of Hispaniola, approximating the modern Dominican Republic.

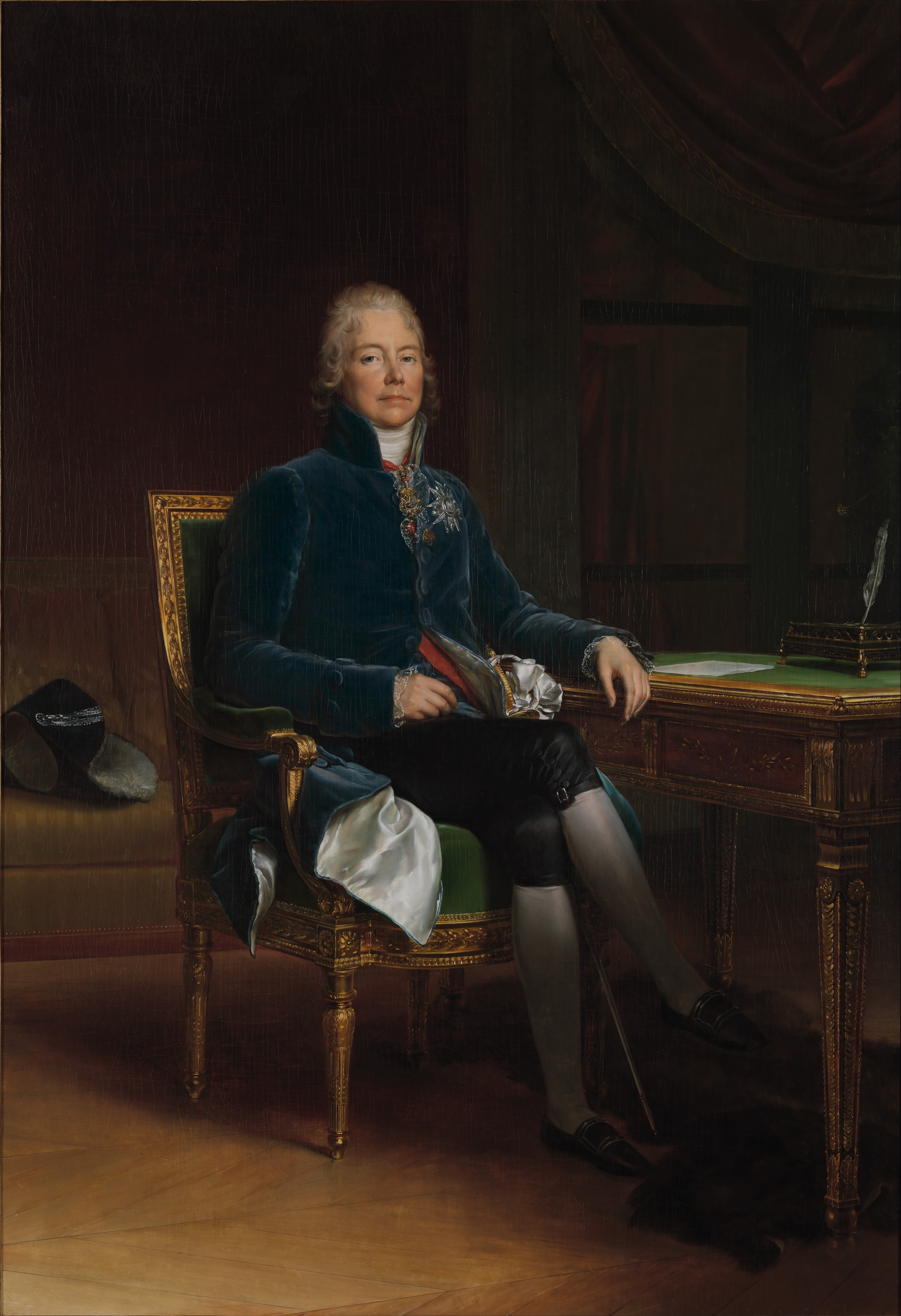
Charles Talleyrand, long-serving French Foreign Minister; the Treaty was part of a complex web of related agreements

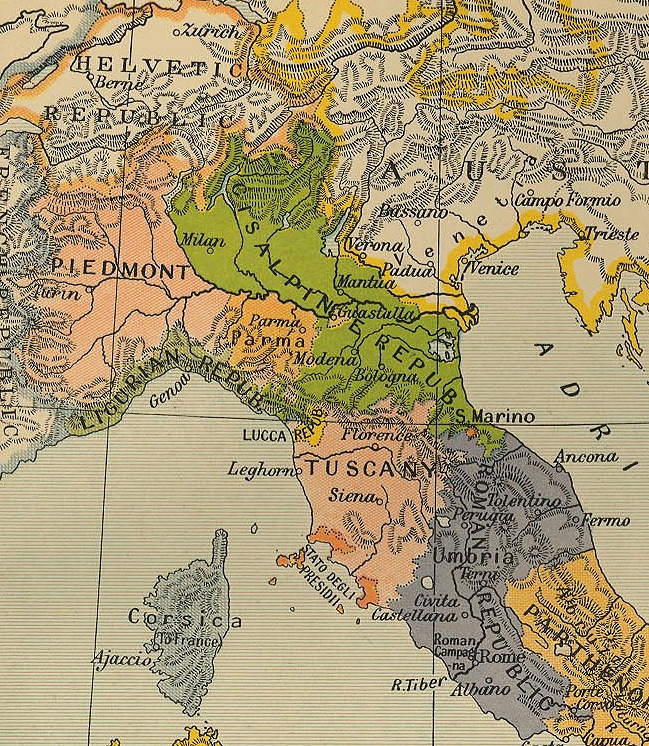
Northern Italy in 1799

In the 1796 Second Treaty of San Ildefonso, Spain allied with France in the War of the Second Coalition and declared war on Britain. This resulted in the loss of Trinidad and, more seriously, Menorca, which Britain occupied from 1708 to 1782 and whose recovery was the major achievement of Spain's participation in the 1778–1783 Anglo-French War. Its loss damaged the prestige of the Spanish government, while the British naval blockade severely affected the economy, which was highly dependent on trade with its colonies in the Americas, particularly the import of silver from New Spain.

The effect was to place the Spanish government under severe political and financial pressure, the national debt increasing eightfold between 1793 and 1798. Louisiana was only part of Spain's immense empire in the Americas, which it received as a result of the 1763 Treaty of Paris, when France ceded it as compensation for Spanish concessions to Britain elsewhere. Preventing encroachment by American settlers into the Mississippi Basin was costly and risked conflict with the U.S., whose merchant ships Spain relied on to evade the British blockade.

Colonies were viewed as valuable assets; the loss of the sugar-producing colonies of Haiti (Saint-Domingue), Martinique, and Guadeloupe between 1791 and 1794 had a huge impact on French business. Restoring them was a priority, and when Napoleon seized power in the November 1799 Coup of 18 Brumaire, he and his deputy Charles Talleyrand stressed the need for French expansion overseas.

Their strategy had a number of parts, one being the 1798–1801 Egyptian campaign, intended in part to strengthen French trading interests in the region. In South America, Talleyrand sought to move the border between French Guiana and Portuguese Brazil south to the Araguari or Amapá River, taking in large parts of Northern Brazil. Terms were contained in the draft 1797 Treaty of Paris which was never approved although similar conditions were imposed on Portugal in the 1801 Treaty of Madrid. A third was the restoration of New France in North America, lost after the 1756–1763 Seven Years' War, with Louisiana providing raw materials for French plantations in the Caribbean.

The combination of French ambition and Spanish weakness made the return of Louisiana attractive to both, especially as Spain was being drawn into disputes with the U.S. over navigation rights on the Mississippi River. Talleyrand claimed French possession of Louisiana would allow them to protect Spanish South America from both Britain and the U.S. (Note: Letter to Urquijo; ...the power of America is bounded by the limit which it may suit the interests and the tranquillity of France and Spain to assign here. The French Republic... will be the wall of brass forever impenetrable to the combined efforts of England and America.)

== Provisions ==
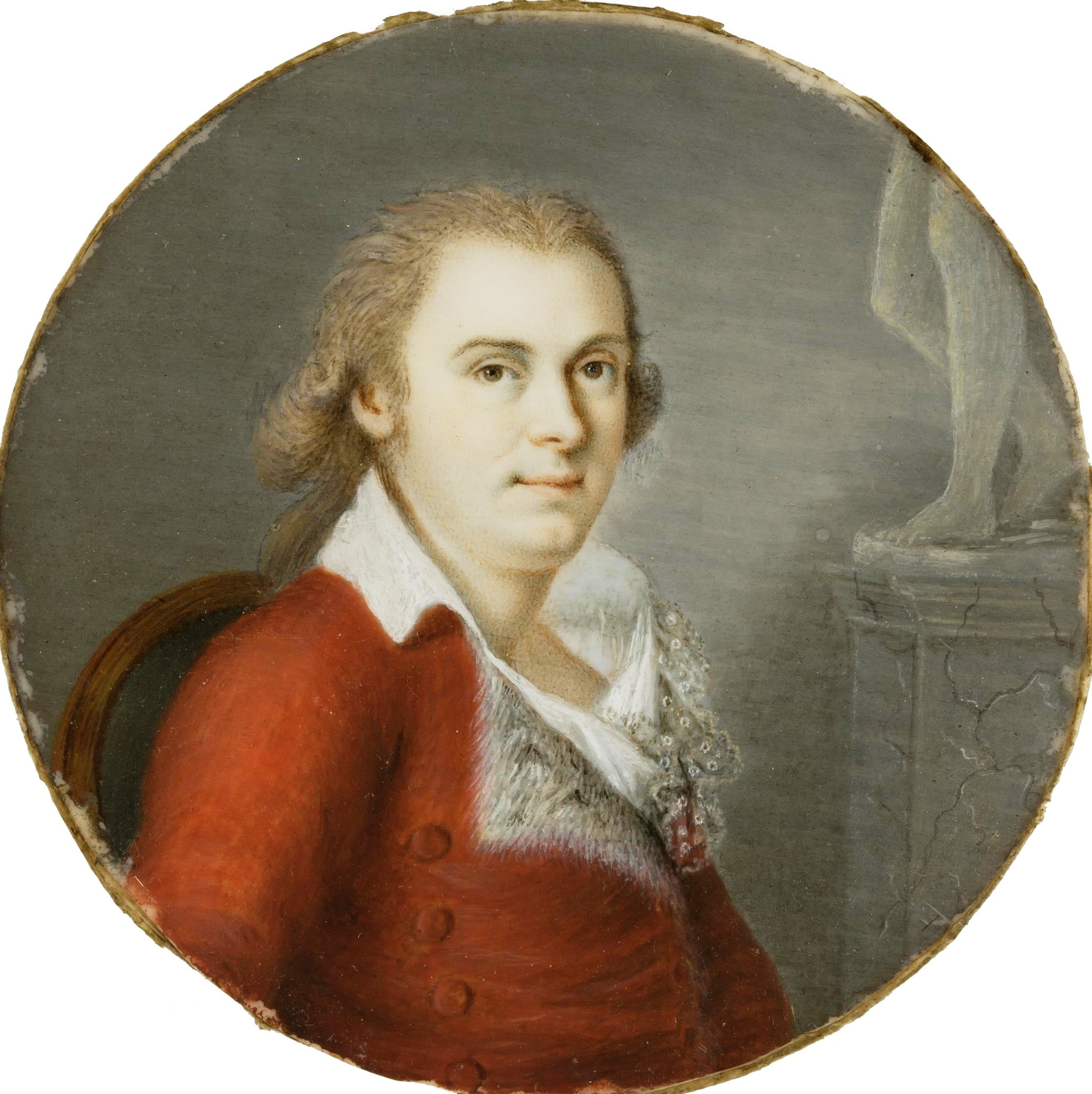
Mariano Luis de Urquijo, Spanish signatory

The Treaty was negotiated by French general Louis-Alexandre Berthier and the Spanish former Chief Minister Mariano Luis de Urquijo. In addition to Louisiana, Berthier was instructed to demand the Spanish colonies of East Florida and West Florida, plus ten Spanish warships.

Urquijo rejected the request for the Floridas but agreed to Louisiana plus "...six ships of war in good condition built for seventy-four guns, armed and equipped and ready to receive French crews and supplies." The six ships of the line supplied to the French were San Antonio, Intrepido, San Genaro, Atlante, Conquistador and Infante Don Pelayo; San Genaro and Atlante were older ships, but the other four were modern ships of the San Ildefonso class. In return, Charles IV wanted compensation for his son-in-law Louis, Duke of Parma, since France wanted to annex his inheritance of the Duchy of Parma.

Geographical details were vague, Clause II of the Treaty simply stating "it may consist of Tuscany...or the three Roman legations or of any other continental provinces of Italy which form a rounded state." Urquijo insisted Spain would hand over Louisiana and the ships only once France confirmed which Italian territories it would receive in return. Finally, the terms reaffirmed the alliance between France and Spain agreed upon in the 1796 Second Treaty of San Ildefonso.

== Aftermath ==
On 9 February 1801, France and Francis II, Holy Roman Emperor signed the Treaty of Lunéville, clearing the way for the Treaty of Aranjuez in March 1801. This confirmed the preliminary terms agreed at Ildefonso and created the short-lived Kingdom of Etruria for Maria Luisa's son-in-law Louis. Spain's Chief Minister Manuel Godoy was excoriated for the terms, which were seen as excessively benefiting France; he later justified it at length in his Memoirs. Modern historians are less critical, since Spain exercised effective control only over a small part of the territory included in the 1803 Louisiana Purchase while an attempt to control U.S. expansion into Spanish territories by the 1795 Pinckney's Treaty proved ineffective.

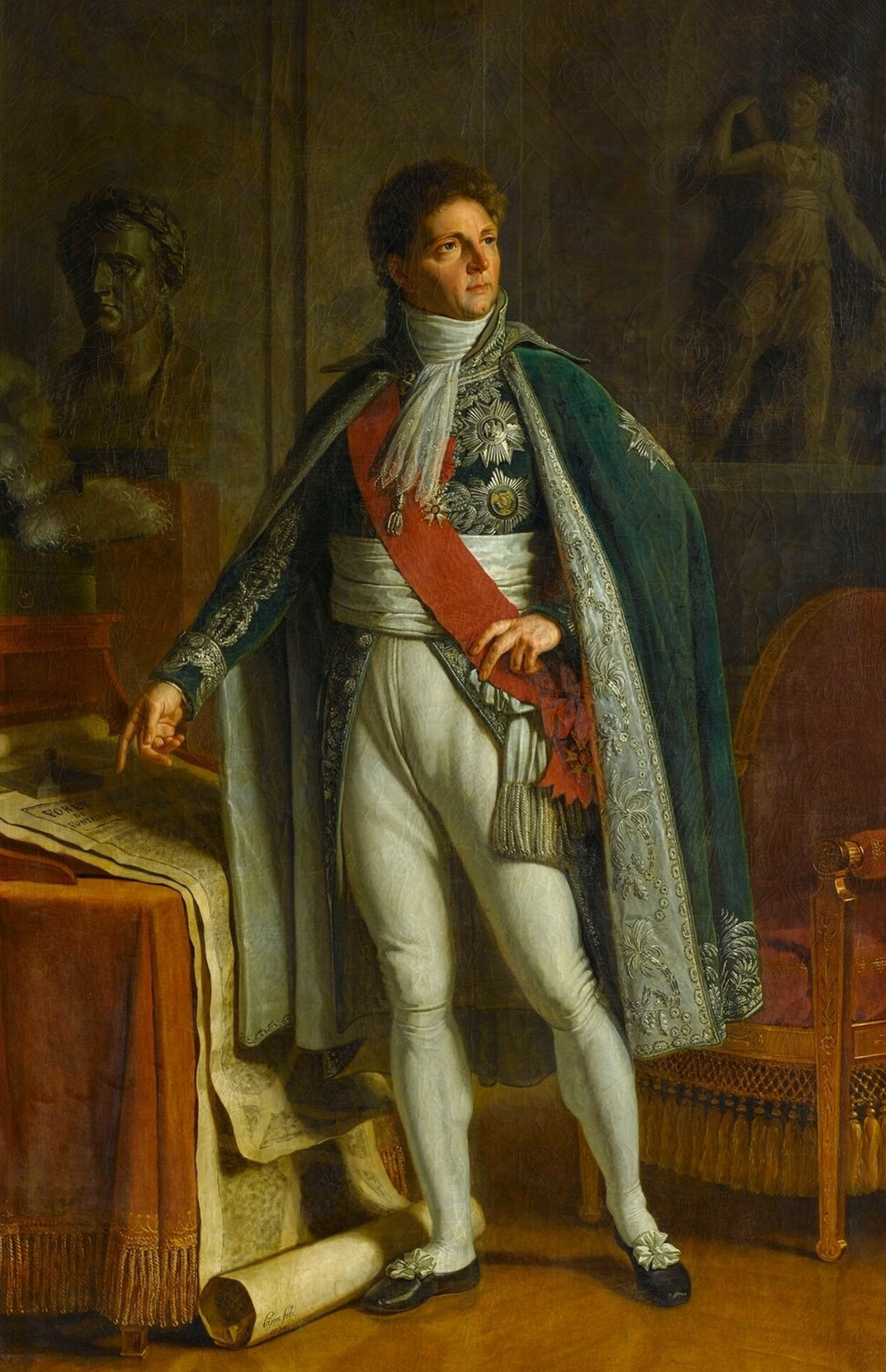
Louis Berthier, French signatory

From 1798 to 1800, France and the U.S. waged an undeclared war at sea, the so-called Quasi-War, which was ended by the Convention of 1800 or Treaty of Mortefontaine. With an already hostile British Canada to the north, the U.S. wanted to avoid an aggressive and powerful France replacing Spain in the south. For commercial reasons, Napoleon wanted to reestablish France's presence in North America, the December 1801 Saint-Domingue expedition being the first step. The March 1802 Treaty of Amiens ended the War of the Second Coalition and in October, Spain transferred Louisiana to France.

While the presence of 30,000 French troops and sailors in the Caribbean initially caused great concern in the U.S., by October 1802 it was clear the expedition was a catastrophic failure; its leader, General Charles Leclerc died of yellow fever, along with an estimated 29,000 men by mid-summer. Without Saint-Domingue, Napoleon concluded Louisiana was irrelevant, and with France and Britain once again on the verge of hostilities, he decided to sell the territory to prevent it from being annexed by British forces garrisoned in nearby Canada. In April 1803, the U.S. purchased the territory for $15 million, or 80 million francs.

The elaborate shuffling of Italian territories was ultimately futile. Etruria was dissolved and incorporated into France in 1807, while much of pre-Napoleonic Italy was restored by the Congress of Vienna in 1815, with Maria Luisa receiving the Duchy of Lucca.

== Sources ==
- Calvo, Carlos (1862). Real cédula expedida en Barcelona, a 15 de octubre de 1802, para que se entregue a la Francia la colonia y provincia de la Luisiana. Coleccion histórica completa de los tratdos, convenciones, capitulaciones, armistricios, y otros actos diplomáticos de todos los estados: de la America Latina comprendidos entre el golfo de Méjico y el cabo de Hornos, desde el año de 1493 hasta nuestros dias, Volume 4 (in Spanish). Denne Schmitz.
- Canga Argüelles, José (1826). Diccionario de hacienda (in Spanish). Impr. española de M. Calero.
- Esdaile, Charles (2003). The Peninsular War: A New History. Palgrave Macmillan. ISBN 978-1-4039-6231-7.
- Godoy, Manuel (1836). Memoirs of Don Manuel De Godoy: Prince of the Peace, Duke Del Alcudia, Count D'everamonte Volume 2 (2012 ed.). Nabu. ISBN 1279296461.
- Hecht, Susanna (2013). The Scramble for the Amazon and the Lost Paradise of Euclides da Cunha. University of Chicago. ISBN 978-0226322810.
- Kemp, Roger, ed. (2010). Documents of American Democracy. McFarland & Co. ISBN 978-0786442102.
- King, Rufus. "Madison Papers; To James Madison from Rufus King, 29 March 1801". Founders Archives. Original source: The Papers of James Madison, Secretary of State Series, vol. 1, 4 March–31 July 1801.
- Kohn, George; Scully, Mary-Louise, eds. (2007). Encyclopedia of Plague and Pestilence: From Ancient Times to the Present. Facts on File. ISBN 978-0816069354.
- Maltby, William (2008). The Rise and Fall of the Spanish Empire. Palgrave. ISBN 978-1403917928.
- McLynn, Frank (1997). Napoleon; a biography. Jonathan Cape. ISBN 978-0224040723.
- Rodriguez, Junius P (2002). The Louisiana Purchase: A Historical and Geographical Encyclopedia. ABC CLIO. ISBN 978-1576071885.
- Sánchez, Rafael Torres (2015). Constructing a Fiscal Military State in Eighteenth Century Spain. Palgrave Macmillan. ISBN 978-1137478658.
- Stearns, Peter N.; Langer, William Leonard (2001). The Encyclopedia of world history: ancient, medieval, and modern. Houghton Mifflin Harcourt. ISBN 0-395-65237-5.
- Tarver, Micheal; Slape, Emily (2016). The Spanish Empire; An Historical Encyclopedia. ABC-CLIO. ISBN 978-1610694216.
- Yale Law School. "Preliminary and Secret Treaty between the French Republic and His Catholic Majesty the King of Spain, Concerning the Aggrandizement of His Royal Highness the Infant Duke of Parma in Italy and the Retrocession of Louisiana". Yale Law School; Avalon Project Documents in Law, History and Diplomacy.
