= Christiansen =

Christiansen (Danish pronunciation: [kʰʁeˈstjænˀsn̩, kʰʁæˈ-]) is a Danish and Norwegian patronymic surname, literally meaning son of Christian. The spelling variant Kristiansen has identical pronunciation. Christiansen is the sixteenth most common name in Denmark, but is shared by less than 1% of the population.

The numbers of bearers of the surnames Christiansen and Kristiansen in Denmark and Norway (2007):

	Christiansen	Kristiansen	source
Denmark	39112	14248	Statistics Denmark
Norway	3922	24533	Statistics Norway

Immigrants to English-speaking countries sometimes have changed the spelling to Christianson or Kristianson.

== Notable people with the surname Christiansen ==
=== A ===
- Alex Christiansen (1925–2010), Norwegian architect
- Anders Christiansen (born 1990), Danish footballer
- Anders Baasmo Christiansen (born 1976), Norwegian actor
- Annika Christiansen (born 1994), Faroese footballer
- Arne Christiansen (1926–2012), Norwegian judge
- Arthur Christiansen (1904–1963), English journalist
- Asger Lund Christiansen (1927–1998), Danish cellist
- Avis Christiansen (1895–1985), American lyricist

=== B ===
- Bill Christiansen (1914–2000), American politician
- Bob Christiansen (born 1949), American football player
- Brush Christiansen, Canadian ice hockey coach
- B. S. Christiansen (born 1952), Danish soldier

=== C ===
- Cam Christiansen, Canadian animator
- Carina Rosenvinge Christiansen (born 1991), Dutch archer
- Carl Christiansen (1886–1970), Norwegian official
- Carl Christiansen (rower) (1909–1990), Norwegian rower
- Carl Emil Christiansen (1937–2018), Danish footballer
- Christian Christiansen (disambiguation), multiple people
- Claus Christiansen (disambiguation), multiple people
- Clay Christiansen (born 1958), American baseball player
- Clay Christiansen (organist) (born 1949), American organist
- Cole Christiansen (born 1997), American football player

=== D ===
- Dick Christiansen (born 1931), Canadian football player
- Ditlef Hvistendahl Christiansen (1865–1944), Norwegian judge
- Dorte Christiansen, Danish cricketer

=== E ===
- Eigil Christiansen (1894–1943), Norwegian sailor
- Einar Christiansen (1861–1939), Danish journalist
- Ellen Christine Christiansen (born 1964), Norwegian politician
- ElRay L. Christiansen (1897–1975), American religious figure
- Else Marie Christiansen (1921–2017), Norwegian speed skater
- Eric Christiansen (1937–2016), English historian
- Erik Christiansen (born 1956), Danish rower

=== F ===
- F. Melius Christiansen (1871–1955), Norwegian violinist
- Friedrich Christiansen (1879–1972), German commander
- Fritz Christiansen (1889–1955), Danish wrestler

=== G ===
- Glen Christiansen (born 1957), Swedish swimmer
- Godtfred Kirk Christiansen (1920–1995), Danish businessman
- Gottlieb Bender Christiansen (1851–1929), American minister

=== H ===
- Hans Christiansen (sailor) (1867–1938), Norwegian sailor
- Hans Christiansen (artist) (1866–1945), German painter
- Henning Christiansen (1932–2008), Danish composer
- Henrik Christiansen (disambiguation), multiple people
- Hugo Christiansen (born 1940), Danish rower

=== I ===
- Ingeborg Christiansen (born 1930), German actress
- Izzy Christiansen (born 1991), English footballer

=== J ===
- Jack Christiansen (1928–1986), American football player and coach
- Jackie Christiansen (born 1977), Danish Paralympic athlete
- Jake Christiansen, multiple people
- Jan Christiansen (born 1941), Norwegian footballer
- Jan Fredrik Christiansen (born 1942), Norwegian trumpeter
- Jason Christiansen (born 1969), American baseball player
- Jen Christiansen, American author
- Jesper Christiansen (disambiguation), multiple people
- Jessie Christiansen, Australian astrophysicist
- Johannes Christiansen (1850–1913), Norwegian politician
- Johan-Sebastian Christiansen (born 1998), Norwegian chess player
- John Christiansen (1923–1998), American test pilot
- Julie Christiansen (born 1968), Norwegian politician

=== K ===
- Kaj Christiansen (1921–2008), Danish footballer and coach
- Kåre Christiansen (1911–1984), Norwegian bobsledder
- Karianne Christiansen (1949–1976), Norwegian skier
- Keith Christiansen (ice hockey) (1944–2018), American ice hockey player
- Keith Christiansen (art historian) (born 1947), American art historian
- Kenneth Christiansen (disambiguation), multiple people
- Kerry Ann Christiansen, British actress
- Kristian Albert Christiansen (1888–1966), Norwegian politician

=== L ===
- Larry Christiansen (born 1956), American chess grandmaster
- Lars Christiansen (handballer) (born 1972), Danish handball player
- Lauritz Christiansen, Norwegian sailor
- Lisa Christiansen, Canadian radio personality
- Lorang Christiansen (1917–1991), Norwegian cyclist

=== M ===
- Mads Christiansen (born 1986), Dutch handball player
- Mads Hedenstad Christiansen (born 2000), Norwegian footballer
- Majken Christiansen (born 1967), Danish vocalist
- Margrethe Christiansen (1895–1971), Danish teacher
- Marianne Christiansen (born 1963), Danish bishop
- Mark Christiansen, Dutch badminton player
- Marty Christiansen (1916–1999), American football player
- Mathias Christiansen (born 1994), Danish badminton player
- Max Christiansen (born 1996), German footballer
- Michael Christiansen (1926/1927–1984), British newspaper editor
- Michele Christiansen (born 1970), American judge
- Mogens Christiansen (born 1972), Danish cricketer
- Morten Christiansen, multiple people

=== N ===
- Nanna Christiansen (born 1989), Dutch footballer
- Niels Christiansen (born 1966), Danish businessman
- Nils Christiansen (1913–1988), Filipino swimmer
- Nina Christiansen (born 1964), Danish runner

=== O ===
- Olaf Christiansen (1901–1984), American composer
- Ole Kirk Christiansen (1891–1958), Danish carpenter and entrepreneur
- Ove Christiansen (born 1969), Danish professor

=== P ===
- Pål H. Christiansen (born 1958), Norwegian novelist
- Palle Christiansen (born 1973), Greenlandic politician
- Peter Christiansen (disambiguation), multiple people
- Poul Simon Christiansen (1855–1933), Danish painter
- Preben Christiansen (1913–1979), Danish fencer

=== R ===
- Ragnar Christiansen (1922–2019), Norwegian politician
- Rasmus Christiansen (disambiguation), multiple people
- Reggie Christiansen (born 1975), American baseball coach
- Reidar Thoralf Christiansen (1886–1971), Norwegian folklorist
- Richard Christiansen (disambiguation), multiple people
- Rob Christiansen, American musician
- Robin Christiansen (born 1950), American politician
- Roger Christiansen (born 1952), American television director
- Rune Christiansen (born 1963), Norwegian poet and novelist
- Rupert Christiansen (born 1954), English writer

=== S ===
- Sabine Christiansen (born 1957), German journalist
- Sigurd Christiansen (1891–1947), Norwegian novelist
- Sophie Christiansen (born 1987), British equestrian
- Steve Christiansen (born 1956), American rower
- Steve Christiansen (born 1961), American politician
- Svein Christiansen (1941–2015), Norwegian musician

=== T ===
- Tanya Christiansen, American mathematician
- Thomas Christiansen (born 1973), Spanish footballer
- Thomas Christiansen (diver) (1920–1998), Danish diver
- Thor Nis Christiansen (1957–1981), American criminal
- Thue Christiansen (1940–2022), Greenlandic teacher
- Tom Christiansen (born 1963), American video game developer
- Tom Christiansen (ski jumper) (born 1956), Norwegian ski jumper
- Tony Christiansen (born 1958), New Zealand motivational speaker
- Trine Christiansen, Danish cricketer

=== U ===
- Ursula Reuter Christiansen (born 1943), German filmmaker

=== V ===
- Vetle Sjåstad Christiansen (born 1992), Norwegian biathlete
- Vicki Christiansen (born 1960), American civil servant
- Vidar Christiansen (born 1948), Norwegian economist
- Villy Christiansen (born 1935), Danish canoeist

=== W ===
- Wilbur Norman Christiansen (1913–2007), Australian radio astronomer

== See also ==
- Christiansen effect, a filtering effect
- Christiansen filter, narrow bandpass or monochromatic optical filter
- Cape Christiansen, Greenland
- Christiansen Academy, private boarding school in Rubio, Táchira, Venezuela
- Christensen (surname), people with the given surname "Christensen"
- Christianson, people with the given surname "Christianson"
- Kristiansen, people with the given surname "Kristiansen"
- Kristinsson, people with the given surname "Kristinsson"
