= Christensen =

Christensen may refer to:

- Christensen (surname)
- Christensen (constructor), a former racing car constructor
- 164P/Christensen, a periodic comet
- 170P/Christensen, a periodic comet

== See also ==
- Christiansen
- Christianson
- Kristiansen
