= Kristensson =

Kristensson is a Swedish patronymic surname meaning "son of Kristen". Notable people with the surname include:

- Krister Kristensson (1942–2023), Swedish footballer
- Tom Kristensson (born 1991), Swedish rally driver

== See also ==
- Kristinsson
- Christiansen
- Ulf Kristersson (born 1963), Swedish politician
