= Ken Ivory =

American politician

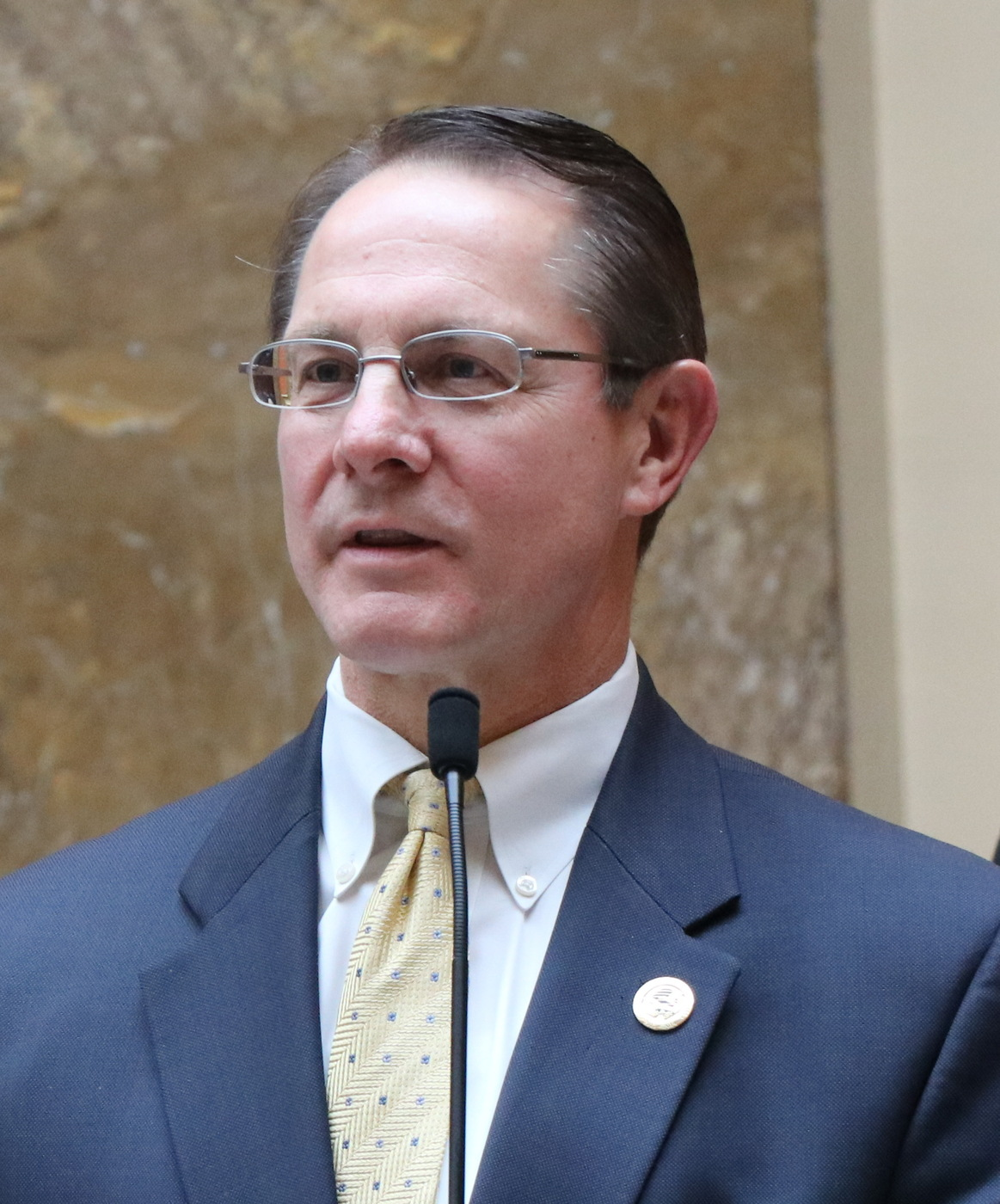

Member of the Utah House of Representatives from the 39th district
- Incumbent
- Assumed office January 1, 2023
- Preceded by: Redistricted
- Succeeded by: Drew Howells (elect)

Member of the Utah House of Representatives from the 47th district
- In office November 2021 – January 1, 2023
- Preceded by: Steve Christiansen
- Succeeded by: Redistricted
- In office January 1, 2011 – August 20, 2019
- Preceded by: Steven Mascaro
- Succeeded by: Steve Christiansen

Personal details
- Party: Republican
- Spouse: Rebecca Ivory
- Website: voteivory.com

Ken Ivory is an American politician and lobbyist serving as a member of the Utah House of Representatives for the 39th district.

== Career ==
Ivory was elected to the Utah House of Representatives in November 2010 and assumed office on January 1, 2011. He left office in August 2019 to take a position with the Utah-based corporation, Geomancer. In November 2021, Ivory was re-appointed to his old seat in the House after Steve Christiansen resigned.

=== Committee assignments ===
During the 2016 legislative session, Ivory served on the Natural Resources, Agriculture, and Environmental Quality Appropriations Subcommittee, the House Public Utilities (which he was the chair), the House Revenue and Taxation Committee, and the House Natural Resources, Agriculture, and Environment Committee. During the interim, Ivory serves on the Revenue and Taxation Interim Committee, and the Public Utilities, Energy, and Technology Interim Committee. He is also a member of the Commission for the Stewardship of Public Lands, Commission on Federalism and the Federal Funds Commission.

=== Transfer of Public Lands Act ===
Representative Ivory is a strong supporter of states' rights and has frequently advocated for Utah to gain control of federal lands. In 2012, Ivory sponsored HB 148, the Utah Transfer of Public Lands Act, which asserted that the federal government must grant federal land to the state of Utah. Though the bill was signed into law in 2012, federal lands have remained in control of the United States Department of the Interior.

Since the federal lands have not been relinquished to Utah, in December 2015 the state legislature has voted to pursue a lawsuit against the federal government.

=== American Lands Council ===
Ivory is the president of Ivory Law and the American Lands Council. ALC is a non-profit organization that promotes measures to assist states assuming control of federal lands within state's boundaries. Ivory and ALC have been the subject of complaints filed with Utah's attorney general, citing Ivory's conflict of interest for writing legislation to benefit ALC while he was a sitting legislator

=== H.B. 374 Sensitive Materials in Schools ===
In the 2022 General Session of Utah Legislature, Rep. Ken Ivory was chief sponsor of a Bill intended to protect public school children from various materials found in books or other instructional materials that may be considered offensive. HB374, sponsored by Rep. Ken Ivory and R-West Jordan, defines “sensitive material” as instructional materials that are pornographic or indecent, colloquially referred to as the “bright line” rule in state code. Shortly after passage of the Bill, a parent of a school-aged child challenged the law, noting that the Holy Bible contained vulgar, sexual and violent content and should, therefore, be likewise removed from public schools. Based on the merits of the challenge, at least one school district has chosen to remove the Bible from their elementary and middle school’s libraries.

== Elections ==
- 2022: Ivory won the race for District 39 in the November 8 general election.
- 2014: Ivory was unopposed for the 2014 Republican Convention and won the November 4, 2014 General election with 4,634 votes (65.8%) against Democratic nominee Alena M. Balmforth.
- 2012: Ivory was unopposed for the June 26, 2012 Republican Primary and won the three-way November 6, 2012 General election with 7,354 votes (62.5%) against Democratic nominee Joseph Huey and Libertarian candidate Chase Lantis.
- 2010: Ivory challenged District 47 incumbent Republican Representative Steven Mascaro and was chosen by the Republican convention for the November 2, 2010 General election; Ivory won with 4,384 votes (61%) against Democratic nominee John Rendell.
