= Lönnberg (disambiguation) =

Lönnberg is a Swedish surname.

Lönnberg may also refer to:

- Lönnberg Valley, in Antarctica

== See also ==
- Löhnberg, a community in Hesse, Germany
- Lönneberga, a village in Småland, Sweden
