= Christianson =

Christianson is a patronymic surname and an anglicized form of the Danish/Norwegian Christiansen. Notable people with the surname include:

- Adolph M. Christianson (1877–1954), American jurist from North Dakota
- Donna Jean Christianson (1931–2015), American politician
- John Christianson (1923–2010), Canadian politician
- Ken Christianson, American musician and composer, brother of Masanori
- Marc and Betty Christianson, American founders of the Dakota Zoo
- Marvin E. Christianson Sr. (1928–1969), American politician
- Masanori Mark Christianson (born 1976), American musician, brother of Ken Chrisanson
- Nels Christianson, American politician
- Oliver Christianson, American cartoonist, greeting card designer, and illustrator
- Stanley R. Christianson (1925–1950), American Marine Corps Medal of Honor recipient
- Theodore Christianson (1883–1948), American politician from Minnesota
- Theodore Christianson (judge) (1913–1955), American jurist from Minnesota
- Wei Christianson (born 1956), American banker
- William C. Christianson (1892–1985), American jurist from Minnesota

== See also ==
- Justice Christianson (disambiguation)
