= Christian Christiansen =

Christian Christiansen may refer to:

- Christian Christiansen (musician) (1884–1955), Danish musician
- Christian Christiansen (physicist) (1843–1917), Danish physicist
- Christian E. Christiansen (born 1972), Danish filmmaker
