= Richard Christiansen =

Richard Christiansen may refer to:

- Richard Christiansen (politician) (1928–2001), American politician, member of the Ohio House of Representatives
- Richard Christiansen (critic) (1931–2022), American theatre critic for the Chicago Tribune
- Dick Christiansen, Canadian football player
