= Lonborg =

Lonborg is a surname. Notable people with the surname include:

- Jim Lonborg (born 1942), former Major League baseball player
- Dutch Lonborg (1898-1985), American college basketball coach

== See also ==
- Lønborg
- Lönnberg
