= Judge Christensen =

Judge Christensen may refer to:

- Albert Sherman Christensen (1905–1996), judge of the United States District Court for the District of Utah
- Dana L. Christensen (born 1951), judge of the United States District Court for the District of Montana
- Ingolf Elster Christensen (1872–1943), Norwegian jurist
- Ione Christensen (born 1933), judge of the juvenile court in Yukon, Canada

== See also ==
- Susan Christensen (born 1962), associate justice of the Iowa Supreme Court
- Justice Christianson (disambiguation)
