= Christian Christiansen (physicist) =

Danish physicist (1843–1917)

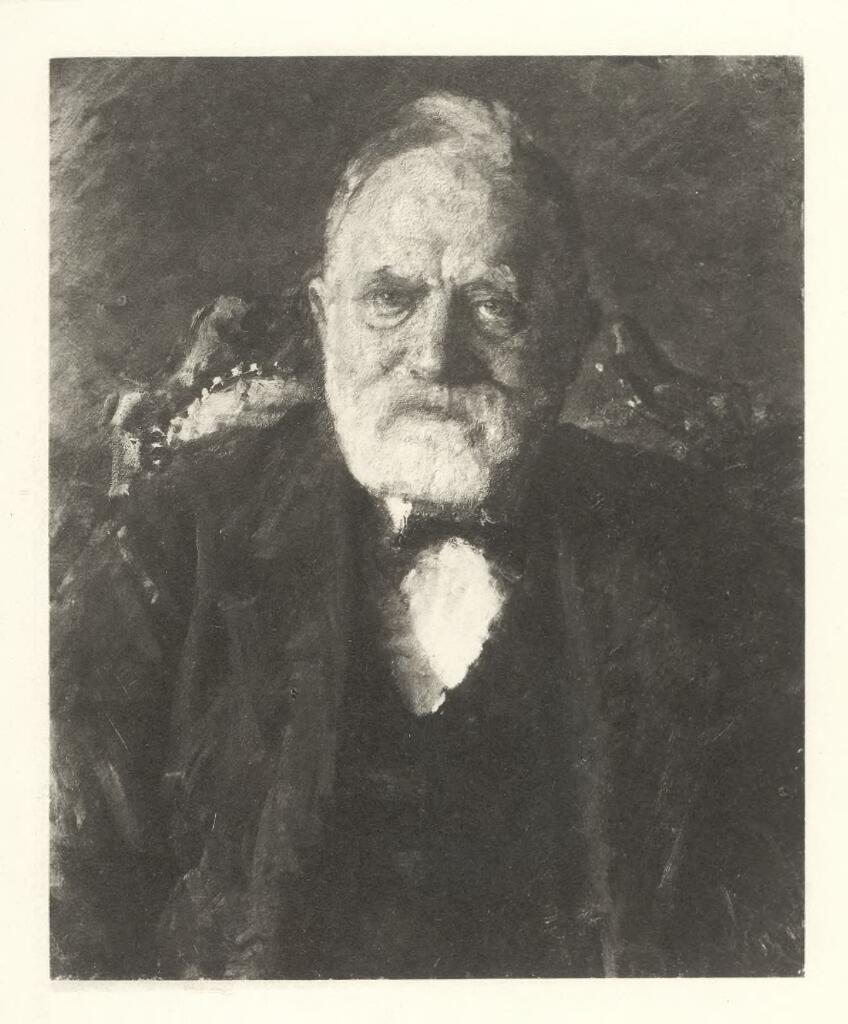
- Born: 9 October 1843; Lønborg, Denmark
- Died: 28 November 1917 (aged 74); Frederiksberg, Denmark
- Years active: 1870s – 1912
- Known for: Christiansen effect
- Scientific career
- Fields: Optics
- Institutions: University of Copenhagen
- Doctoral students: Niels Bohr

Christian Christiansen (9 October 1843– 28 November 1917) was a Danish physicist.

Christiansen first taught at the local polytechnical school. In 1886, he was appointed to a chair for physics at the University of Copenhagen.

He mainly studied radiant heat and optical dispersion, discovering the Christiansen effect and the Christiansen filter. Around 1917, he discovered the anomalous dispersion of numerous dyes, including aniline red (fuchsine), by recording absorption spectra.

In 1884, he confirmed the Stefan–Boltzmann law.

Christiansen was elected a member of the Royal Swedish Academy of Sciences in 1902.

He was doctoral advisor to Niels Bohr. In 1912, he retired and Martin Knudsen became professor.

== Works ==
- Two-volume physics textbook:
  - Christiansen, C. (1892). Lærebog i Fysik : Mekanisk Fysik og Varmelære. Vol. 1. København: P. G. Philipsens Forlag. Google Books HUfPAAAAMAAJ. HathiTrust mdp.39015069734286.
  - Christiansen, C. (1894). Lærebog i Fysik : Electricitet og Lys. Vol. 2. København: P. G. Philipsens Forlag. (Exists in some libraries.)
- Two-volume introduction to mathematical physics:
  - Christiansen, C. (1887). Indledning til den mathematiske Fysik : Potentialet, Mekanisk Fysik. Vol. 1. Kjøbenhavn: I Kommission hos K. Schønberg. HathiTrust mdp.39015069734278.
  - Christiansen, C. (1889). Indledning til den mathematiske Fysik : Varmeledning, Lyslære. Vol. 2. Kjøbenhavn: I Kommission hos K. Schønberg. (Exists in some libraries.)
  - Translation into German: Christiansen, C. (1894). Elemente der theoretischen Physik. Translated by Müller, Joh. Leipzig: Johann Ambrosius Barth (Arthur Meiner). OL 6326752M. Google Books f_UOAAAAYAAJ. HathiTrust 000590882. Internet Archive elementedertheo00mlgoog.
  - Translation of the German into English: Christiansen, C. (1897). Elements of theoretical physics. Translated by Magie, W. F. London & New York: MacMillan. Google Books 4JMAAAAAMAAJ, VP0-AAAAYAAJ. HathiTrust 3502195. Internet Archive elementsoftheore00chriiala.
- Christiansen, C. (1884). "(VII.) Untersuchungen über die optischen Eigenschaften von fein vertheilten Körpern : Erste Mittheilung". Annalen der Physik und Chemie. XXIII. Leipzig: Verlag von Johann Ambrosius Barth: 298–306. Gallica ark:/12148/bpt6k15266v.
- Christiansen, C. (1885). "(IV.) Untersuchungen über die optischen Eigenschaften von fein vertheilten Körpern : Zweite Mittheilung". Annalen der Physik und Chemie. XXIV. Leipzig: Verlag von Johann Ambrosius Barth: 439–446. Gallica ark:/12148/bpt6k152676.
