= Territorial evolution of Utah =

Utah Enabling Act
- Long title: An Act To enable the people of Utah to form a constitution and State government, and to be admitted into the Union on an equal footing with the original States.
- Enacted by: the 53rd United States Congress
- Effective: July 16, 1894

Citations
- Statutes at Large: 28 Stat. 107

Legislative history
- Introduced in the House as H.R. 352 by Joseph L. Rawlins on September 6, 1893; Committee consideration by House Committee on the Territories; Passed the House on December 13, 1893 (Voice vote); Passed the Senate on July 10, 1894 (Voice vote); Signed into law by President Grover Cleveland on July 16, 1894

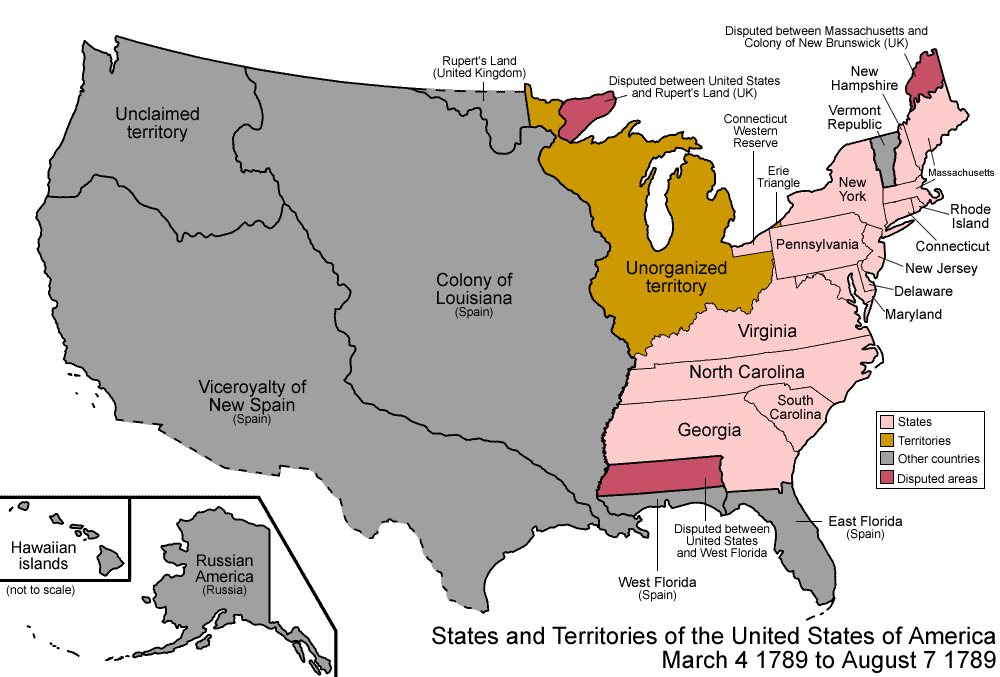
An enlargeable map of the United States after the Constitution of the United States was ratified on March 4, 1789.

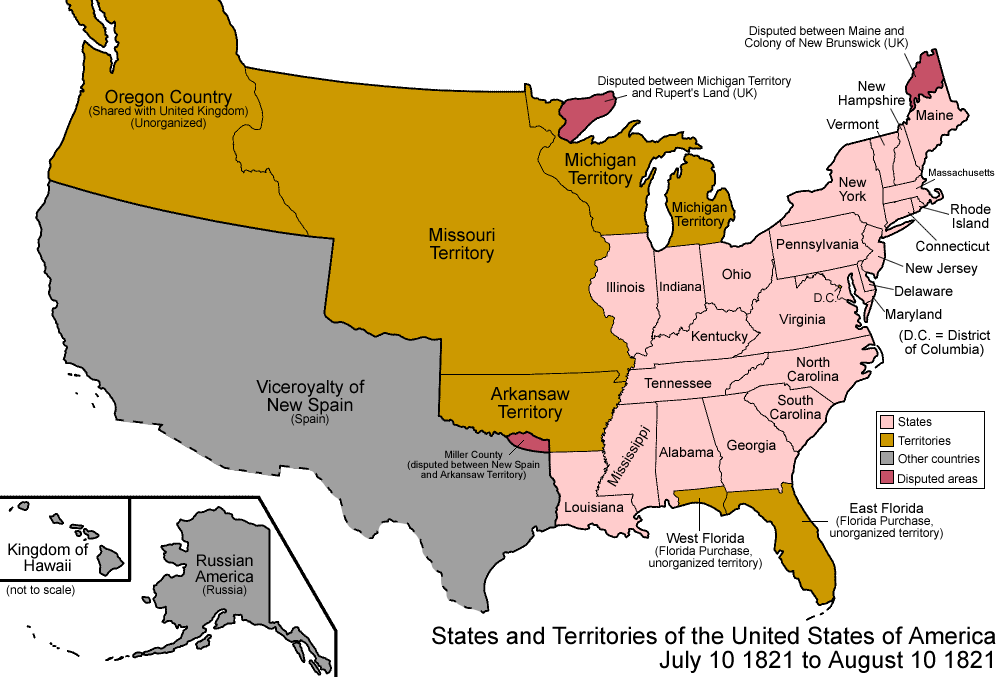
An enlargeable map of the United States after the Treaty of Córdoba was signed on August 24, 1821.

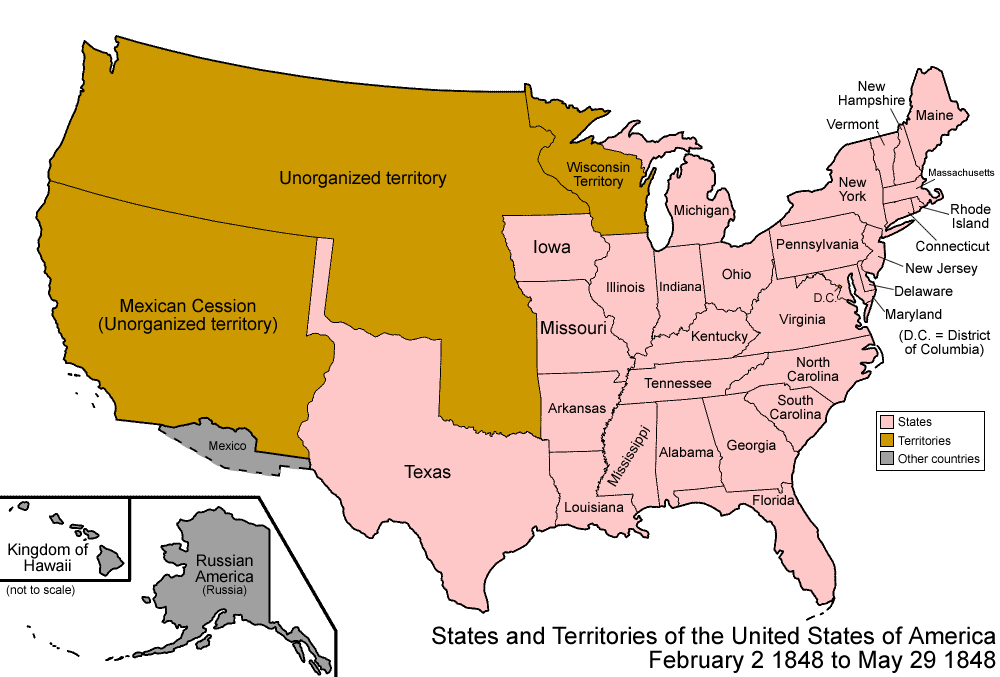
An enlargeable map of the United States after the Treaty of Guadalupe Hidalgo was signed on February 2, 1848.

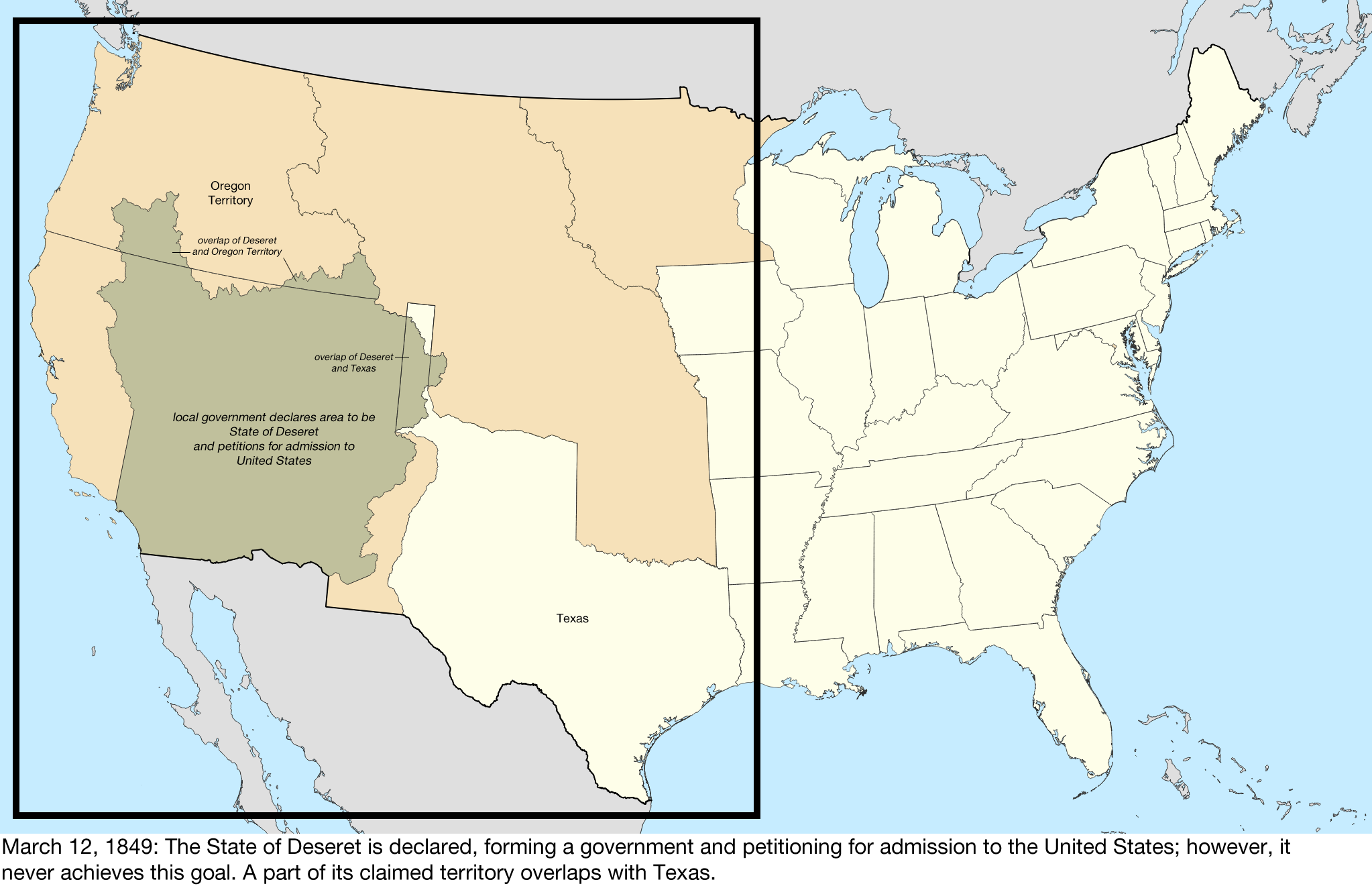
An enlargeable map of the United States after the creation of the proposed State of Deseret on July 2, 1849.

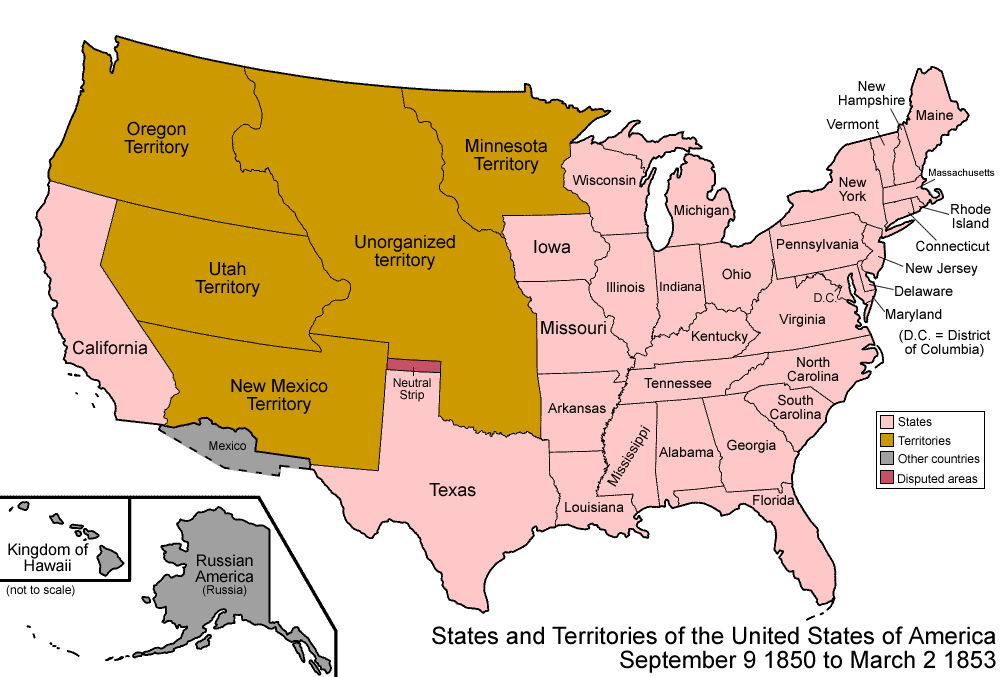
An enlargeable map of the United States after the creation of the Territory of New Mexico and the Territory of Utah on September 9, 1850.

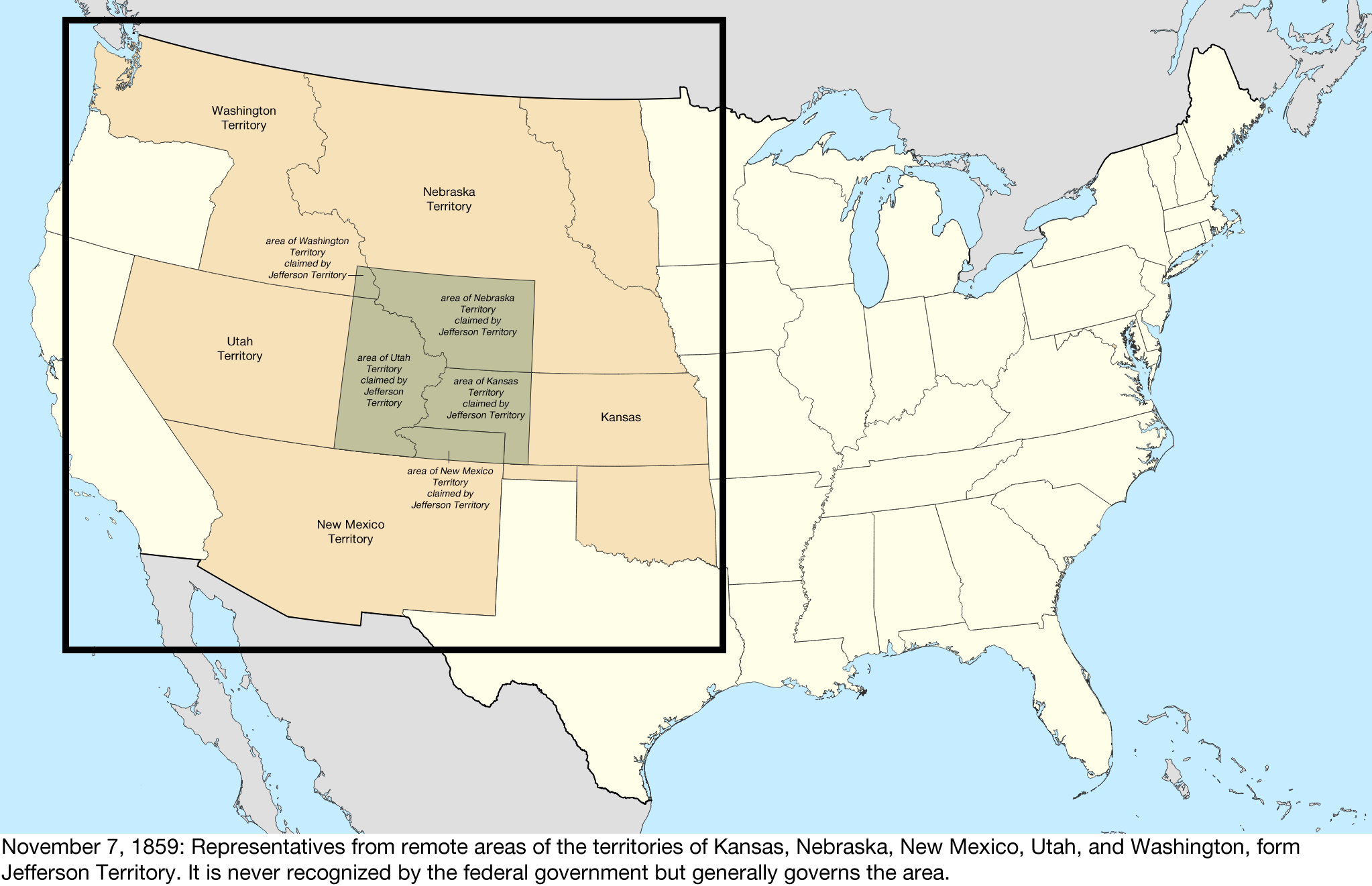
An enlargeable map of the United States after the creation of the proposed Territory of Jefferson on October 24, 1859.

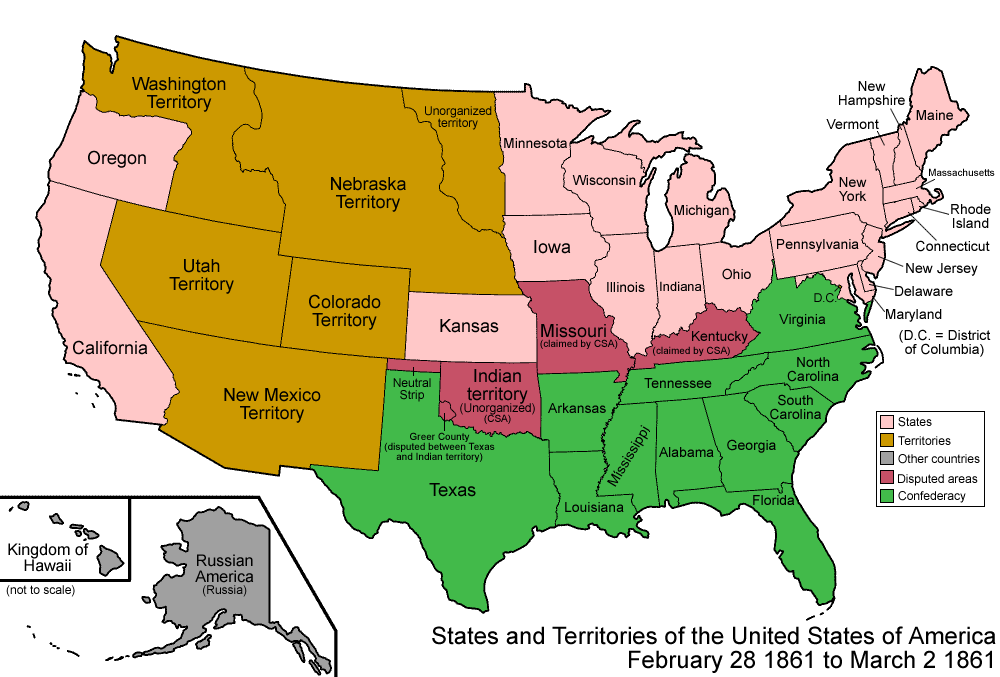
An enlargeable map of the United States after the creation of the Territory of Colorado on February 28, 1861.

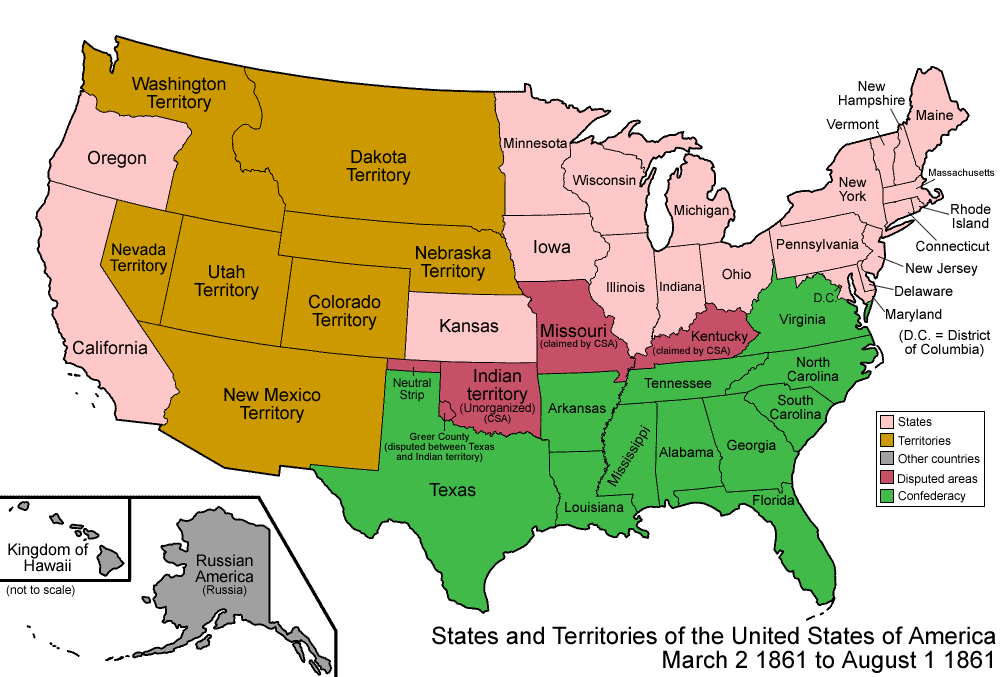
An enlargeable map of the United States after the creation of the Territory of Nevada on March 2 1861.

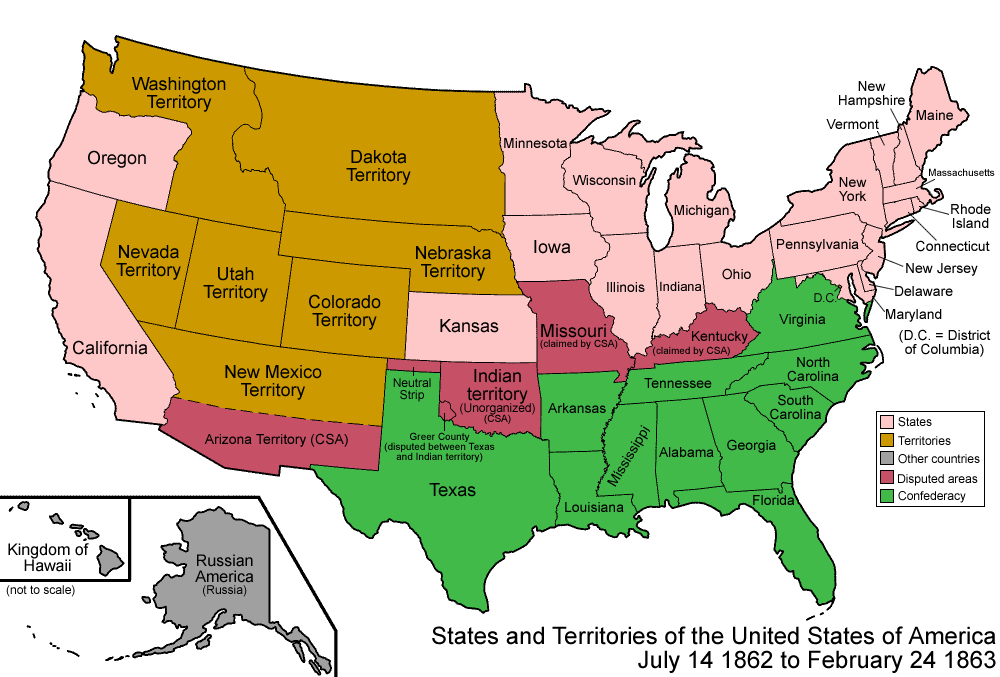
An enlargeable map of the United States after the annexation of a western portion of the Territory of Utah on July 14 1862.

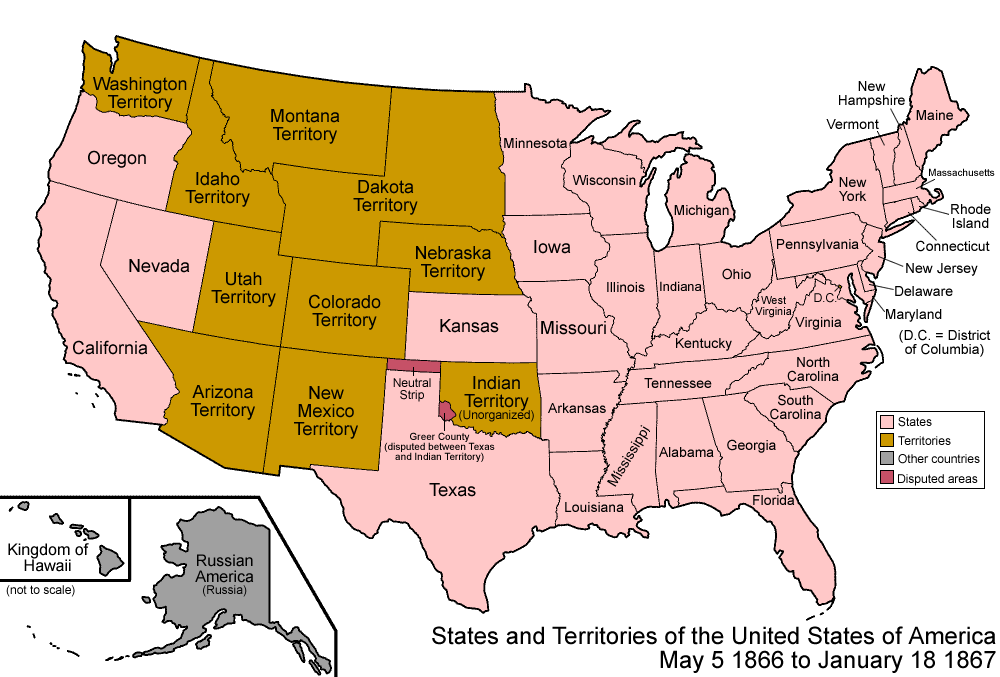
An enlargeable map of the United States after the annexation of another western portion of the Territory of Utah on May 5 1866.

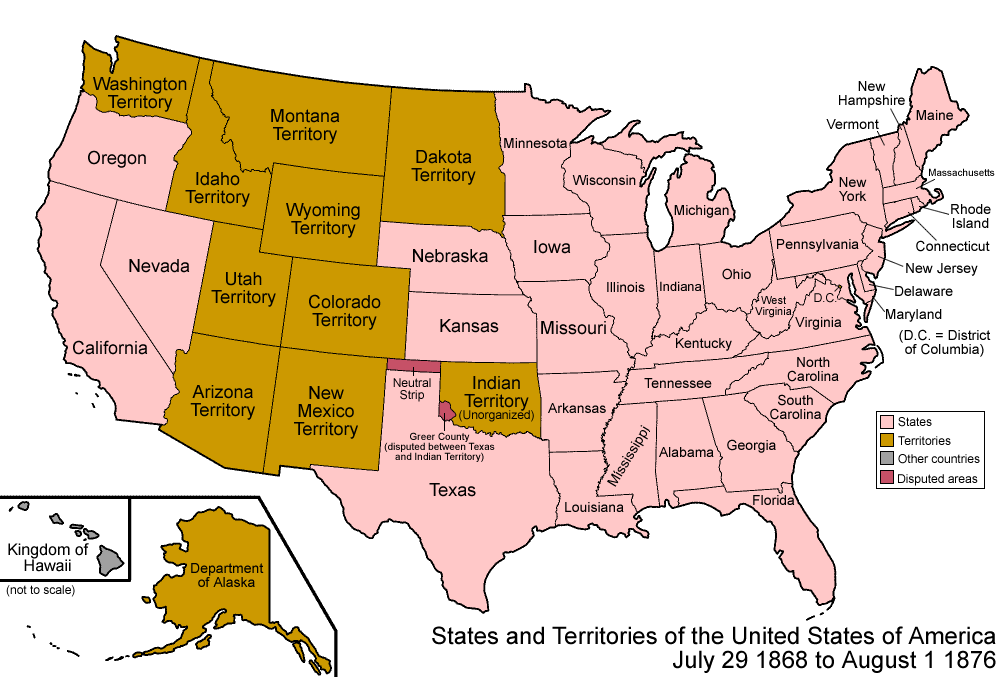
An enlargeable map of the United States after the creation of the Territory of Wyoming on July 25, 1868.

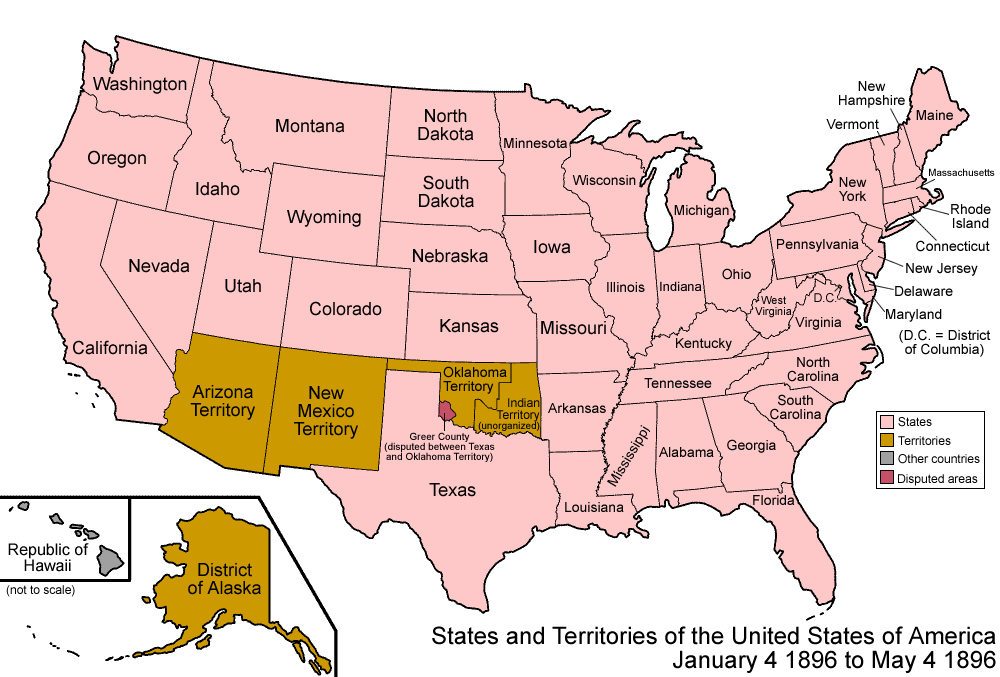
An enlargeable map of the United States after the admission of Utah to the Union on May 4 1896.

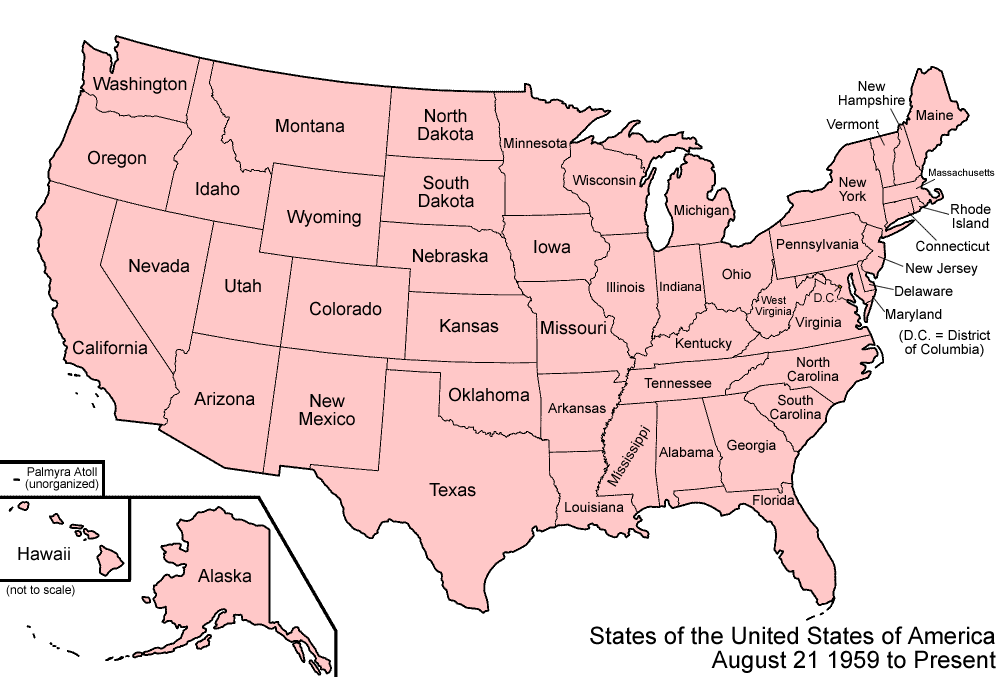
An enlargeable map of the United States as it has been since Hawaiʻi was admitted to the Union on August 21, 1959.

The following timeline traces the territorial evolution of the U.S. State of Utah.

== Timeline ==
- Historical territorial claims of Spain in the present State of Utah:
  - Nueva Vizcaya, 1562–1821
  - Santa Fé de Nuevo Méjico, 1598–1821
  - Gran Cuenca, 1776–1821
    - Adams-Onís Treaty of 1819
    - Treaty of Córdoba of 1821
- Historical territorial claims of Mexico in the present State of Utah:
  - Santa Fé de Nuevo México, 1821–1848
  - Gran Cuenca, 1821–1848
    - Treaty of Guadalupe Hidalgo of 1848
- Historical political divisions of the United States in the present State of Utah:
  - Unorganized territory created by the Treaty of Guadalupe Hidalgo, 1848–1850
    - Compromise of 1850
  - State of Deseret (extralegal), 1849–1850
  - Territory of Utah, 1850–1896
    - Utah Organic Act, September 9, 1850
    - Eastern portion of the Utah Territory is incorporated into the new Territory of Colorado, February 28, 1861
    - Western portion of the Utah Territory is incorporated into the new Territory of Nevada, March 2, 1861
    - North-eastern portion of the Utah Territory is transferred to the Territory of Nebraska, March 2, 1861
    - Western 53 miles of the Utah Territory is transferred to the Territory of Nevada, July 14, 1862
    - Another 53 miles of the Utah Territory is transferred to the State of Nevada, May 5, 1866
    - North-eastern corner of the Utah Territory is incorporated into the new Territory of Wyoming, July 25, 1868
    - Utah Enabling Act, July 16, 1894
  - Territory of Jefferson (extralegal), 1859–1861
  - State of Utah since January 4, 1896

== See also ==
- History of Utah
- Territorial evolution of the United States
- Utah Transfer of Public Lands Act

Territorial evolution of Arizona
List of territorial claims and designations in Colorado
Territorial evolution of Idaho
Territorial evolution of Nevada
Territorial evolution of New Mexico
Territorial evolution of Wyoming
