= Utah Transfer of Public Lands Act =

Piece of state legislation

The State of Utah passed legislation in 2012—the Utah Transfer of Public Lands Act—to require the Federal government to grant the majority of federal land in the state to the state of Utah after 2014. According to Donald J. Kochan, the federal government promised to transfer these lands to the State in the Utah Enabling Act of 1894.

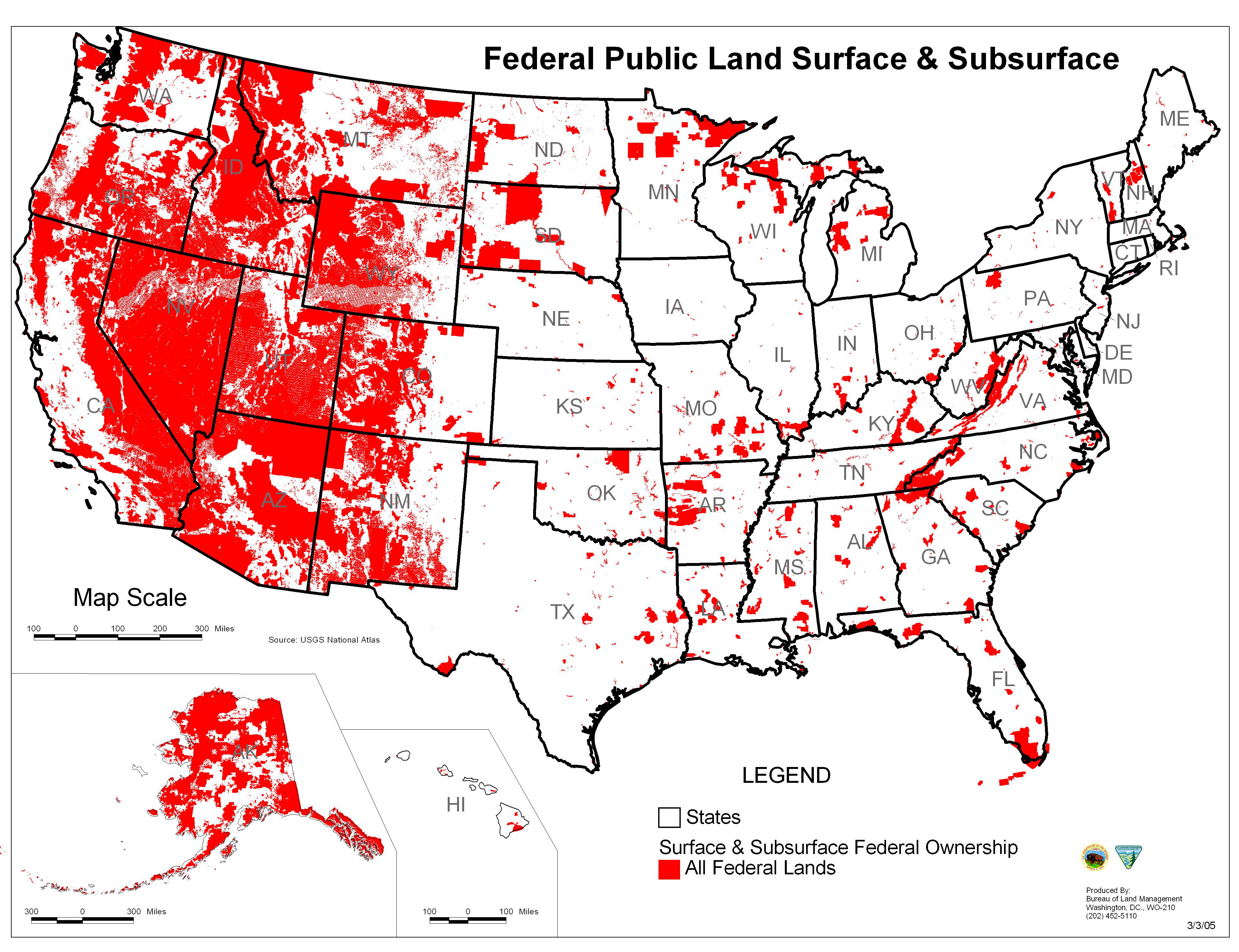
Ownership of Federal lands in the 50 states

Devallier Law Group believes the Federal government is likely to "vigorously oppose" any lawsuit that Utah might bring, and would be expected to "use every legal means to stop it."

On August 20, 2024, the state of Utah filed a lawsuit asking the U.S. Supreme Court to answer a question: "Can the federal government control public lands within the state indefinitely?"

== History ==
Various Utah Federal elected officials have argued for "state rights concerning public lands" for at least several decades prior to 2012. More recently, State Representative Ken Ivory had been a strong supporter of states' rights and had frequently advocated for Utah to take control of federal lands. In 2012, Ivory sponsored HB 148, The Utah Transfer of Public Lands Act, which asserted that the federal government must grant federal land to the state of Utah after 2014. The legislature passed the bill. Governor Gary Herbert signed it into law on 23 March 2012, stating "This is only the first step in a long process, but it is a step we must take."

Though the bill was signed into law in 2012, federal lands remained in control of the Department of the Interior through December 2014, while the state attempted to "educate and negotiate" with Federal officials. As of November 2014, the Federal government had not agreed to enter negotiations.

As of December 2014, the State of Utah began actions to obtain control of 31.2 million acres of federal land that lies within the state. The total land involved is more than half of the total of 54,300,000 acres (220,000 km^{2}) of land in the state. As of 2014 the state promised it would not use force to end federal control these lands, but instead would seek the transfer through a "four-step plan that the governor laid out": a program of education, negotiation, legislation, and litigation. The state set aside US$2 million in 2014 to fund the initial phases of the plan.

In December 2015, the Utah Commission for the Stewardship of Public Lands began the process of preparing a legal complaint that would form the basis for a lawsuit. Also in December 2015, University of Utah law professor Bob Keiter, with John Ruple, published a paper that argued the state would be unlikely to prevail in gaining the mineral rights to the disputed land, and that therefore the State would not be able to afford to manage the lands without additional sources of tax revenue.

In late 2019, the Federal government proposed transferring a small amount of Federal land—9,900 acres (4,000 ha)-to the adjacent US State of Colorado that the Federal government had promised to Colorado, but never transferred, at the time of Colorado's statehood.

== Analysis ==
=== In favor ===
According to the Washington Times, "The federal government controls more than 50 percent of the land west of Kansas—in Utah's case, it's 64.5 percent, a situation that has increasingly resulted in tensions across the Rocky Mountain West." Writing for the Federalist Society, Donald Kochan argues that the original Federal documents that created the State of Utah included promises that "the federal ownership would be of limited duration and that the bulk of those lands would be timely disposed of by the federal government into private ownership or otherwise returned to the State."

The State of Utah relies on the Property Clause and various Federal government court decisions—some from about the time of Utah statehood—implying that the federal Utah Enabling Act stating "...the federal ownership would be of limited duration and that the bulk of those lands would be timely disposed of by the federal government into private ownership or otherwise returned to the State," must be interpreted as meaning at the very least the bulk of federal lands should have been transferred by today's date. In March 2012, a Utah state law was passed the legislature and signed into law by the governor demanding that the "Federal government extinguish its title to an estimated more than 20 million (or by some reports even more than 30 million) acres of federal public lands in the State of Utah by December 31, 2014." It also "call[ed] for the transfer of such acreage to the State and establishe[d] procedures for the development of a management regime for this increased state portfolio of land holdings resulting from the transfer." The legal case of the State of Utah for demanding the lands back, though unprecedented in scale, has legal arguments based on precedent cases both pro and con, and no certainty as to the case outcome will be known before a variety of legal actions are litigated through the courts. "At the very least, there are open legal questions involved in the [Transfer of Public Lands Act] (TPLA)] that have never received definitive resolution in the courts. As such, critics cannot make a cut and dried case against the law. ... there are indeed serious legal questions to consider with the TPLA ." The state's legal case may hinge on somewhat arcane aspects of the Supremacy Clause and Property Clause of the US Constitution and how they interrelate with the Utah Enabling Act of July 16, 1894, although other legal "theories may also support the TPLA demand."

=== Opposed ===
A 2014 study by professor Robert Keiter and research associate John Ruple of the University of Utah College of Law concluded that the state's effort is unlikely to succeed in court. The federal government's right to retain ownership of lands is characterized as "well established." "The federal government has absolute control over federal public lands, including the constitutional authority to retain lands in federal ownership," the study says. "Statutes authorizing Western states to join the Union required those same states to disclaim the right to additional lands, and that disclaimer cannot be spun into a federal duty to dispose." The White Paper on the Transfer of Public Lands Movement was put together by the Wallace Stegner Center for Land, Resources and the Environment.

== Economic analysis ==
The Federal government spent approximately US$247 million managing land in Utah during 2012, about $8 per acre, and employed 2100 people (not including the National Park Service, which is not involved as Park Service lands are to remain with the Federal government, per the original legislation.) Some analysts expect management of the lands by state officials to be revenue positive—even before any land would be sold off and thus begin generating tax revenue to the state—as income from recreation, oil and gas development, and other uses are expected to yield approximately US$331 million per year to state government coffers under state management, assuming the price of oil doesn't go down. Other analysts say that if costs of management, including forest fires, were borne solely by the state, it could result in increased development, increased access fees, and decreased public oversight.
