= Lønborg =

Lønborg is a Danish surname.

Notable people with the surname Lønborg include:

- Harald Lønborg-Jensen (1871–1941), Danish architect
- Margrethe Lønborg Marstrand (1874–1948), Danish teacher and writer
- Stine Nørklit Lønborg (born 1998), Danish handball player

== See also ==
- Lonborg
- Lönnberg
