= Steven Mascaro =

American politician (born 1946)

Member of the Utah House of Representatives from the 47th district
- In office 2002–2010

Personal details
- Born: January 15, 1946 (age 80)
- Party: Republican
- Education: California State University, Fullerton

Steven R. Mascaro (born January 15, 1946) was a member of the Utah House of Representatives from 2002 to 2010, representing District 47 from West Jordan, Utah.

== Biography ==
Mascaro is a member of the Church of Jesus Christ of Latter-day Saints (LDS Church). He graduated from California State University, Fullerton in 1971 with a bachelor's degree in marketing management.

Mascaro is the president and a business partner of Infill Group Incorporated. In the local community, he has also been involved with directing in various organizations, including the Utah Association of Realtors and the Sandy Chamber of Commerce.

=== Politics ===
When State Representative Bryan D. Holladay was elected Mayor of West Jordan in 2001, he recommended Mascaro as his replacement. Receiving the nomination from Republican Party of Utah, Mascaro ran unopposed and took office representing district 47 of the Utah House of Representatives on January 8, 2002. Facing contenders in future campaigns, he was reelected in 2004, 2006, and 2008. In 2010 he ran against Republican Ken Ivory for the Republican Party nomination, and was defeated at the county convention 77%–23%. Following his failed attempt at re-nomination he endorsed Democratic candidate John Rendell for his former seat.

In 2008 Mascaro was one of five state representatives filing a bipartisan ethics complaint against a fellow Republican for allegedly bribing his opponent during a primary election. Shortly later, an unrelated report by a female intern about Mascaro was leaked, with the suggestion of improper conduct. Speaking to the media Mascaro dismissed the report, arguing the story was retaliation by House party leadership, who had already labeled Mascaro a "dissident Republican."

== Electoral results ==
2002 District 47 Utah House of Representatives election
| Party | Candidate | Votes | % |
|---|---|---|---|
| Republican | Steven R. Mascaro | 4,616 | 99.74 |
| Republican hold | | | |

2004 District 47 Utah House of Representatives election
| Party | Candidate | Votes | % |
|---|---|---|---|
| Democratic | Val Lund | 4,068 | 39.55 |
| Republican | Steven R. Mascaro (inc.) | 6,219 | 60.45 |
| Republican hold | | | |

2006 District 47 Utah House of Representatives election
| Party | Candidate | Votes | % |
|---|---|---|---|
| Democratic | Steven T. Bickmore | 2,818 | 46.49 |
| Republican | Steven R. Mascaro (inc.) | 3,240 | 53.45 |
| Republican hold | | | |

2008 District 47 Utah House of Representatives election
| Party | Candidate | Votes | % |
|---|---|---|---|
| Democratic | Jennifer Burley Wolfe | 4,572 | 43.87 |
| Republican | Steven R. Mascaro (inc.) | 5,510 | 52.87 |
| Constitution | Joye S. Wyatt | 333 | 3.2 |
| Republican hold | | | |
