= Lönnberg =

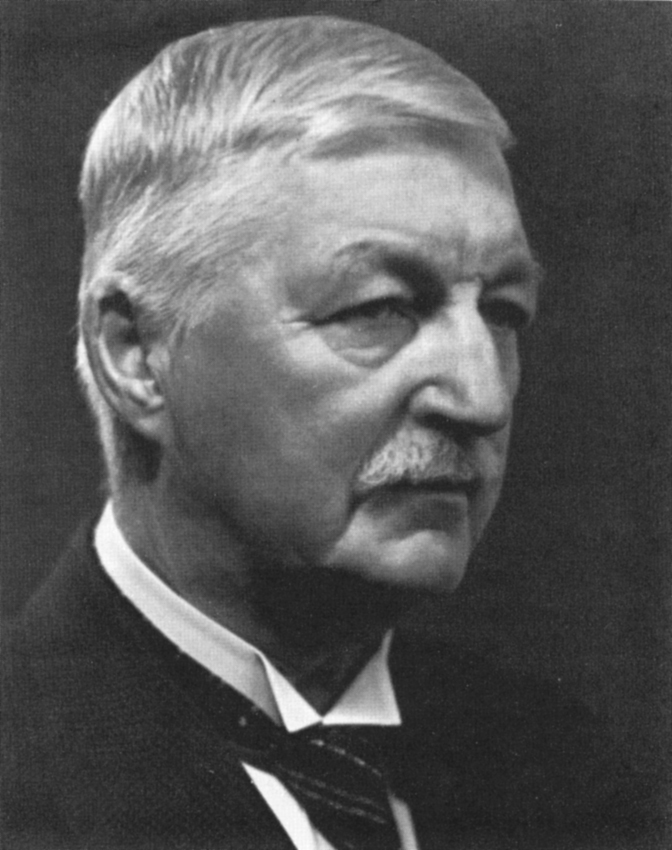
Einar Lönnberg

Lönnberg is a Swedish surname. It might also be spelled Lonnberg or Loennberg in countries where languages that do not include the letter ö are spoken. As of October 2013, there are 916 people with this surname in Sweden and 9 in the United States.

== Variants ==
- Lonnberg
- Loennberg

== Notable people ==
Notable people with this surname include:

- Anne Lonnberg (born 1948), American actress and singer of Swedish descent
- Daniel Lönnberg, Swedish swimmer
- Einar Lönnberg (1865–1942), Swedish zoologist and conservationist
- Ivan Lönnberg (1891–1918), Swedish painter and long-distance runner

== See also ==
- Lonborg
- Lønborg
