= Henrik Christiansen =

Henrik Christiansen may refer to:

- Henrik Christiansen (speed skater) (born 1983), Norwegian long track speed skater
- Henrik Christiansen (canoeist), Danish sprint canoer
- Henrik Christiansen (swimmer) (born 1996), Norwegian swimmer
