= Jake Christiansen =

Jake Christiansen may refer to:

- Jake Christiansen (coach) (1900–1992), American football and basketball player and coach
- Jake Christiansen (ice hockey) (born 1999), Canadian professional ice hockey defenceman
- Jake Christiansen Stadium, a sports venue on the campus of Concordia College in Moorhead, Minnesota
