= Rasmus Christiansen =

Rasmus Christiansen may refer to:

- Rasmus Christiansen (actor) (1885–1964), Danish actor
- Rasmus Christiansen (footballer, born 1988), Danish soccer player for Blokhus FC
- Rasmus Christiansen (footballer, born 1989), Danish soccer player
- Rasmus Christiansen (painter) (1863–1940), Danish artist who lived in Reventlowsgade

== See also ==
- Rasmus Christensen, Danish footballer b. 1991
