= Justice Christianson =

Justice Christianson may refer to:

- Adolph M. Christianson (1877–1954), associate justice of the North Dakota Supreme Court
- Theodore Christianson (judge) (1913–1955), associate justice of the Minnesota Supreme Court
- William C. Christianson (1892–1985), associate justice of the Minnesota Supreme Court

== See also ==
- Ditlef Hvistendahl Christiansen (1865–1944), justice of the Norwegian Supreme Court
- Susan Christensen (born 1962), associate justice of the Iowa Supreme Court
- Judge Christensen (disambiguation)
