= Jesper Christiansen =

Jesper Christiansen may refer to:

- Jesper Christiansen (footballer, born 1978), Danish footballer
- Jesper Christiansen (footballer, born 1980), Danish footballer
- Jesper deClaville Christiansen (born 1963), Danish professor

== See also ==
- Jesper Christensen (born 1948), Danish actor
- Jesper Bøje Christensen (born 1944), Danish harpsichordist and music researcher
- Jesper Christjansen (born 1987), Danish footballer
