= Vidar Christiansen =

Norwegian economist (born 1948)

Vidar Christiansen (born 12 June 1948) is a Norwegian economist.

He was born in Drammen and grew up in Hokksund. After graduating with the cand.oecon. degree he was a research fellow at the University of Oslo from 1975, lecturer at the Norwegian School of Economics from 1979 and at the University of Oslo from 1981. He took his dr. oecon. degree at the Norwegian School of Economics in 1987. In 1989 he was awarded the David Davidsson Prize for best article in the Scandinavian Journal of Economics. In 1991 he was hired as professor at the BI Norwegian Business School and from 1994 to his retirement he was a professor at the University of Oslo.

He is a member of the Norwegian Academy of Science and Letters and the Royal Norwegian Society of Sciences and Letters. He is also a fellow of the European Economic Association.
