= Christiansen effect =

The Christiansen effect is named after the Danish physicist Christian Christiansen and describes the reduced scattering of multi-phase microstructures at wavelengths where their refractive indices match.

A Christiansen filter is a narrow bandpass or monochromatic optical filter which consists of an optical cell which is stuffed with a crushed substance (e.g. glass) and a (mostly organic) liquid. The liquid is chosen according to the substance, so that the dispersion curves coincide at one wavelength. For this wavelength the filled optical cell behaves like a plane-parallel, homogeneous disk and allows transmission. All other wavelength ranges of the spectrum are reflected, scattered as well as refracted at the many interfaces between substance and liquid. A change of the transmission behavior of this dispersion filter can be achieved by variation of the liquid, the temperature or variation of the pressure. The fundamental consequence is the change of the refractive index of the liquid.

A typical filter is composed of glass particles immersed in a mixture of benzene and carbon disulfide. The wavelength of operation can be varied by changing the percentage of the two components of the liquid mixture, or by varying the temperature.

== Bibliography ==
- Christian Christiansen, „Untersuchungen über die optischen Eigenschaften von fein verteilten Körpern - Erste Mittheilung“ [“Studies on the optical properties of finely divided bodies - First part”], Annalen der Physik und Chemie (Leipzig), vol. 23, pp. 298-306, 1884
- Christian Christiansen, „Untersuchungen über die optischen Eigenschaften von fein verteilten Körpern - Zweite Mittheilung“ [“Studies on the optical properties of finely divided bodies - Second part”], Annalen der Physik und Chemie (Leipzig), vol. 24, pp. 439-446, 1885
- Sir Chandrasekhara Venkata Raman, “The theory of the Christiansen experiment”, Proceedings of the Indian Academy of Sciences, Section A, vol. 29, pp. 381-390, 1949
- V. I. Shelyubskii (В. И. Шелюбский), Новый нетод определения и контроля, однородности стекла [“A new method for determining and controlling the homogeneity of glass”], Стекло и керамика [Glass and Ceramics], vol. 8, pp. 17-22, 1960
- Teruo Sakaino, Masayuki Yamane, Akio Makishima, and Satoru Inoue, “An improved method for measuring the homogeneity of glass by Shelyubskii's method”, Glass Technology, vol. 19, pp. 69-74, 1978
- Roland Paul Heidrich, Experimentelle Homogenitätsuntersuchungen an technischen Gläsern mit dem Cristiansenfilter [Experimental homogeneity studies on technical glasses using the Christiansen filter], Thesis, Technische Universität Clausthal, 1999
- Roland Paul Heidrich, Günther Heinz Frischat, “Optimizing the Christiansen-Shelyubskii method and its comparison with industrial control methods for homogeneity determination of glasses”, Glastechnische Berichte [Glass Science and Technology], vol. 72, no. 6, pp. 197-203, 1999
