= Claus Christiansen =

Claus Christiansen may refer to:

- Claus Christiansen (footballer, born 1967), Danish football defender
- Claus Christiansen (footballer, born 1972), Danish footballer and manager
