= Kenneth Christiansen =

Kenneth Christiansen may refer to:

- Kenneth Christiansen (D. B. Cooper suspect)
- Kenneth A. Christiansen, American speleobiologist and Collembola systematist
- Kenneth Heiner Christiansen, Danish footballer
