= Steve Christiansen =

American politician and businessman (born 1961)

Member of the Utah House of Representatives from the 47th district
- In office September 16, 2019 – October 28, 2021
- Preceded by: Ken Ivory
- Succeeded by: Ken Ivory

Personal details
- Born: September 24, 1961 (age 64) Brigham City, Utah, U.S.
- Party: Republican
- Children: 4
- Education: University of Utah (BA); Northwestern University (MBA)

Steve R. Christiansen (born September 24, 1961) is an American politician and businessman who served as a member of the Utah House of Representatives from the 47th district from 2019 to 2021.

== Early life and education ==
Christiansen was born in Brigham City, Utah in 1961. He earned a Bachelor of Arts degree in accounting from the University of Utah and a Master of Business Administration from the Kellogg School of Management at Northwestern University.

== Career ==
From 1989 to 2002, Christiansen worked as a managing director, brand manager, and marketing director for Kimberly-Clark. He was then the executive vice president of School Specialty, a school supplies company based in Greenville, Wisconsin. Christiansen was also a minority investor in a home healthcare company. From 2007 to 2010, he was the president of Wash Pro Enterprises, an industrial cleaning company. From 2010 to 2012, he was the CEO of RiverRock Bioscience. From 2012 to 2016, Christiansen was the global director of distribution for the Church of Jesus Christ of Latter-day Saints. He was elected to the Utah House of Representatives in a special election to succeed Ken Ivory. In the House, he was a member of the Political Subdivisions Committee and Transportation Committee.

In 2021, Christiansen cast doubt on the integrity of Utah's 2020 election, despite no evidence of election fraud. He became one of the leaders of an effort to audit the 2020 presidential election result in Utah and claimed that vote-by-mail increases election fraud. He resigned from the legislature on October 28, 2021.
