= Tanya Christiansen =

American mathematician

Tanya Julie Christiansen is an American mathematician who works in scattering theory and the theory of partial differential equations. She is Luther Marion Defoe Distinguished Professor of Mathematics at the University of Missouri.

== Education and career ==
Christiansen graduated summa cum laude in 1989 from Rice University, with a bachelor's degree in mathematics. She completed her Ph.D. in 1993 at the Massachusetts Institute of Technology. Her dissertation, Scattering Theory on Compact Manifolds with Boundary, was supervised by Richard Burt Melrose.

After postdoctoral positions at the University of Pennsylvania and Johns Hopkins University, she joined the University of Missouri faculty in 1995. She became Defoe Distinguished Professor in 2019.
