= Pål H. Christiansen =

Norwegian writer

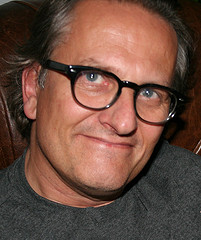
Pål Herman Christiansen

Pål Herman Christiansen (born 9 September 1958, Oslo) is a Norwegian novelist and children's book author.

== Biography ==
Christiansen was born in Oslo in 1958. From 1973 to 1977 he attended Oslo Commerce School. In 1978 he studied law at the University of Oslo where he later dropped out. In 1985 Christiansen took a short writing course at the Telemark University College.

In 1989 he debuted his first novel "Harry var ikke ved sine fulle fem" (Harry was not in his right mind). He has since released a total of five novels and eleven children's books. His novel "Drømmer om storhet" from 2002 got attention from fans of pop group a-ha worldwide and the English version "The Scoundrel Days of Hobo Highbrow" was published in 2008. In 1996 Christiansen became a member of the Norwegian Authors' Union.

Christiansen was the recipient of the 2001 Tiden-prisen Prize for his distinct voice in the literary landscape.

Christiansen owns a little publishing company named Fabula, through which he has published books such as "Little Blue and Little Yellow" by Leo Lionni, and "The Red Balloon" by Albert Lamorisse in Norwegian.

== Bibliography ==
- 2002 – The Scoundrel Days of Hobo Highbrow (Drømmer om storhet) – translated into English by Jon Buscall in 2008

== Awards and prizes ==
- 2001: Tiden-prisen Prize
