= Kristinsson =

Kristinsson is a surname. Notable people with the surname include:

- Birkir Kristinsson (born 1964), Icelandic football goalkeeper
- Brynjar Kristinsson (born 1988), Icelandic cross-country skier
- Guðmundur Ingi Kristinsson (born 1955), Icelandic politician
- Jón Kristinsson (born 1942), Icelandic chess player
- Rúnar Kristinsson (born 1969), Icelandic footballer
