= Kristiansen =

Kristiansen (Danish pronunciation: [kʰʁeˈstjænˀsn̩, kʰʁæˈ-]) is a Danish and Norwegian patronymic surname that may refer to the following notable people:

- Bjarne Kristiansen (born 1937), Norwegian politician
- Cecilie Kristiansen (born 1990), Danish Paralympic swimmer
- Celine Lundbye Kristiansen, Danish handball player
- Egil Kristiansen, Norwegian cross country skier
- Einar Kristiansen, Norwegian Nordic skiing athlete
- Einstein Kristiansen, Norwegian cartoonist, designer, TV-host
- Elin Kristiansen, Norwegian biathlete
- Erling Kristiansen (chess player), Norwegian chess master
- Gro Marit Istad Kristiansen, Norwegian biathlete
- Henry Wilhelm Kristiansen, Norwegian newspaper editor and Communist Party politician (1902–1942)
- Ingrid Kristiansen, Norwegian long-distance runner
- Jan Arne Kristiansen, rock musician with the band Raga Rockers
- Jan Kristiansen, Danish footballer
- Jeanett Kristiansen, Norwegian handball player
- Jens Kristiansen (born 1952), Danish chess grandmaster
- John 'Tune' Kristiansen Danish soccer manager
- Kåre Kristiansen, Norwegian politician
- Kjartan Kristiansen, Norwegian rock musician
- Kjeld Kirk Kristiansen, Danish businessman, former CEO of LEGO (1979–2004)
- Lyle Kristiansen (1939–2015), Canadian politician from British Columbia
- Magne Kristiansen, American engineer
- Sven Erik Kristiansen, Norwegian musician known as "Maniac", a black metal musician
- Teddy Kristiansen, Danish comic book artist.
