= Dick Christiansen =

American gridiron football player (born 1931)

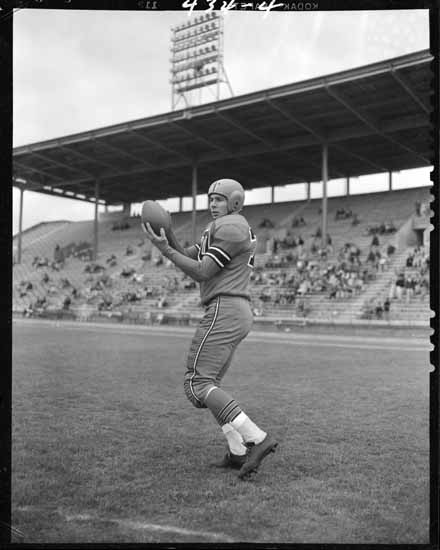
- Christiansen in 1954

Profile
- Position: End

Personal information
- Born: July 25, 1931 (age 95); Los Angeles, California, U.S.
- Listed height: 6 ft 4 in (1.93 m)
- Listed weight: 233 lb (106 kg)

Career history
- 1954: BC Lions

Richard Morris Christiansen (born July 25, 1931) is an American former professional football player who played for the BC Lions. He played college football at the University of Arizona. His two sons, Brian and Gregg also played college football; Brian at Arizona and Gregg at UCLA.
